= Zhenitba =

Unfinished opera by Modest Mussorgsky

- Opera by Modest Mussorgsky
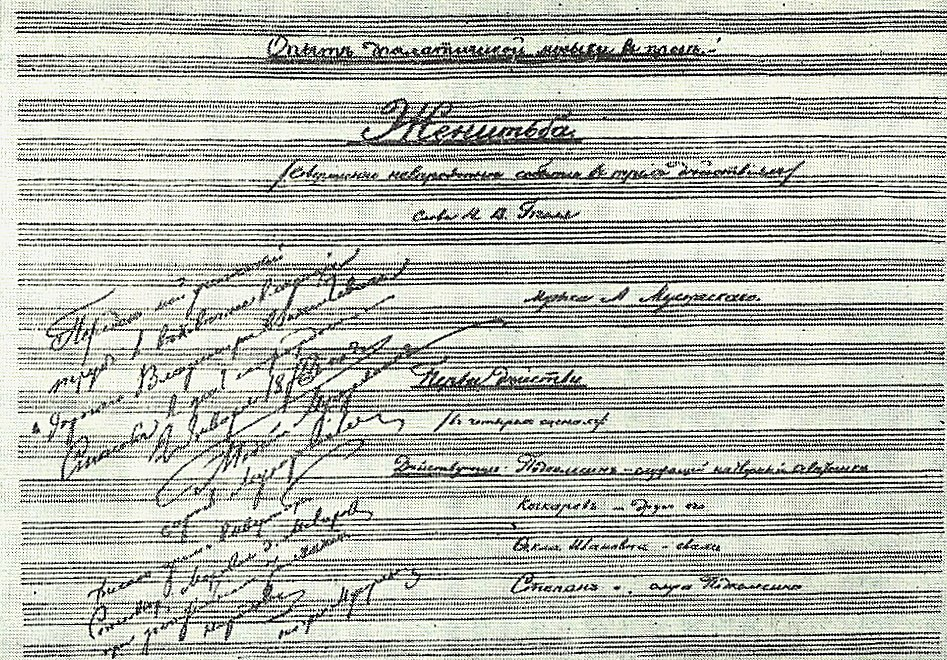
- Mussorgsky's manuscript, titled: An experiment in dramatic music in prose Marriage; A completely improbable event in three acts
- Native title: Russian: Женитьба
- Librettist: Mussorgsky
- Language: Russian
- Based on: Marriage by Gogol
- Premiere: 12 December 1908; Great Hall of the Nobility, Moscow

Zhenitba (Russian: Женитьба, Zhenit'ba, Marriage) is an unfinished opera begun in 1868 by Modest Mussorgsky to his own libretto based on Nikolai Gogol's comedy Marriage. This 1842 play is a satire of courtship and cowardice, which centres on a young woman, Agafya, who is wooed by four bachelors, each with his own idiosyncrasies.

== History ==
=== Composition history ===
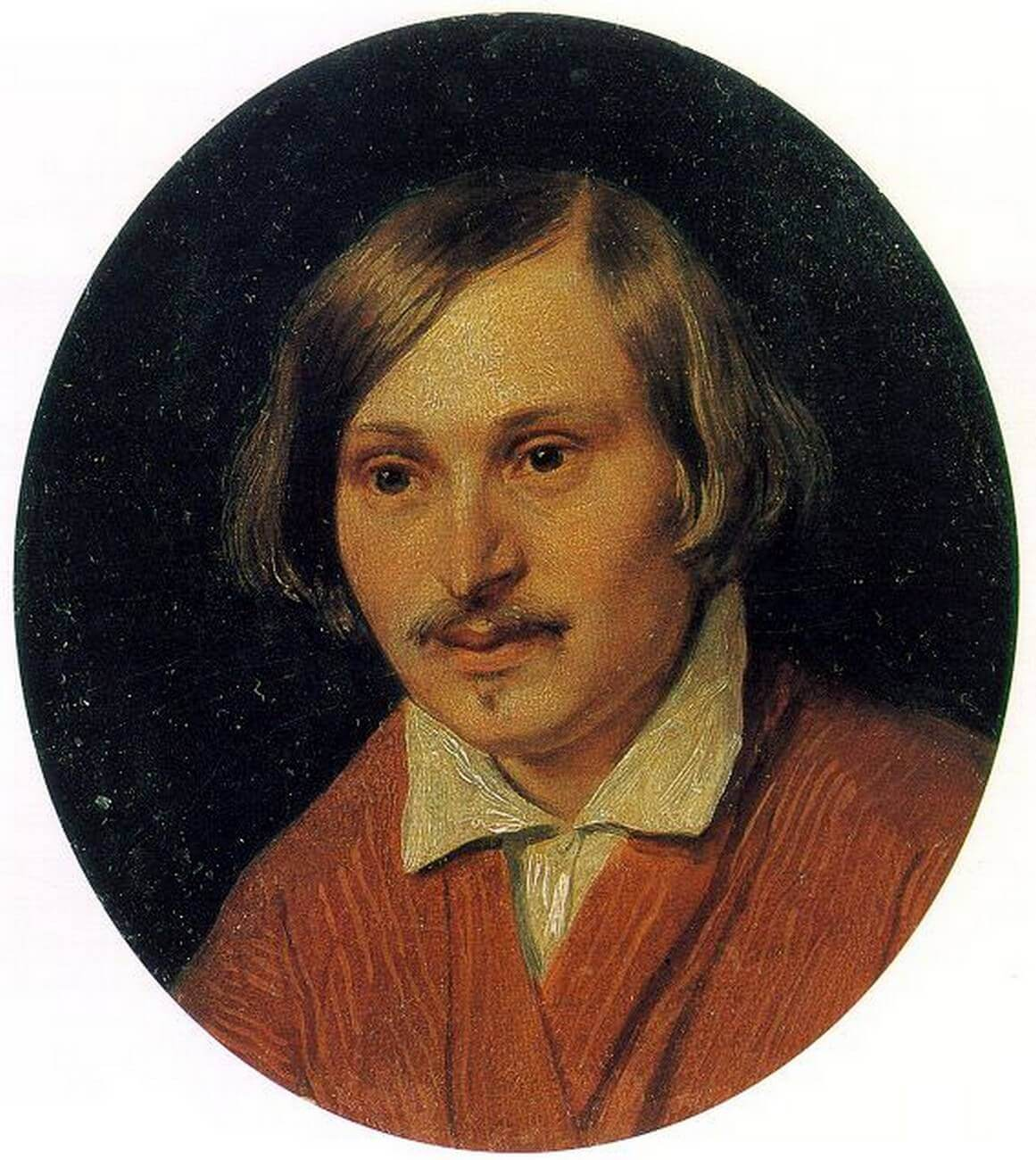
Nikolay Gogol (1809–1852)

The idea to set Gogol's Marriage to music came from the advice and influence of Alexander Dargomyzhsky, who began to compose his own experimental opera, The Stone Guest, to Alexander Pushkin's tragedy just two years earlier (in 1866). Dargomyzhsky declared that the text would be set "just as it stands, so that the inner truth of the text should not be distorted", and in a manner that abolished the 'unrealistic' division between aria and recitative in favour of a continuous mode of syllabic but lyrically heightened declamation somewhere between the two.

In 1868, Mussorgsky rapidly set the first eleven scenes of Zhenitba, with his priority being to render into music the natural accents and patterns of the play's naturalistic and deliberately humdrum dialogue. Mussorgsky's aim was to create individual musical signatures for each character using the natural rhythms of the text. The composer noted:

I would very much like my characters on the stage to speak like living people, and in such a manner that the character and force of the intonation, supported by the orchestra and forming the background for their speech, would gain its object, that is, my music must be the artistic reproduction of human speech in all its subtle nuances.

The first act was completed in 1868 in a vocal score and the composer noted, that summer:

I have completed the first act. It rained without stopping for three days running and I worked without stopping in keeping with the weather. The Marriage gave me not a minute of calm – so I wrote it.

The score is inscribed with the following details: "The work began on Tuesday, June 11, 1868 in Petrograd (St. Petersburg), and was finished on Tuesday, July 8, 1868 in the village Shilovo, Tula Oblast."

The Marriage was one of Mussorgsky's first musical masterpieces. According to one critic, it was an experiment in Russian opera that used "satirical, grotesque musical language, with all its jolting contrasts and exaggerations, when the composer, in the best Russian-Petersburg tradition, mocks his characters but at the same time 'weeps' over them."

=== Performance history ===
1868, Saint Petersburg – Private performance

An early performance with Mussorgsky's participation took place in 1868 in the home of César Cui. Nadezhda Purgold accompanied on the piano. The cast included Modest Mussorgsky (Podkolyosin), Alexander Dargomyzhsky (Kochkaryov), Aleksandra Purgold (Fyokla Ivanovna), and Konstantin Velyaminov (Stepan). Aleksandra Purgold (later Molas) was the sister of Nadezhda Purgold (later Rimskaya-Korsakova).

1906, Saint Petersburg – Private performance

A later private performance took place in the home of Nikolai Rimsky-Korsakov. Nadezhda Purgold was now Nadezhda Rimskaya-Korsakova, through marriage to the composer; she again accompanied on the piano. The cast included Sigizmund Blumenfeld (Podkolyosin), A. P. Sandulenko (Kochkaryov), Sonya Rimskaya-Korsakova (Fyokla Ivanovna), and Gury Stravinsky (Stepan). Sigizmund Blumenfeld was the brother of conductor Felix Blumenfeld, Sonya Rimskaya-Korsakova was the daughter of Nikolai and Nadezhda Rimsky-Korsakov, and Gury Stravinsky was the brother of composer Igor Stravinsky.

1908, Moscow – World premiere

The first professional public performance took place on 12 December 1908 in the Great Hall of the Nobility in Moscow. The Rimsky-Korsakov edition (1908) was performed. Production personnel included Arkady Kerzin (producer). D. Veyss (Weiss) accompanied on the piano. The cast included Vladimir Lossky (Podkolyosin), Fyodor Ernst (Kochkaryov), Serafima Selyuk-Roznatovskaya (Fyokla Ivanovna), and Khristofor Tolkachev (Stepan).

In April 1973, at Cornell University's Barnes Hall, a Readers' Theater performance in Leonard Lehrman's English translation was presented in class with George Gibian as Podkolyossin, William Austin as Kotchkaryov, Laurel Fay as Fyokla Ivanovna and Jerry Amaldev as Stepan, with Leonard Lehrman at the piano. Alexander Tcherepnine subsequently asked Lehrman to translate into his English his completion of the opera. The work is still in progress.

=== Publication history ===
- 1908, vocal score edition by Nikolai Rimsky-Korsakov, V. Bessel and Co., St. Petersburg
- 1933, vocal score, original composer's version in the second issue of Volume IV of the Complete Works by M. P. Mussorgsky, Muzgiz together with Universal Edition, Moscow

== Roles ==
Role	Voice type	Premiere Cast (Conductor: – )
Podkolyosin, a court councillor	baritone	
Kochkaryov, his friend	tenor	
Fyokla Ivanovna, a matchmaker	mezzo-soprano	
Stepan, Podkolyosin's valet	bass	

== Synopsis ==
Time:
Place:

Scene 1

The idle bachelor Podkolyosin attempts to find a wife: "Well, when one considers carefully, one sees that marriage can be very useful." He currently leads a chaotic life, with his poor servant, Stepan, constantly at his beck and call.

Scene 2

A marriage broker, Fyokla Ivanovna, arrives to give Podkolyosin details of a girl she has chosen for him. However, he is more interested in her dowry: "And what kind of dowry will I receive? Let's start from the beginning and discuss the dowry ..." He also worries that she is not sufficiently highly bred for him: "I don't suppose she is the daughter of an Officer?... So, is this really the best bargain?" Fyokla suggests that he can't afford be fussy with his poor looks and greying hair!

Scene 3

Unexpectedly Kochkaryov, Podkolyosin's best friend, turns up and is angry to see the marriage broker. He complains that she has married him off to a troublesome, bossy woman. He sends her away, and decides to take over the match-making duties himself.

Scene 4

He paints an idealistic and hassle-free picture of married life for his friend: "There will be a bird in its cage and some embroidery. Just imagine yourself in your chair, quiet and serene and at your side a little caressing woman, all round and pretty. Her hand will stroke you ... like this ..." A reluctant Podkolyosin resists Kochkaryov's demands that he at least visit the girl: "Leave it for now ... come on, we'll go tomorrow." And Kochkaryov answers: "You're an idiot and coward! You are even worse ... you're a sissy and an ass!" And Kochkaryov literally shoves Podkolesin out of the door of his apartment. Here the 1st act ends.

== Versions by other hands ==
Year	Editor	Type	Notes
1908	Nikolai Rimsky-Korsakov	Revision	Publication: 1908, Saint Petersburg, V. Bessel and Co. (vocal score); Premiere: 12 December 1908, Moscow, Great Hall of the Nobility
1917	Aleksandr Gauk	Orchestration	Premiere: 13 October 1917, Petrograd, Theatre of Musical Drama
1930	Marguerite Béclard d'Harcourt	Orchestration	
1931	Mikhail Ippolitov-Ivanov	Completion	Premiere: 1931, Moscow, Radioteatr
1935	Alexander Tcherepnin	Completion	Premiere: 14 September 1937, Essen, as Die Heirat (German translation by Heinrich Burkard); Publication: 1938, Vienna, Universal Edition (vocal score)
1954	Antoine Duhamel	Orchestration	
1982	Gennady Rozhdestvensky	Orchestration	
1991	Vyacheslav Nagovitsin	Orchestration	

== Recordings ==
Year	Cast: (Podkolyosin, Kochkaryov, Fyokla Ivanovna, Stepan)	Conductor and Orchestra	Version	Label
1950?	Daniel Demyanov, Pavel Pontryagin, Anna Matyushina, Georgiy Abramov	Aleksey Kovalev; USSR State Radio Orchestra	Ippolitov-Ivanov	LP: Melodiya, Cat: D 011919–22, Westminster, Cat: OPW 1202
1953	Nicholas Agrov, Jean Mollien, Charlotte Desmazures, Aleksandr Popovitsky	René Leibowitz; Orchestre Radio-Symphonique de Paris	Duhamel	LP: Oceanic, Cat: OCS 36, Olympic, Cat: OL 9105
1982	Vladimir Khrulev, Aleksandr Podbolotor, Lyudmila Kolmakova, Vladimir Ribasenko	Gennady Rozhdestvensky; USSR Ministry of Culture Symphony Orchestra	Rozhdestvensky	LP: Melodiya, Cat: A10 00039 007, CD: Olympia, OCD 145
2009	Yury Vorobev, Andrey Zorin, Anna Kiknadze, Pavel Shmulevich	Mikhail Agrest; Mariinsky Theatre Orchestra	Nagovitsin	VH: YouTube, JGlnuOAbMGQ
