= Osip Petrov =

Russian opera singer (1806–1878)

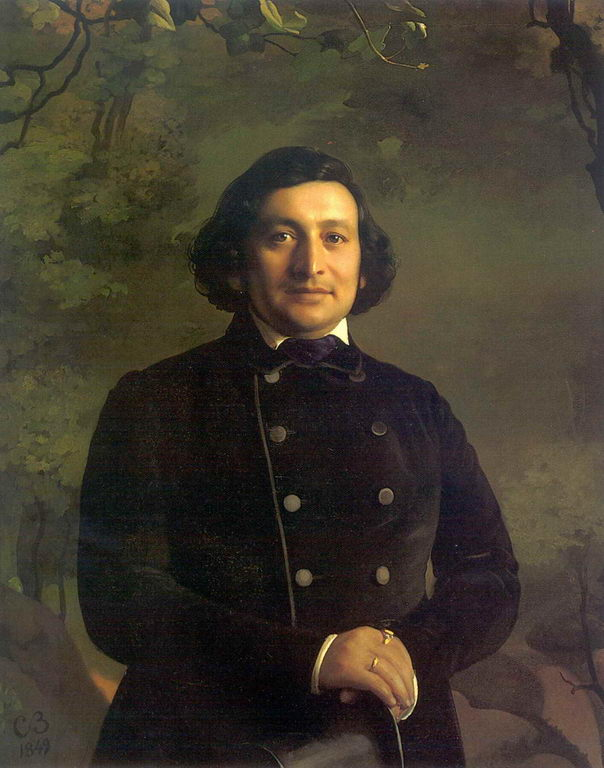
Portrait by Sergey Zaryanko, 1849

Osip Afanasievich Petrov (Russian: Осип Афанасиевич Петров; 15 November [O.S. 3 November] 1806 – 12 March [O.S. 28 February] 1878) was a Russian operatic bass-baritone of great range and renown, whose career centred on St. Petersburg.

== Biography ==
Osip Petrov was born in Yelisavetgrad (present-day Kropyvnytskyi, Ukraine). He started his career by singing in a church chorus. Petrov then worked in Russian provincial theaters (including Poltava, where he worked together with Mikhail Shchepkin).

From 1830 until his death in 1878, he worked for the Mariinsky Theatre in St. Petersburg. His career was one triumph after another, and he created a number of important roles in Russian operas, by composers such as Dargomyzhsky, Glinka, Mussorgsky, Rimsky-Korsakov, Anton Rubinstein, Tchaikovsky, and others.

His 50th anniversary as a singer was the cause for national celebration. On 21 April 1876, on the stage of the Mariinsky Theatre, he was presented with a gold medal, the personal gift of Emperor Alexander II. The president of the Russian Musical Society, the emperor's uncle, Grand Duke Konstantin, presented an address in his honour. Messages from all over Russia were read out. Then he was presented with a wreath made of 100 gold leaves studded with diamonds, one leaf for each of the 100 operas in which he had sung. Tchaikovsky wrote a Cantata (Hymn) on the Occasion of the Celebration of the 50th Jubilee of the Singer Osip Afanasievich Petrov, for tenor, chorus and orchestra, with words by Nikolay Nekrasov. This was performed at the St. Petersburg Conservatory on 6 May 1876, under the conductor Karl Davydov.

Petrov's 52-year career continued until the night before he died.

His wife was a Russian operatic contralto, Anna Vorobyova.

== Performance repertoire ==
He created the following roles:

- Susanin in Catterino Cavos's Ivan Susanin
- Leporello in Dargomyzhsky's The Stone Guest
- Susanin in Glinka's A Life for the Tsar
- Ruslan in Glinka's Ruslan and Lyudmila
- Varlaam in Mussorgsky's Boris Godunov
- Ivan the Terrible in Rimsky-Korsakov's The Maid of Pskov
- Prince Gudal in Anton Rubinstein's The Demon
- Oziya in Serov's Judith
- Prince Vladimir in Serov's Rogneda
- Kochubey in Tchaikovsky's Mazeppa
- Neizvestnyi (The Unknown Man) in Verstovsky's Askold's Grave.

== Sources ==
- "Петров, Осип Афанасьевич" . Brockhaus and Efron Encyclopedic Dictionary (in Russian). 1906.
