= Yuliya Platonova =

Russian opera singer

- Юлия Платонова
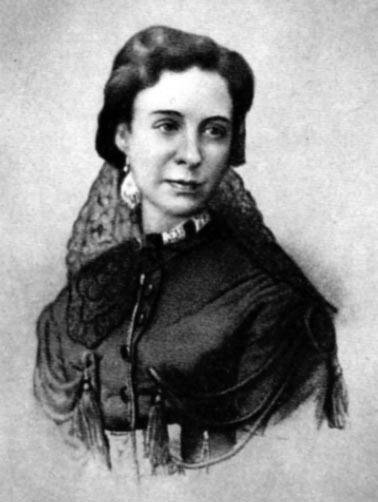
- Born: Yuliya Feodorovna Garder; 1841; Riga, Governorate of Livonia
- Died: November 4, 1892; St. Petersburg, Russian Empire

Yuliya Feodorovna Platonova or Julia Platonova (Note: Yuliya according to BGN/PCGN, Ûliâ — ISO 9, I͡ulii͡a — ALA-LC, Julija — GOST (1983) / UN (1987) transliteration system.) (Russian: Юлия Фёдоровна Платонова, romanized: Yuliya Feodorovna Platonova, née Garder, 1841—1892) was a Russian soprano known for her performances at the Imperial Theatres. She is considered one of the most important figures in the formation of Russian opera. She taught music in Saint Petersburg, with notable students including Maria Olenina-d'Alheim.

== Repertory ==
Among more than 50 of her roles, the most notable were the following:

- Antonida (A Life for the Tsar),
- Elvira (I puritani),
- Natasha (Rusalka),
- Lyudmila (Ruslan and Lyudmila),
- Katerina (The Storm, by Vladimir Kashperov, 1867),
- Adalgisa (Norma),
- Elsa (Lohengrin),
- Maria (William Ratcliff),
- Berthe (Le prophète),
- Halka (Halka),
- Mařenka (The Bartered Bride),
- Dasha (The Power of the Fiend),
- Valentine (Les Huguenots),
- Donna Anna (The Stone Guest),
- Donna Anna (Don Giovanni),
- Olga (The Maid of Pskov),
- Marina Mnishek (Boris Godunov),
- Elisabeth (Tannhäuser).
