= Andrei Chistyakov (conductor) =

Russian conductor (1949–2000)

Andrei Nikolaevich Chistyakov or Andrey Chistiakov (Андрей Николаевич Чистяков) (4 January 1949, in Leningrad – 29 November 2000, in Moscow) was a Russian conductor and National Artist of Russia.

He studied conducting at the Leningrad Conservatory under Ilya Musin. From 1978-1988 he was chief conductor of the Symphony Orchestra of the Sverdlovsk Philharmonic, from 1988 conductor of the Bolshoi Theatre.

== Selected discography ==
- Sergei Prokofiev: Piano Concerto No. 3. Evgeny Kissin, piano; Andrei Chistyakov conducting the Moscow Philharmonic Orchestra. Live performances: 1984-86.
- Sergei Rachmaninov, Aleko.
- Pyotr Ilyich Tchaikovsky, stage music from The Snow Maiden
- Rimsky-Korsakov, May Night 1994
- Alexander Dargomyzhsky, The Stone Guest 1995
- Dmitri Shostakovich fragment The Gambler Act1. 1995
- Alexander Serov Judith Irina Udalova (Judith), Russian Academic Choir of the USSR, Male Chamber Choir & Bolshoi Theatre Orchestra, 1990, reissued Brilliant 2011
