= Konstantin Lyadov =

Russian conductor (1820–1871)

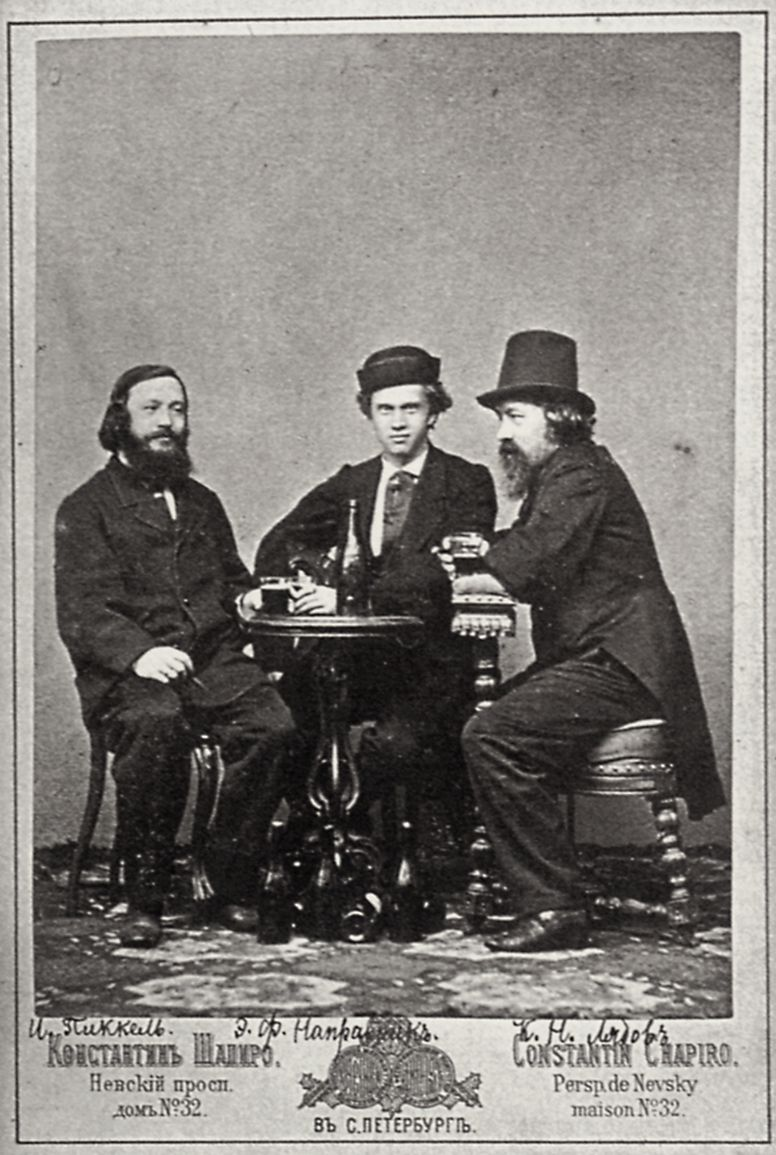
Apiro, Konstantin: The Violinist I. Pikkel and the Composers E. Napravnik and A. Lyadov. (at right) St. Petersburg

Konstantin Nikolayevich Lyadov (Константи́н Никола́евич Ля́дов), born on 6 (Note: According to the Julian calendar, which was in use in Russia at the time.)/28 (Note: According to the Gregorian calendar.) May 1820, in Saint Petersburg and died on 7/19 December 1871, in Saint Petersburg, was a Russian conductor, composer, and pianist. He was the father of Anatoly Lyadov, who was his second child.

== Biography ==
He was born on 6 May (Note: The birth date of 28 April, inscribed on his grave at the cemetery of the Alexander Nevsky Lavra, is incorrect.) 1820, into the family of Nikolai Grigoryevich Lyadov (1777–1831), the kapellmeister (music director) of the Saint Petersburg Philharmonic Society. Konstantin was baptized on 8 May of that year at the Church of the Intercession in Kolomenskoye.

Beginning in May 1832, he studied at the Saint Petersburg Theatre School, taking courses in music theory under Carlo Soliva starting in 1834. By 1839, he was appearing in public as a composer, conductor, and arranger; within two years, six of his own works were presented to the public in theatres across Saint Petersburg and Moscow. Among these was the operetta-vaudeville *The Burgomaster’s Daughter* (*Дочь бургомистра*), performed in Saint Petersburg with a text translated from French by Pavel Fyodorov. He completed his studies at the theater school in 1841: "The musician Konstantin Lyadov—a graduate of the theater school—entered the service of the Imperial Theaters on 23 March 1841 [...] with the mandate to compose music, coach performers on vocal scores, conduct when necessary, study scores in the music office, correct scores, and add text to vocal scores".

During the summer of 1843, he vacationed in Vilna and Riga, where he met the family of a merchant named Antipov; he later asked for the hand of the merchant's daughter (one of the Antipov brothers would subsequently marry Konstantin Lyadov’s younger sister, Elena).

By 1849, he was effectively the principal conductor of the Russian opera troupe, and he served as the first principal conductor of the Mariinsky Theatre upon its opening in 1860. It was under Lyadov’s baton that the premieres of Dargomyzhsky's opera Rusalka and Serov's operas Judith and Rogneda—among others—took place. Lyadov resigned from the Mariinsky in 1869 due to health issues and was succeeded by Eduard Nápravník.

Between 1862 and 1864, he taught music theory and solfège at the Saint Petersburg Conservatory, where he also led the choral music class.

He composed the music for the ballet *The Two Sorceresses* (*Dve volshebnitsy*), as well as music for vaudeville, art songs (*romances*), piano pieces, and more. His most famous work is the fantasy *By the River, By the Bridge* (*Vozle rechki, vozle mosta*) for choir and orchestra. Liadov also orchestrated music by other composers. He revised the score for the ballet *Le Diable amoureux* for Marius Petipa.

Grave and tombstone of K. N. Lyadov (1820–1871), composer: 1 Alexander Nevsky Square. Necropolis of Masters of Arts (northern section), Tsentralny District, Saint Petersburg

Liadov was buried in the Smolensk Orthodox Cemetery in Saint Petersburg. In the 1930s, his grave was relocated to the Necropolis of Masters of the Arts at the Alexander Nevsky Lavra in Saint Petersburg.

== Personal life ==
In 1848 Konstantin Lyadov married Catherine Andreevna Antipova, a merchant's daughter. Their children were:

- Valentina (3.10.1849–1913); Lyadova-Pomazanskaya (in her first marriage – Sariotti), who became a dramatic actress of the Alexandrinsky Theatre
- Anatoly (30.4.1855—15.8.1914)

== Bibliography ==
- Музыкальная энциклопедия / Гл. ред. Ю. В. Келдыш. - М.: Советская энциклопедия, 1973-1982. (In Russian)
- Помазанский А. Е., Лядовы и Помазанские — музыкальная семья: Из истории русской музыкальной культуры XIX—XX веков. — СПб., 2014. (In Russian)
