= Nadezhda Deziderieva-Buda =

Russian mezzo-soprano

Nadezhda Alexandrovna Deziderieva-Buda (Russian: Надежда Александровна Дезидериева-Буда; 1922–2010) was a Russian mezzo-soprano at the Novosibirsk Opera and Ballet Theatre (1944–1964), director of the music school in Novosibirsk and cultural figure.

== Biography ==
Nadezhda Deziderieva-Buda was born on July 14, 1922, in Novonikolayevsk. Her father was a teacher of Russian language and literature.

She graduated from a music school (piano class, 1940), Vocal studio at the House of Folk Art, Novosibirsk Musical School (1950) and Novosibirsk Conservatory (1960).

In 1942–1944 Deziderieva-Buda was a soloist of the Novosibirsk Radio Committee.

From 1944 to 1964 she was an opera singer of the Novosibirsk Opera Theater.

In 1964–1979 Nadezhda Alexandrovna was the head of the Children's Music School No. 1 in Novosibirsk.

She was repeatedly a deputy of the district council, worked as a freelance instructor in culture of the city party committee and led the united party organization at the department of culture of the city executive committee.

The opera singer died on December 5, 2010.

== Some roles ==
- Olga – Eugene Onegin by Pyotr Tchaikovsky
- Siebel – Faust by Charles Gounod
- Konchakovna – Prince Igor by Alexander Borodin
- Princess – Rusalka by Alexander Dargomyzhsky
- Marina Mnishek – Boris Godunov by Modest Mussorgsky
- Lyubava Buslayevna – Sadko by Nikolai Rimsky-Korsakov
