= Dmitry Averkiyev =

Russian playwright (1836–1905)

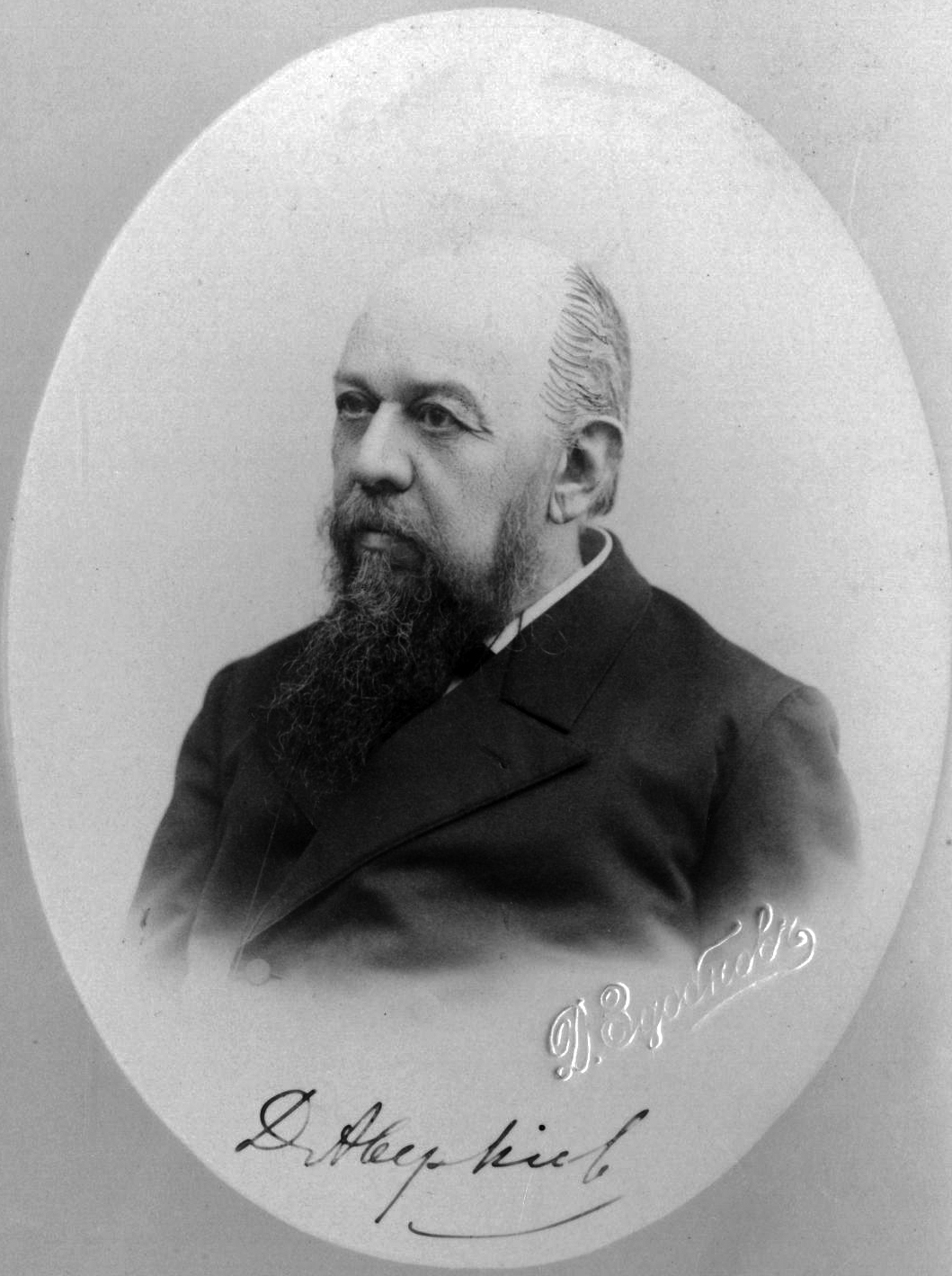
- Born: Дмитрий Васильевич Аверкиев; October 12, 1836; Ekaterinodar, Russian Empire
- Died: January 20, 1905 (aged 68); Saint Petersburg, Russian Empire
- Occupations: theatre critic, playwright, novelist, translator, librettist

Dmitry Vasilyevich Averkiyev (Russian: Дмитрий Васильевич Аверкиев; October 12, 1836, in Yekaterinodar, Russian Empire – January 20, 1905, in Saint Petersburg, Russian Empire) was a Russian playwright, theatre critic, novelist, publicist and translator.

Averkiyev's best known plays were Frol Skobeyev (Фрол Скобеев, 1869) and Old Times in Kashira (Каширская старина, 1872); both continued to be produced into the Soviet times. He was also an acclaimed theatre critic who contributed to Epokha, Moskovskiye Vedomosti, Novoye Vremya and Vsemirnaya Illyustratsiya (where he was the head of the literary section, in 1869–1871). Averkiyev's magnum opus On Drama won him the Pushkin Prize in 1893.

Averkiyev authored the Russian libretto to Rogneda by Alexander Serov. Tikhon Khrennikov's opera Frol Skobeyev (1950) is based on Averkiyev's play of the same name.
