= Valentina Serova (composer) =

Russian composer (1846–1924)

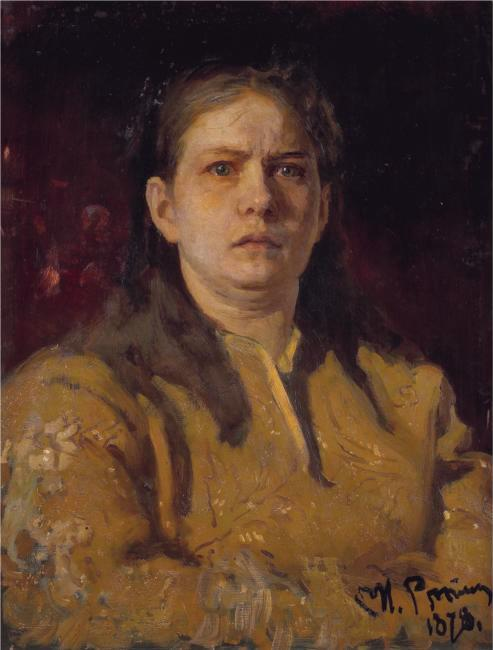
Valentina Serova as Sophia Alekseyevna. Painting by Ilya Repin (1878)

Valentina Semyonova Serova (maiden name Bergman) (1846 – June 26, 1924) was a Russian composer of Jewish descent. Her family had converted to Reformed Protestantism before she was born.

== Early life ==
Serova's father Simon Bergman was a German-Jewish merchant who lived in Warsaw and operated a jewelry shop; her mother Augusta Hudschon (Augustina Hudson) was a German-Jew as well born in Amsterdam. They moved to Saint-Petersburg from Warsaw in the late 1830-s.

She studied briefly at the St. Petersburg Conservatory with Anton Rubinstein but left to study with the composer and critic Alexander Serov, known both for his writings and his successful first opera Judith. Introduced through a shared friend, she married Serov in 1863 and in January 1865 their son Valentin Serov was born. Valentin would grow up to become a famous painter, renowned for his portraits.

== The Power of the Fiend ==
Alexander Serov died of a heart attack in January 1871, and Valentina completed the last act of his third and final opera, The Power of the Fiend. She used his sketches and her memory of what Alexander had played to her to finish the work. The composer N.F. Solovyov helped her with some of the instrumentation and editing. The opera premiered in April 1871. Initially unsuccessful, its revivals fared rather better and was the only opera by Serov to be performed in Soviet times.

== Second marriage ==
After Serov's death she married a second time to a physician, Vasilii Nemchinov, who died in 1881. They had two children; a son who died in childhood and a daughter, Nadezhda, who married into the aristocratic Zhilinsky family. Serova's son-in-law and grandson from Nadezhda's marriage were both executed during Stalin's rule. One of her great-grandsons perished in World War II; the other was the painter Dmitry Zhilinsky.

== Composer ==
The experience of finishing her first husband's opera inspired Serova to compose her own operas. Her first opera, Uriel Acosta, premiered in 1885 at the Bolshoi Theatre in Moscow. She had shown the score to Tchaikovsky earlier that year, and he had pointed out a number of faults. Valentina asked him if he would give her some lessons in harmony, but he recommended she seek out the guidance of Anton Arensky instead. Her second opera, Maria d'Orval, was never performed and is considered lost. Her third opera, Il'ya Muromets, was successfully staged in Moscow with Feodor Chaliapin in the title role in 1899. Serova's fourth and last opera has not been preserved and even the title is now unknown. She died in Moscow on June 26, 1924.

== Relatives ==
Valentina Serova's sister, Adelaida, and brother-in-law, Yakov Simonovich, were early childhood pedagogues who, in 1863, founded Russia's first kindergarten. Her son, Valentin, married their adopted daughter, Olga Trubnikova, and had five children with descendants now living in Russia, France, Cyprus, and Lebanon.

== Sources ==
- www.classical-composers.org
