= The Stone Guest (Dargomyzhsky) =

Opera by Alexander Dargomyzhski

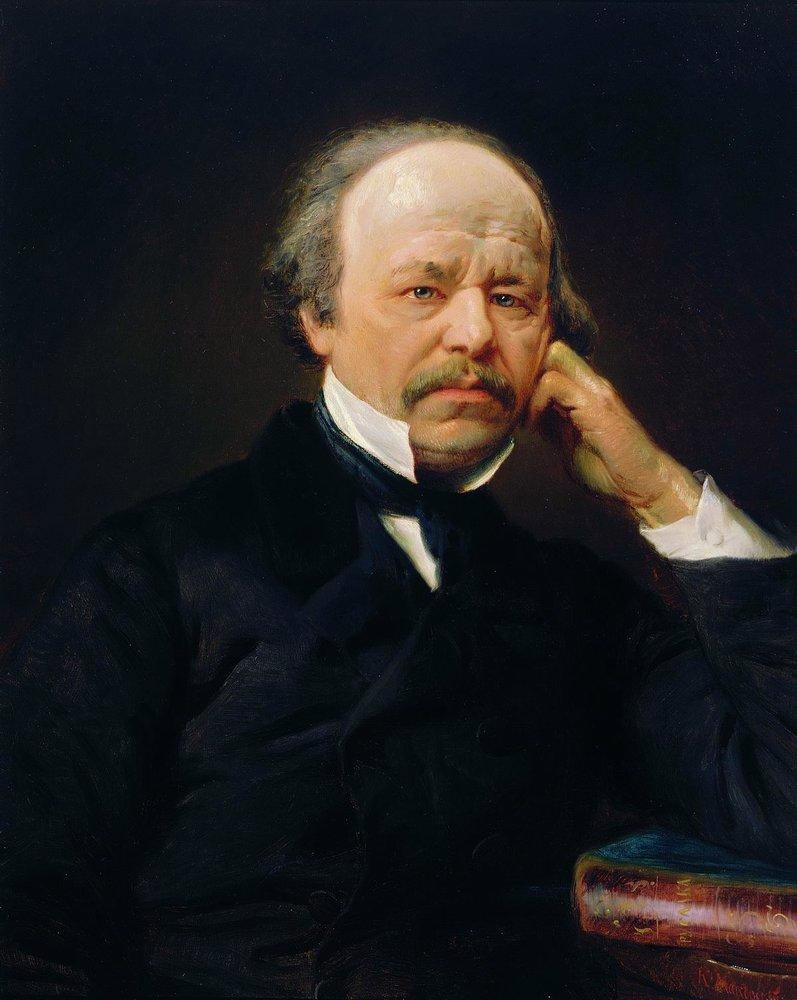
Alexander Dargomyzhsky

The Stone Guest (Каменный гость in Cyrillic, Kamennyj gost' in transliteration) is an opera in three acts by Alexander Dargomyzhsky. In what was considered a bold innovation at the time, Dargomyzhsky himself extracted the libretto directly from Alexander Pushkin's 1830 play of the same name, written in blank verse as part of Pushkin's collection Little Tragedies, using the text in its entirety and unchanged.

It was first performed at the Mariinsky Theatre, Saint Petersburg, 16 February 1872 (Old Style).

According to the composer's wishes, the last few lines of tableau 1 were composed by César Cui, and the whole was orchestrated by Nikolai Rimsky-Korsakov. Many years later, Rimsky-Korsakov revised his own orchestration of the opera, rewrote a few of Dargomyzhsky's own original passages, and added an orchestral prelude. This version, completed in 1903 and first performed in 1907 at the Bolshoi Theatre, is now considered the standard version.

== Performance History ==
The Austrian premiere of the opera was given in 1928 at the Salzburg Festival, in a production by students of the Leningrad Conservatoire. In 1952 it was performed in Italian, at the Maggio Musicale Fiorentino Festival. The United States premiere of the opera was presented in 1986, by the Chamber Opera Theater of New York at the Marymount Manhattan Theater in New York City with Ron Gentry as Don Juan, Randolf Messing as Don Carlos, Sally Stevens as Donna Anna, and Vladimir Kin conducting.

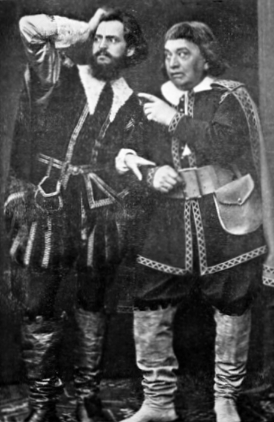
Komissarzhevsky
and Petrov

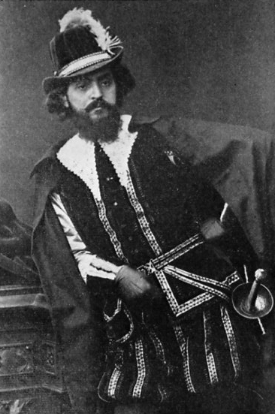
Fyodor Komissarzhevsky
as Don Juan

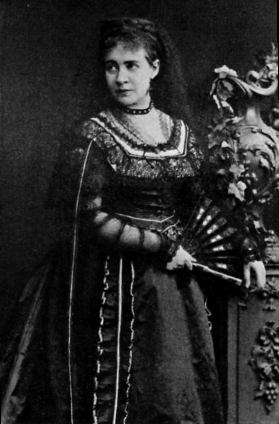
Yuliya Platonova
as Donna Anna

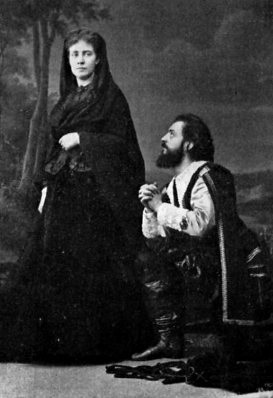
Platonova
and Komissarzhevsky

== Roles ==
Role	Voice type	Premiere Cast 16 February 1872 (Old Style) (Conductor: Eduard Nápravník)
Don Juan	tenor	Fyodor Komissarzhevsky
Leporello, his servant	bass	Osip Petrov
Donna Anna	soprano	Yuliya Platonova
Don Carlos	baritone	Ivan Melnikov
Laura	mezzo-soprano	Mariya Ilyina
A Monk	bass	Vladimir Sobolev
First Guest	tenor	Vasiliy Vasilyev (Vasilyev II)
Second Guest	bass	Mikhail Sariotti
Statue of the Commander	bass	Vladimir Sobolev

== Style ==
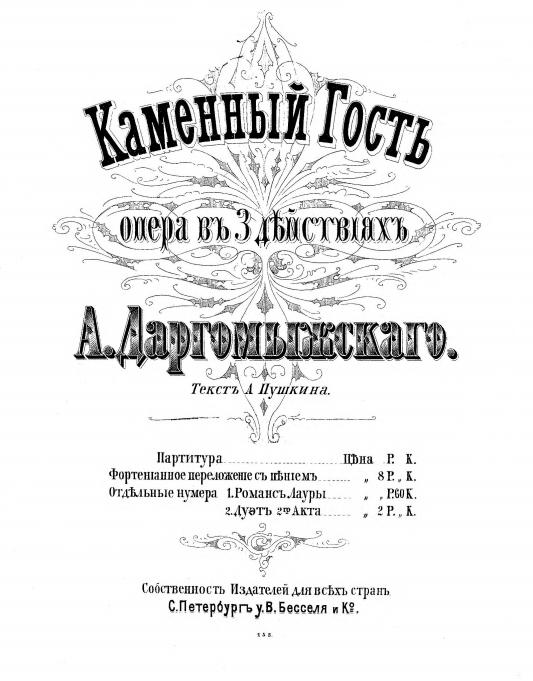
Title page of the score of The Stone Guest (V. Bessel and Co., Saint Petersburg)

As an opera, The Stone Guest is notable for having its text taken almost word-for-word from the literary stage work which inspired it, rather than being set to a libretto adapted from the source in order to accommodate opera audiences which would have expected to hear arias, duets, and choruses. Consequently, the resulting musical drama consists almost entirely of solos given in turn by each character, as in a spoken play.

This procedure amounted to a radical statement about the demands of spoken and musical drama and was seen by some as a devaluation of the musical genre of opera, and distinct from the literary genre of spoken drama. Tchaikovsky in particular was critical of the idea; in response to Dargomyzhky's statement that "I want sound directly to express the word. I want truth", he wrote in his private correspondence that nothing could be so "hateful and false" as the attempt to present as musical drama something that was not.

== The value of the opera ==
The opera was written at the time of the formation of realism in art, and The Stone Guest corresponded to this genre. Dargomyzhsky used the ideas of the society of The Five.

The great innovations of this opera are seen in its style. It was written without arias and ensembles (not counting two small romances sung by Laura) and it is entirely built on the "melodic recitative" of the human voice put to music. This was immediately noted by Russian musical specialists César Cui and Alexander Serov.

Opera has been greatly important in the formation of Russian musical culture which, built entirely on European music, found its place in the world's musical culture.

The innovations begun by Dargomyzhsky were continued by other composers. Firstly, they were taken up and developed by Modest Mussorgsky who called Dargomyzhsky "the teacher of musical truth". Later the principles of Dargomyzhsky's art were embodied by Mussorgsky in his operas Boris Godunov and Khovanshchina; Mussorgsky continued and strengthened this new musical tradition. Other Russians operas have also incorporated the same stylistic elements, including settings of the three remaining Little Tragedies of Pushkin. These are Mozart and Salieri by Rimsky-Korsakov (1898); Feast in Time of Plague by Cesar Cui (1901); and The Miserly Knight by Sergei Rachmaninov (1904).

The modern Russian music critic Viktor Korshikov thus summed up:

There is not the development of Russian musical culture without The Stone Guest. It is three operas - Ivan Soussanine, Ruslan and Ludmila and The Stone Guest have created Mussorgsky, Rimsky-Korsakov, and Borodin. Soussanine is an opera, where the main character is the people, Ruslan is the mythical, deeply Russian intrigue, and The Guest, in which the drama dominates over the softness of the beauty of sound.

== Recordings ==
Audio

- 1946, Aleksandr Orlov (conductor), USSR Radio Symphony Orchestra and Chorus, Dmitriy Tarkhov (Don Juan), Georgiy Abramov (Leporello), Nina Aleksandriyskaya (Laura), Daniil Demyanov (Don Carlos), Gugo Tits, V. Nevskiy (Guests), Natalya Rozhdestvenskaya (Doña Anna), Konstantin Polyayev (Monk), Aleksey Korolyov (Commander)
- 1959, Boris Khaikin (conductor), Moscow Radio Opera and Symphony Orchestra and Chorus, Alexei Maslennikov (Don Juan), Georgi Pankov (Leporello), Irina Arkhipova (Laura), Vladimir Zakharov (Don Carlos), Galina Vishnevskaya (Doña Anna), Alexei Korolev (Monk), Gennady Troitsky (Commander), Alexei Usmanov (First Guest), Andrei Blagov (Second Guest)
- 1977, Mark Ermler (conductor), Bolshoy Theatre Orchestra and Chorus, Vladimir Atlantov (Don Juan), Alexander Vedernikov (Leporello), Tamara Sinyavskaya (Laura), Vladimir Valaitis (Don Carlos), Vitaliy Vlasov, Vitaliy Nartov (Guests), Tamara Milashkina (Doña Anna), Lev Vernigora (Monk), Vladimir Filippov (Commander)
- 1995, Andrey Chistyakov (conductor), Bolshoy Theatre Orchestra and Chorus, Nikolay Vasiliyev (Don Juan), Vyacheslav Pochapsky (Leporello), Tatyana Yerastova (Laura), Nikolay Reshetnyak (Don Carlos), Marina Lapina (Doña Anna), Boris Bezhko (Monk), Nikolay Nizyenko (Commander)

Video

- 1979, Mark Ermler (conductor), Bolshoy Theatre Orchestra and Chorus, Vladimir Atlantov (Don Juan), Tamara Milashkina (Doña Anna), Alexander Vedernikov (Leporello), Tamara Sinyavskaya (Laura), Vladimir Valaitis (Don Carlos), Vladimir Filippov (Monk, Commander), Andrey Sokolov, Pyotr Glubokiy (Guests)
