= The Stone Guest (play) =

Play by Alexander Pushkin

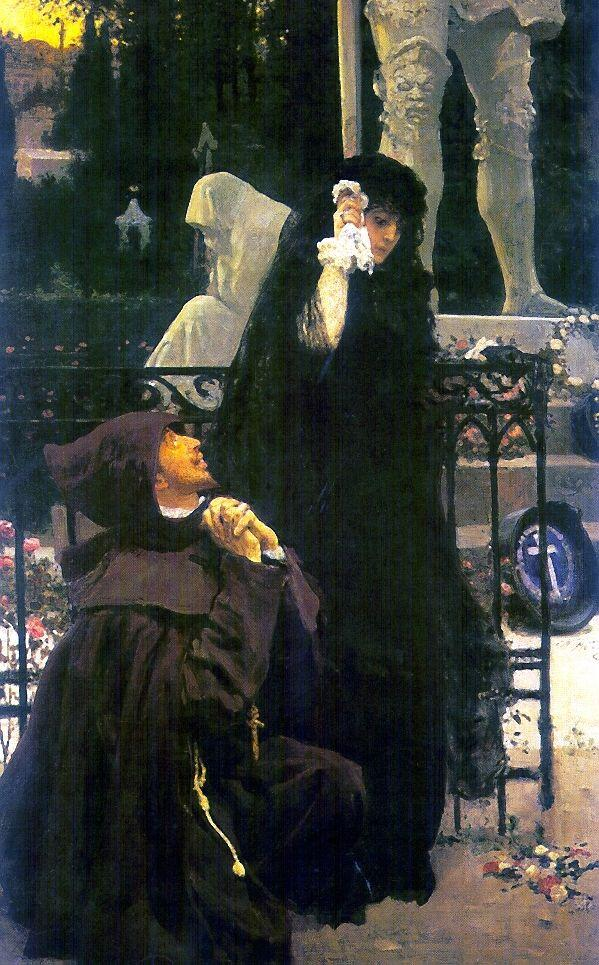
The Stone Guest. Don Juan and Doña Ana, by Ilya Repin, 1885

The Stone Guest (Russian: «Каменный гость», romanized: Kamennyy gost') is a poetic drama by Alexander Pushkin based on the Spanish legend of Don Juan.

== History ==
Pushkin wrote The Stone Guest in 1830 as part of a collection of four short plays known as Little Tragedies. The play is based on the familiar Don Juan legend (translated with the archaic Russian spelling of Don Guan (Дон Гуан)), but while most traditional adaptations present it as farcical and comedic, Pushkin's "little tragedy" is indeed a romantic tragedy. Save for the duel, there is little action, and though written in the form of a play, scholars agree that it was never meant for the stage.

Pushkin wrote the play after seeing the premiere of a Russian-language version of Mozart's 1787 opera Don Giovanni. He borrowed certain elements from da Ponte's libretto, but made the story his own, focusing more on the tragic romantic elements than on the farcical ones.

== Synopsis ==
Don Juan, illegally returned from exile for having murdered Commander de Salva, seduces the latter's widow, Doña Ana, when she visits the grave of her late husband. Doña Ana agrees to let him visit her home. Don Juan arrogantly invites the grave statue of the Commander to stand watch. When Juan and Ana are together, they hear the stone steps of the Commander. The statue offers a hand to Don Juan, he boldly takes it, and they both descend below the stage.

== Influence ==
Alexander Dargomyzhsky adapted the play into an opera, The Stone Guest, in 1872. In 2012 the English composer Philip Godfrey adapted the play into an operetta, also called The Stone Guest.

The phrases "Commander's steps" or "steps of the Commander" have become winged words in Russian culture in reference to an approach of a sinister fate. Alexander Blok wrote a poem in 1912 titled Commander's Steps (Шаги Командора). Venedikt Erofeev subtitled his final completed work Walpurgis Night "the Steps of the Commander."
