= Nicolai Soloviev =

Russian composer

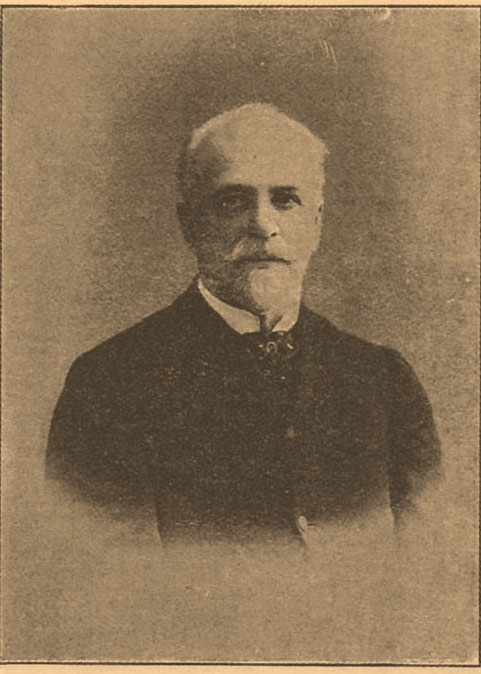
Nicolai Soloviev

Nicolai Feopemptovich Soloviev (Russian: Никола́й Феопе́мптович Соловьёв; Petrozavodsk, 9 May [O.S. 27 April] 1846 – 27 December [O.S. 14 December] 1916 in Petrograd (Saint Petersburg)), sometimes Solovyov, was a Russian music critic, composer, and teacher at the Saint Petersburg Conservatory. His notable composition students include Samuel Maykapar, Mihkel Lüdig, Artur Lemba, and Peeter Süda. See: List of music students by teacher: R to S#Nicolai Soloviev. Soloviev composed several operas, an overture, and the symphonic poem Russians and Mongols, and assisted in the completion of Alexander Serov's opera, The Power of the Fiend.

As a music critic, Soloviev supported the works of composers such as Modest Mussorgsky and Nikolai Rimsky-Korsakov, while trouncing the work of other composers. Of Pyotr Ilyich Tchaikovsky's First Piano Concerto he wrote, "Tchaikovsky's First Piano Concerto, like the first pancake, is a flop."
