= Rusalka (Dargomyzhsky) =

Opera by Alexander Dargomyzhsky

- Opera by Alexander Dargomyzhsky
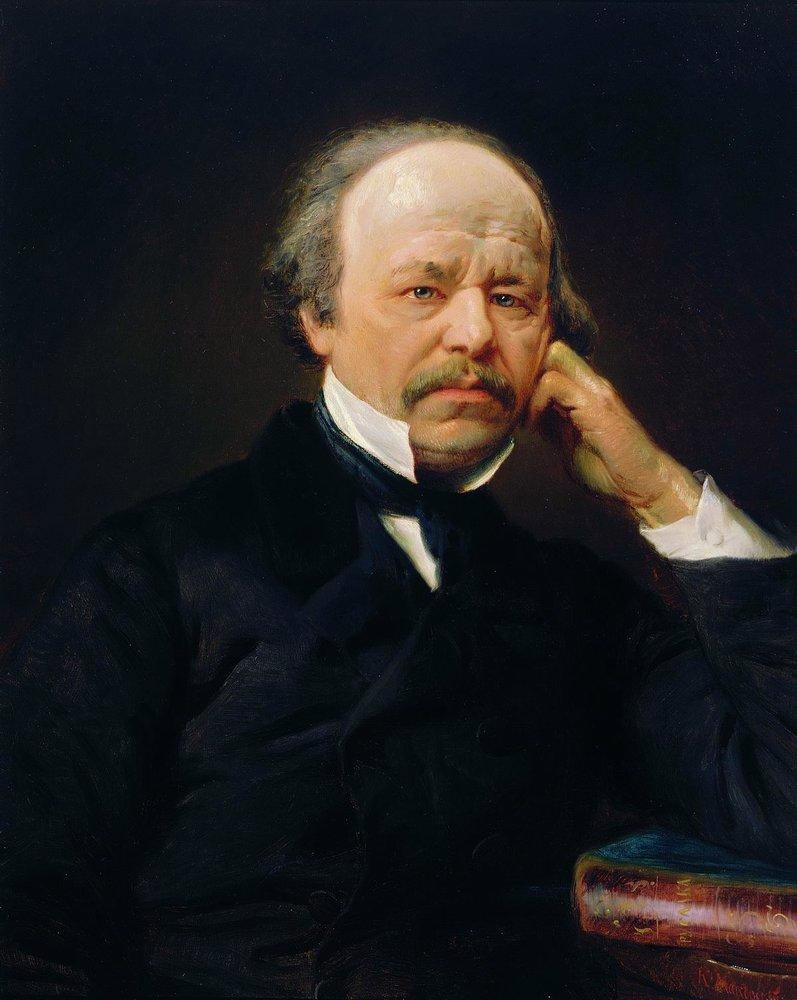
- The composer
- Librettist: Alexander Dargomyzhsky
- Language: Russian
- Based on: Aleksandr Pushkin's incomplete dramatic poem
- Premiere: 4 May 1859; Theatre-circus, Moscow

Rusalka (Russian: Русалка, romanized: Rusálka) is an opera in four acts, six tableaux, by Alexander Dargomyzhsky, composed during 1848-1855. The Russian libretto was adapted by the composer from Aleksandr Pushkin's incomplete dramatic poem of the same name. It premiered on 4 May 1856 (Old Style) at the Theatre-circus, conducted by Konstantin Lyadov (father of Anatoly Lyadov), choreographed by Marius Petipa and Nikolay Goltz, but was badly received predominantly by the aristocracy.

In 1859, the opera was again presented at the Bolshoi Theatre in Moscow, but it was not until 1865, when it was staged at the Mariinsky Theatre, that it was finally well received. The conductor was Eduard Nápravník; the Prince was sung by Fyodor Petrovich Komissarzhevsky, the Princess by Darya Leonova, Miller by Osip Petrov, and Natasha by Yulya Platonova.

Although much of Dargomyzhsky's Rusalka is fairly conventional in musical form and style, its singular innovation for the history of Russian music in particular is the application of "melodic recitative" at certain points in the drama. This type of recitative consists of lyrical utterances which change continuously according to the dramatic situation, with likewise varied accompaniment in the orchestra. Dargomyzhsky was to apply this technique of vocal composition on a small scale in his songs and on a large scale in his final opera, The Stone Guest.

It was mounted at the Wexford Opera Festival in 1997 with Anna Maria Chiuri in the title role, and Alessandro Safina as the prince and Maxim Mikhailov as the miller.

The opera was translated into English by Leonard & Emily R. Lehrman in 1986. Excerpts from that translation were performed in concerts in France in 1989, 1990, 1992, 1994, and 1996, and in New York in 2015. The entire work was performed in English for the first time at Queens College, Nov. 22, 2015. The cast included Helene Williams (Natasha), Gregory Mercer (the Prince), Perri Sussman (the Princess), David Anchel (the Miller & the Matchmaker), Kathryn Wieckhorst (Olga), Jackie Bakewell (Rusalochka), and The Metropolitan Philharmonic Chorus, conducted from the piano by Leonard Lehrman.

The last act of the opera, which features a ballet, is somewhat unusual in that a 12-year-old rusalka speaks her lines over the music.

== Roles ==
Role	Voice type	Premiere Cast 4 May 1856 (Old Style) (Conductor: Konstantin Lyadov ), Theatre-circus
The Prince	tenor	Pavel Bulakhov
The Princess	mezzo-soprano	Darya Leonova
The Miller	bass	Osip Petrov
Natasha, his daughter, later a Rusalka	soprano	Anisya Bulakhova
Ol'ga, an orphan, devoted to the Princess	soprano	Emiliya Lileyeva
A Matchmaker	baritone	Pyotr Gumbin
Little Rusalka, 12 years old	non singing	
Chorus: Boyars, boyarynyas, hunters, peasant men and women, and rusalki

== Synopsis ==
The action takes place by the Dnieper River

The plot tells of a maiden who, after being jilted by a prince, drowns herself (hence the designation "rusalka," or "drowned maiden").

=== Act 1 ===
The bank of the Dnieper River. A mill near an oak tree. Natacha, daughter of the miller awaits the prince who she is in love with; she ignores her father's warnings about such an alliance. The prince greets her, but unable to tell them that he is to wed a rich princess showers them in gifts. While peasants sing and dance for the miller the prince and Natacha go in the mill, where she discovers the truth but then reveals to him that she is carrying his child. The miller tries to console his daughter but she throws herself in the river.

=== Act 2 ===
A rich mansion. A princely wedding. The marriage of the prince and princess is being celebrated. But in the midst of the happiness a distant voice is heard – that of Natacha. The prince orders his equerry to find out what is happening, raising the suspicions of the princess. As the party recommences a groan is heard.

=== Act 3 ===
Scene 1: A tower chamber. A drawing room. After their wedding the prince has abandoned the princess who confesses her worries to Olga. A hunter has found the prince wandering the banks of the Dniepr and is sent off to bring him home.

Scene 2: The bank of the Dnieper River. The ruined mill. Evening. The rusalkas sing in the river. The prince observes the waters, recalling his love for Natacha. The miller appears, mad with despair and announces that his grand-daughter the rusalka is taking care of him. The prince thinks he has gone mad, and when his invitation to the miller to come to his castle is rejected, rushes away.

=== Act 4 ===
Scene 1: The bottom of the Dnieper. The underwater palace of the Rusalki. Rusalkas dance in the river; Natacha is now their queen. Her daughter brings news of the miller. But Natacha with new hope, asks her daughter to bring the prince to her one evening.

Scene 2: The bank of the Dnieper River. The ruined mill. The princess and Olga have followed the prince to the riverbank and watch on as he meets the young rusalka; as he follows her they emerge and try to prevent him going. But they are thwarted by the voice of Natacha who lures the prince. The miller suddenly bursts from the forest and pushes the prince into the deep river, to the laughter of the rusalkas, who present his body to their queen.

== Principal arias and numbers ==
Act 1

Aria: "Oh, it's just that all you young girls...", «Ох, то-то все вы, девки молодые...» (Miller)

== Related works ==
Other operas featuring rusalki as characters include Rimsky-Korsakov's May Night and Dvořák's Rusalka.
