= Judith (Serov) =

Opera in five acts

- Opera by Alexander Serov
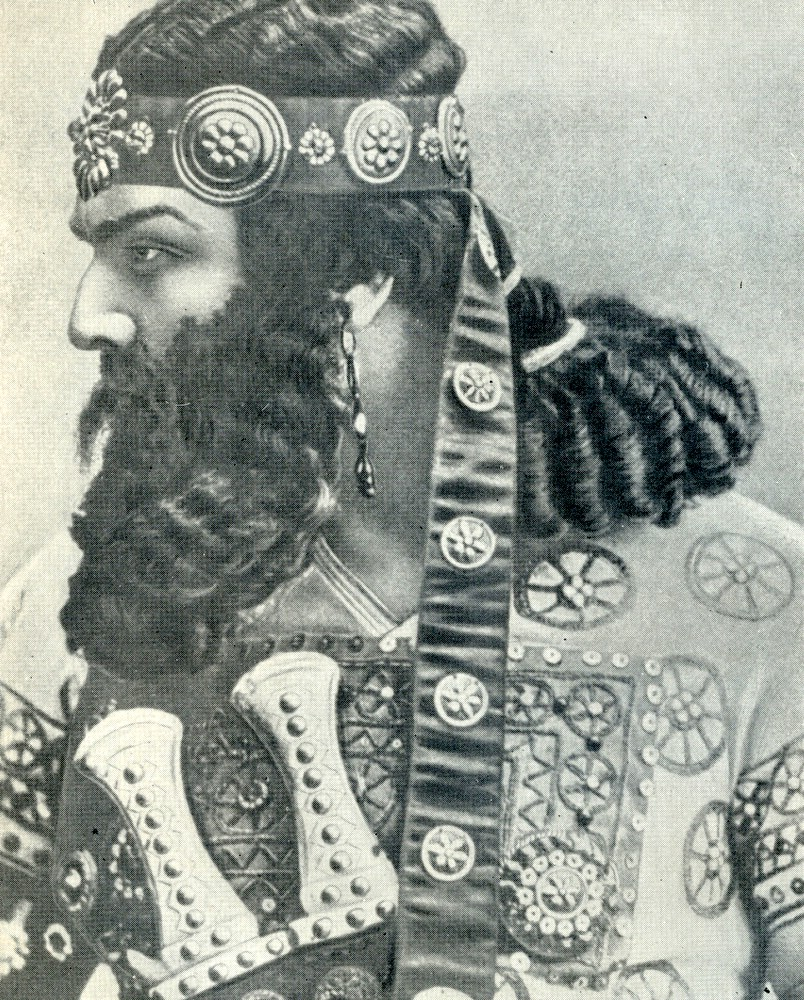
- Fyodor Shalyapin as Holofernes in 1898
- Native title: Russian: Юдифь
- Librettist: Alexander Serov; Ivan Antonovich Giustiniani (in Italian); Konstantin Zvantsov; Dmitry Lobanov
- Language: Russian
- Based on: Book of Judith
- Premiere: 16 May 1863; Mariinsky Theatre, Saint Petersburg

Judith (Russian: Юдифь, romanized: Yudíf – stress on second syllable) is an opera in five acts, composed by Alexander Serov during 1861–1863. Derived from renditions of the story of Judith from the Old Testament Apocrypha, the Russian libretto, though credited to the composer, has a complicated history. The premiere took place in 1863 in Saint Petersburg. This stage debut, supplemented with his next opera Rogneda, made Serov the most important Russian opera composer of the 1860s.

== Composition history ==
The Italian play Giuditta by Paolo Giacometti, produced in Saint Petersburg in 1860, first inspired Serov to work on the project as a vehicle for the Italian opera troupe in Saint Petersburg. Using Serov's scenario, Ivan Antonovich Giustiniani wrote a libretto in Italian. When an Italian production of the proposed opera proved legally impossible, the Italian libretto was translated into Russian by Konstantin Zvantsov and Dmitry Lobanov, and some verses were added by the poet Apollon Maykov; in the meantime, the composer was writing the music without having the words ahead of time.

== Performance history ==
The world premiere was given on 16 May 1863 at the Mariinsky Theatre, St. Petersburg, conducted by Konstantin Lyadov and starring Mikhail Sariotti as Holofernes and Valentina Bianki as Judith.

The Moscow premiere took place in 1865 at the Bolshoy Theatre in Moscow conducted by Shramek.

== Publication history ==
- 1885, piano-vocal score, Gutheil, Moscow
- 1903, full score, Belyayev, Leipzig

== Roles ==
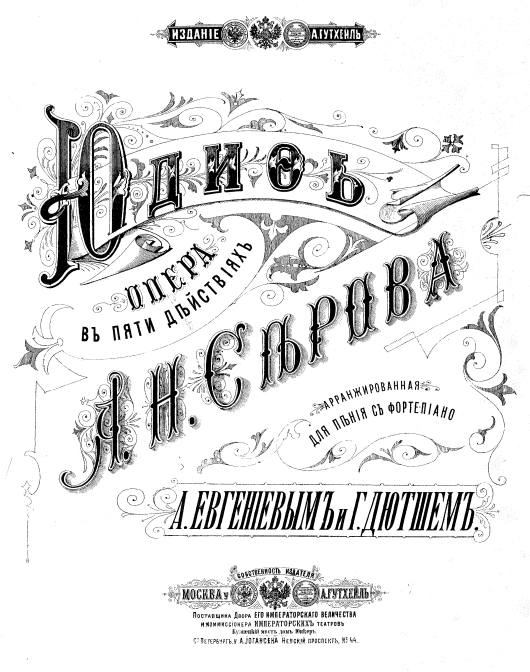
Title page of a piano-vocal score of Judith (Gutheil, Moscow)

- Judith, an Israelite woman, widow of a Jewish warrior: soprano
- Avra, her slave: mezzo-soprano
- Ozias, an elder of the city of Bethulia: bass
- Charmis, an elder of the city of Bethulia: bass
- Eliachim, Jewish high priest: bass
- Achior, chief of the Ammonites, subjugated to Holofernes: tenor
- Holofernes, Assyrian commander: bass
- Asfaneses, retainer of Holofernes: bass
- Bagoas, head of Holofernes' harem: tenor
- 1st Odalisque: soprano
- 2nd Odalisque: mezzo-soprano
- People, Jewish warriors, odalisques, Assyrian chiefs and warriors, feasters, male and female slaves of Holofernes

== Synopsis ==
Time: The 6th Century BC.
Place: In and around Bethulia

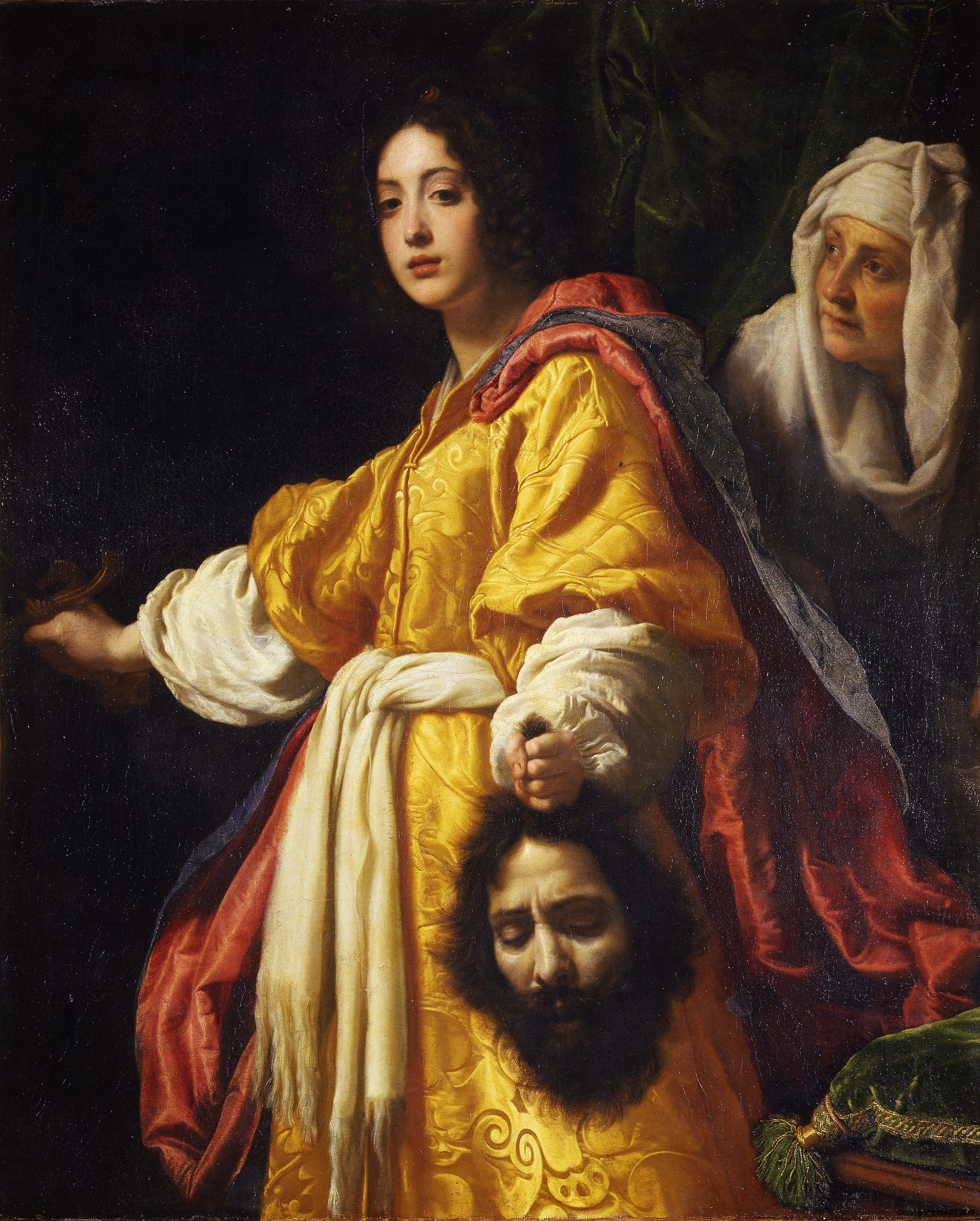
Judith with the Head of Holophernes, by Cristofano Allori, 1613 (Pitti Palace, Florence)

=== Act 1 ===
At midday in a square in Bethulia, which is still under siege by Holofernes and his Assyrian troops, the people suffer from despair and thirst. The elders Ozias and Charmi report that all the roads are now cut off, and the last source of water has dried up. The high priest Eliachim, however, hopes for a miracle, but the people want to surrender the city to end their suffering. The elders ask them to wait five more days and nights; after that time, if God does not deliver them, the city will let the enemy in. Jewish warriors then come through the gates holding Achior. He tried to persuade Holofernes to stop the siege and follow the God of the Jews; as punishment, Holofernes had him bound and left near the city to share in the Jews' destruction by the Assyrians. Everyone then prays to God for deliverance.

=== Act 2 ===
Judith, alone in her room, decides that, instead of waiting five days, something must be done now. She devises a plan to use the beauty God gave her in order to trick Holofernes and save her people. To her summons the elders arrive. She expresses her pro-active intentions and asks for permission to go to the enemy camp with her slave Avra. They grant permission and leave. When Avra then tries to talk her out of going to the camp, Judith remains steadfast.

=== Act 3 ===
In Holofernes' camp, odalisques perform songs and dances. Holofernes sends them away, intent on his plan to make a full attack on Bethulia the next day. Judith is let into the camp and presented to Holofernes, who is enchanted by her beauty (as are all the Assyrians). When he inquires as to her purpose, she pretends that she will show him a secret way to enter and take Bethulia and Jerusalem as long as he allows her to move freely. Holofernes believes her ruse, even to the point of asking her to be queen. The camp then celebrates the power of Babylon.

=== Act 4 ===
Dances and songs once more resound in the camp. Amidst praise of comely Judith, Asfaneses makes an unfortunate remark about her coldness, and is immediately stabbed to death by Holofernes. Just then Judith comes out and is horrified by the grisly act, but remains resolved in her plan. He informs her that the city will be attacked the next day. In a drunken stupor Holofernes falls to the ground unconscious at Judith's feet. After he is placed on his bed, she remains with him as everyone else leaves. Within the tent she takes his sword and decapitates him. After asking Avra to put the head into a sack, the two of them leave quickly.

=== Act 5 ===
In Bethulia the people, awaiting the dawn of the sixth day, are ready to open the gates to the Assyrians, despite pleadings from the high priest. Suddenly Judith is heard outside the gates, and she shows them the head of Holofernes. The sounds of the fleeing Assyrian troops are confirmed by Ozias' report. All sing praise to God for answering their prayers.

== Principal arias and numbers ==
- Introduction (or Overture)
- Judith's Monologue (Act II)
- Holofernes' March (Entr'acte before Act III)
- Dances (Act III)
- Bacchic Dance of the Odalisques and Dance of the Two Almahs (Act IV)
- Indian Song (Act IV)

== Influences ==
Despite completely lacking in "Russian" subject matter as well as being not the first opera based on the story of Judith, Serov's setting has great significance for the history of Russian music. Besides its success with the public (enhanced by Fyodor Chaliapin's portrayal of Holofernes beginning in 1898), Serov's Judith influenced later Russian composers, including:

- Tchaikovsky – The Maid of Orleans
- Mussorgsky – the unfinished Salammbô
- Borodin – Prince Igor
- Rubinstein – his biblical operas

The Eastern element in Judith is most obvious in Acts III and IV; its influence (presaged by Glinka in Ruslan and Lyudmila) can be detected by comparing the Indian Song from Act IV with the "Song of the Indian Guest" from Rimsky-Korsakov's Sadko.

== Recordings ==
- 1991, Andrey Chistyakov (conductor), Bolshoy Theatre Orchestra, Russian Academic Choir of the USSR, Irina Udalova (Judith), Yelena Zaremba (Avra), Mikhail Krutikov (aka Svetlov) (Holofernes), Nikolay Vasilyev (Bagoas), Anatoly Babïkhin (Ozias), Vladimir Kudryachov (Achior), Stanislav Suleimanov (Asfaneses), Pyotr Gluboky (Eliachim), Maksim Mikhaylov (Charmis), Irina Zhurina and Marina Shutova (odalisques), Lev Kuznetsov (Hindu Song). Reissued Brilliant Classics 2011.

== See also ==
- Rogneda (1865)
- The Power of the Fiend (1871)
