= Anatoly Lyadov =

Russian composer (1855–1914)

- Анатолий Лядов
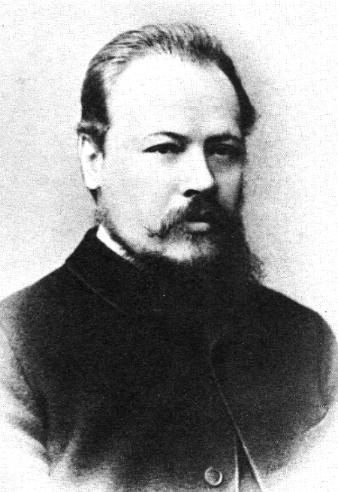
- Born: 12 May 1855; Saint Petersburg, Russian Empire
- Died: 28 August 1914 (aged 59); Polynovka, Borovichevsky, Novgorod Governorate, Russian Empire
- Occupations: Composer; teacher; conductor

Anatoly Konstantinovich Lyadov (Russian: Анато́лий Константи́нович Ля́дов; 12 May [O.S. 30 April] 1855 – 28 August [O.S. 15 August] 1914) was a Russian composer, teacher and conductor.

== Biography ==
Lyadov was born in 1855 in St. Petersburg, Russian Empire, into a family of eminent Russian musicians. He was taught informally by his conductor step-father, Konstantin Lyadov from 1860 to 1868, and then in 1870 entered the Saint Petersburg Conservatory to study piano and violin.

He soon gave up instrumental study to concentrate on counterpoint and fugue, although he remained a fine pianist. His musical talent was highly regarded by Modest Mussorgsky, among others, and during the 1870s he became associated with the group of composers known as The Five. Expelled from the composition classes of Nikolai Rimsky-Korsakov for absenteeism in 1876, he re-enrolled in 1878 in order to complete his graduation composition.

=== Family ===
- paternal grandfather – Nikolai G. Lyadov (Russian: Николай Григорьевич Лядов), conductor of the Petersburg Philharmonic Society
- father – Konstantin Lyadov (Константин Ладов), chief conductor of the Imperial Opera Company
- mother – V. Antipova, pianist
- sister – Valentina K. Lyadova (Russian: Валентина Лядова), dramatic actress
- brothers-in-law – Mikhail Sariotti (Russian: Михаил Сариотти), opera singer; Ivan Pomazanskiy (Russian: Иван Помазанский), musician
- paternal uncle – Alexander Lyadov (1818–1871; Russian: Александр Николаевич Лядов), orchestral conductor of the Imperial Ballroom
- cousin (uncle's daughter) – Vera Lyadova-Ivanova (1839–1870; Russian: Вера Александровна Лядова-Иванова), actress and singer known for performances in operettas, married to Lev Ivanov
- cousin's husband (divorced) – Lev Ivanov (Лев Иванов) ballet dancer and choreographer whose descendants now live in Iran with their second family (Zartari)

=== Teacher ===
He taught at the St. Petersburg Conservatory from 1878, with pupils including Sergei Prokofiev, Nikolai Myaskovsky, Mikhail Gnesin, Lazare Saminsky, Lyubov Streicher, and Boris Asafyev. See: List of music students by teacher: K to M#Anatoly Lyadov. Consistent with his character, he was a variable but at times brilliant instructor. Conductor Nikolai Malko, who studied harmony with him at the conservatory, wrote, "Lyadov's critical comments were always precise, clear, understandable, constructive, and brief.... And it was done indolently, without haste, sometimes seemingly disdainfully. He could suddenly stop in midword, take out some small scissors from his pocket and start doing something with his fingernail, while we all waited."

Igor Stravinsky remarked that Lyadov was as strict with himself as he was with his pupils, writing with great precision and demanding fine attention to detail. Prokofiev recalled that even the most innocent musical innovations drove the conservative Lyadov crazy. "Shoving his hands in his pockets and rocking in his soft woolen shoes without heels, he would say, 'I don't understand why you are studying with me. Go to Richard Strauss. Go to Debussy.' This was said in a tone that meant 'Go to the devil!'" Still, Lyadov said of Prokofiev to his acquaintances, "I am obliged to teach him. He must form his technique, his style—first in piano music." In 1905, he resigned his post over the dismissal of Rimsky-Korsakov, returning once Rimsky-Korsakov was reinstated.

=== Glazunov, Belyayev and Tchaikovsky ===
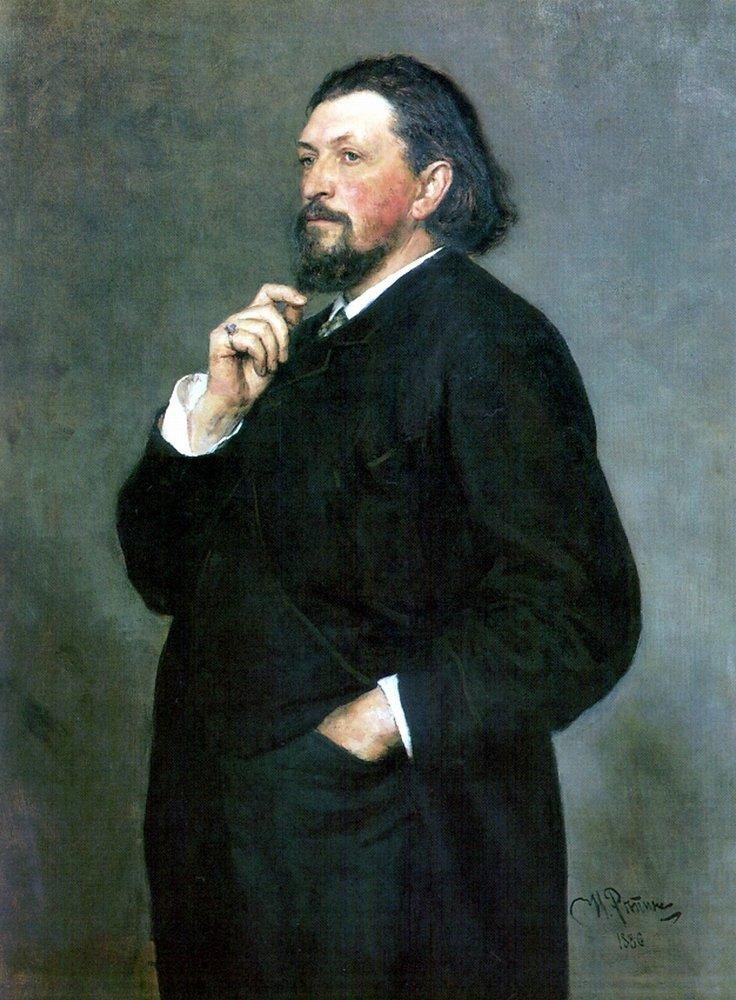
Portrait of M. P. Belyayev by Ilya Repin (1886)

Lyadov introduced timber millionaire and philanthropist Mitrofan Belyayev to the music of the teenage Alexander Glazunov. Interest in Glazunov's music quickly grew to Belyayev's patronage of an entire group of Russian nationalist composers. In 1884 Belyayev instituted the Russian Symphony Concerts and established the annual Glinka Prize. The following year he started his own publishing house in Leipzig. He published music by Glazunov, Lyadov, Rimsky-Korsakov and Borodin at his own expense. With young composers increasingly appealing to Belyayev for help, he asked Lyadov to serve on an advisory board to select among applicants, together with Glazunov and Rimsky-Korsakov. The group of composers that emerged in this ambit became known as the Belyayev Circle.

In November 1887, Lyadov met Pyotr Ilyich Tchaikovsky. Nearly seven years earlier Tchaikovsky had given a negative opinion to the publisher Bessel about a piano arabesque Lyadov had written. Even before this visit, though, there are indications that Tchaikovsky's opinion of Lyadov was evolving. He had, for example, presented Lyadov a copy of the score of his Manfred Symphony. Following their first meeting in person, the younger composer became "dear Lyadov." From winter of 1890, Tchaikovsky was a frequent visitor to Lyadov and the Belyayev Circle.

=== Later years ===
He married into money in 1884, acquiring through his marriage a country property in Polynovka, Borovichevsky, Novgorod Governorate, where he spent his summers composing unhurriedly, and where he died in 1914.

== Music ==
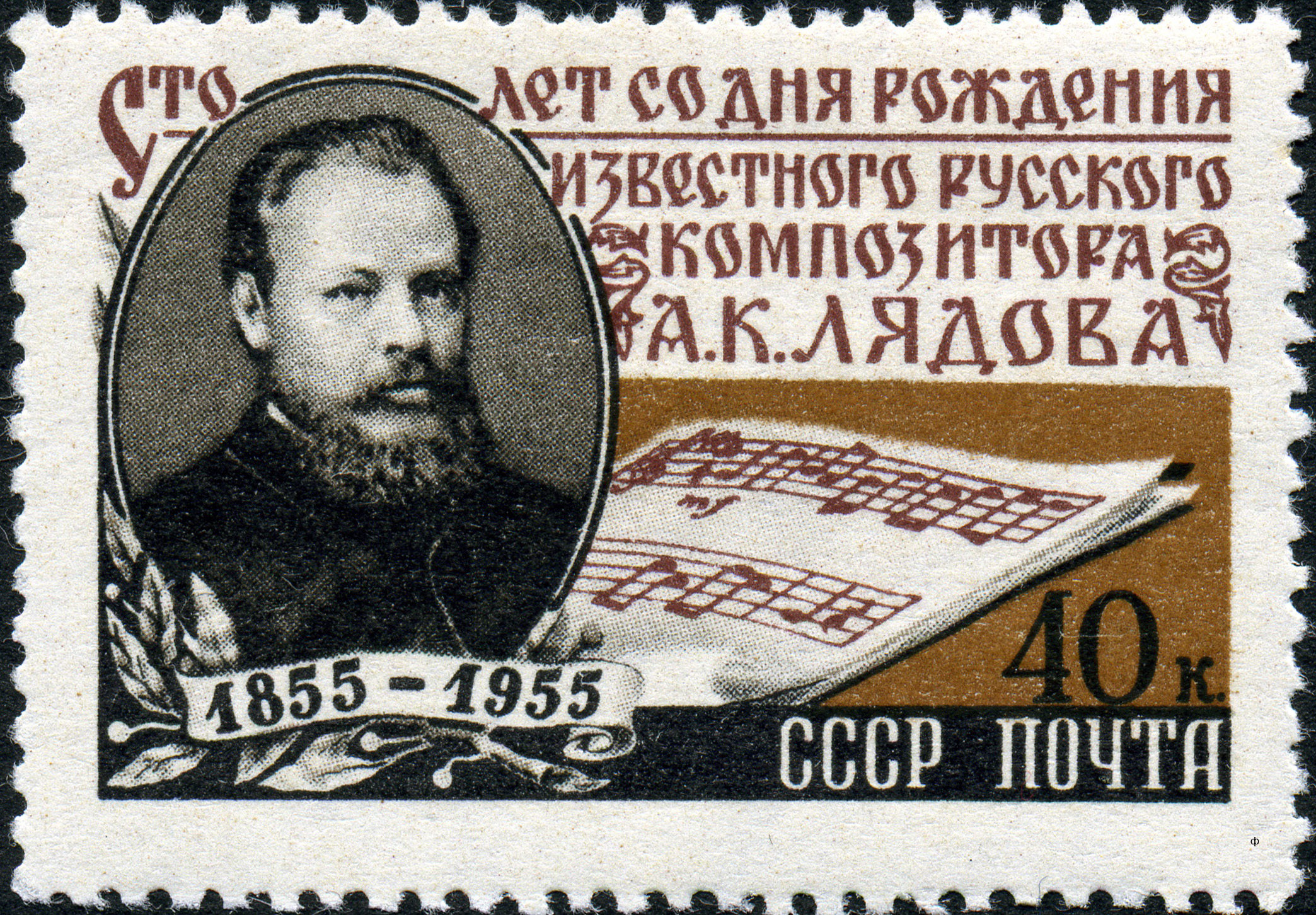
U.S.S.R. postage stamp commemorating Lyadov's centennial

While Lyadov's technical facility was highly regarded by his contemporaries, his unreliability stood in the way of his advancement. His published compositions are relatively few due to a certain self-critical lack of confidence. Many of his works are variations on or arrangements of pre-existing material (for example his Russian Folksongs, Op. 58). He did compose a large number of piano miniatures, of which his Musical Snuffbox of 1893 is perhaps most famous.

Like many of his contemporaries, Lyadov was drawn to intensely Russian subjects. Much of his music is programmatic; for example his tone poems Baba Yaga Op. 56, Kikimora Op. 63, The Enchanted Lake Op. 62 (inspired by the painting by Arseny Meshchersky, "The Enchanted Lake"). These short tone poems, probably his most popular works, exhibit an exceptional flair for orchestral tone colour. In his later compositions he experimented with extended tonality, like his younger contemporary Alexander Scriabin.

It has been argued that Lyadov never completed a large-scale work. However, many of his miniatures have their place in the repertory. In 1905 Lyadov began work on a new ballet score, but when the work failed to progress, he shifted gears to work on an opera instead. Lyadov never finished the opera, but sections of the work found realization in the short tone poems Kikimora and The Enchanted Lake.

In 1909 Sergei Diaghilev commissioned Lyadov to orchestrate a number for the Chopin-based ballet Les Sylphides, and on 4 September that year wrote to the composer asking for a new ballet score for the 1910 season of his Ballets Russes; however, despite the much-repeated story that Lyadov was slow to start composing the work which eventually became The Firebird (famously fulfilled by the then relatively inexperienced Igor Stravinsky), there is no evidence that Lyadov ever accepted the commission.

== Selected works ==
- Biryulki, 14 pieces for piano, Op. 2 (1876)
- Six Pieces for piano, Op. 3 (1876–1877)
1. Prelude in D major
2. Gigue in F major
3. Fugue in G minor
4. Mazurka in G major
5. Mazurka in B major
6. Mazurka in C major
- Four Arabesques for piano, Op. 4 (1878)
1. Arabesque in C♯ minor
2. Arabesque in A major
3. Arabesque in B♭ major
4. Arabesque in E major
- Etude in A♭ major for piano, Op. 5 (1881)
- Impromptu in D major for piano, Op. 6 (1881)
- Two Intermezzi for piano, Op. 7 (1881)
1. Intermezzo in D major
2. Intermezzo in F major
- Two Intermezzi for piano, Op. 8 (1883)
1. Intermezzo in B♭ major
2. Intermezzo in B♭ major
- Two Pieces for piano, Op. 9 (1883)
1. Valse in F♯ minor
2. Mazurka in A♭ major
- Three Pieces for piano, Op. 10 (1884)
1. Prelude in D♭ major
2. Mazurka in C major
3. Mazurka in D major
- Three Pieces for piano, Op. 11 (1885)
1. Prelude in B minor
2. Mazurka in the Dorian Mode
3. Mazurka in F♯ minor
- Etude in E major for piano, Op. 12 (1886)
- Four Preludes for piano, Op. 13 (1887)
1. Prelude in G major
2. Prelude in B♭ major
3. Prelude in A major
4. Prelude in F♯ minor
- Two Mazurkas for piano, Op. 15 (1887)
1. Mazurka in A major
2. Mazurka in A minor
- Scherzo in D major for orchestra, Op. 16 (1879–1886)
- Two Bagatelles for piano, Op. 17 (1887)
1. Bagatelle in B♭ minor (La Douleur)
2. Bagatelle in B major (Pastoral)
- Village Scene by the Inn, Mazurka for orchestra, Op. 19 (1887)
- Novellette in A minor for piano, Op. 20 (1882–1889)
- About Olden Times, Ballade in D major for piano, Op. 21a (1889)
- About Olden Times, Ballade in D major for orchestra, Op. 21b (1889)
- In the Clearing, Esquisse in F major for piano, Op. 23 (1890)
- Two Pieces for piano, Op. 24 (1890)
1. Prelude in E major
2. Berceuse in G♭ major
- Idylle in D♭ major for piano, Op. 25 (1891)
- Little Waltz in G major for piano, Op. 26 (1891)
- Three Preludes for piano, Op. 27 (1891)
1. Prelude in E♭ major
2. Prelude in B major
3. Prelude in G♭ major
- Final scene from Schiller's Die Braut von Messina for solo voices, chorus and orchestra, Op. 28 (1878, published 1891). This was his graduation piece.
- Kukolki (Marionettes) in E♭ major for piano, Op. 29 (1892)
- Bagatelle in D♭ major for piano, Op. 30 (1889)
- Two Pieces for piano, Op. 31 (1893)
1. 'Rustic' Mazurka in G major
2. Prelude in B♭ minor
- Muzikalnaya tabakerka (A musical snuffbox) in A major for piano, Op. 32 (1893)
- Three Pieces for piano, Op. 33 (1889)
1. Prelude on a Russian theme in A♭ major
2. Grotesque in C major
3. Pastoral in F major
- Three Canons for piano, Op. 34 (1894)
1. Canon in G major
2. Canon in C minor
3. Canon in F major
- Variations on a Theme by Glinka in B♭ major for piano, Op. 35 (1894)
- Three Preludes for piano, Op. 36 (1895)
1. Prelude in F♯ major
2. Prelude in B♭ minor
3. Prelude in G major
- Etude in F major for piano, Op. 37 (1895)
- Mazurka in F major for piano, Op. 38 (1895)
- Four Preludes for piano, Op. 39 (1895)
1. Prelude in A♭ major
2. Prelude in C minor
3. Prelude in B major
4. Prelude in F♯ minor
- Etude and Three Preludes for piano, Op. 40 (1897)
1. Etude in C♯ minor
2. Prelude in C major
3. Prelude in D minor
4. Prelude in D♭ major
- Two Fugues for piano, Op. 41 (1896)
1. Fugue in F♯ minor
2. Fugue in D minor
- Two Preludes and Mazurka for piano, Op. 42 (1898)
1. Prelude in B♭ major
2. Prelude in B major
3. Mazurka on Polish Themes in A major
- Barcarolle in F♯ major for piano, Op. 44 (1898)
- Four Preludes for piano, Op. 46 (1899)
1. Prelude in B♭ major
2. Prelude in G minor
3. Prelude in G major
4. Prelude in E minor
- Two Pieces for piano, Op. 48 (1899)
1. Etude in A major
2. Canzonetta in B♭ major
- Polonaise in C major ("In Memory of Pushkin") for orchestra, Op. 49 (1899)
- Variations on a Polish Folk Theme in A♭ major for piano, Op. 51 (1901)
- Three Ballet Pieces for piano, Op. 52 (1901)
1. in E♭ major
2. in C major
3. in A major
- Three Bagatelles for piano, Op. 53 (1903)
1. Bagatelle in B major
2. Bagatelle in G major
3. Bagatelle in A♭ major
- Polonaise in D major for orchestra, Op. 55 (1902)
- Baba Yaga for orchestra, Op. 56 (1891–1904)
- Three Pieces for piano, Op. 57 (1900–1905)
1. Prelude in D♭ major
2. Waltz in E major
3. Mazurka in F minor
- Eight Russian Folksongs for orchestra, Op. 58 (1906)
1. Religious Chant. Moderato
2. Christmas Carol 'Kolyada'. Allegretto
3. Plaintive Song. Andante
4. Humorous Song 'I Danced With The Gnat'. Allegretto
5. Legend of The Birds. Allegretto
6. Cradle Song. Moderato
7. Round Dance. Allegro
8. Village Dance Song. Vivo
- Ten Arrangements from Obikhod (a collection of old Russian Orthodox liturgical chants), Op. 61 (1909)
1. Stichira for the Nativity of Christ
2. Troparion for the Nativity of Christ "Rozdestvo Tvoe, Christe Bozhe nash"
3. Kondakion for the Nativity of Christ
4. Troparions "Blagoobrazny Iosiph (Prosperous Joseph)" and "Mironositsam zhenam (For myrrh-bearers wives)"
5. Chertog Tvoy vizhdu
6. Zadostoinik na Vozdvizhenie
7. Cherubical song
8. Tebe poem (To You we sing)
9. Khvalite Gospoda s nebes
10. Chashu spaseniya priimu
- Volshebnoye ozero (The Enchanted Lake) for orchestra, Op. 62 (1909)
- Kikimora for orchestra, Op. 63 (1909)
- Four Pieces for piano Op. 64 (1909–1910)
1. Grimace
2. Gloom
3. Temptation
4. Reminiscences
- Dance of the Amazon, for orchestra, Op. 65 (1910)
- From the Apocalypse, symphonic picture for orchestra, Op. 66 (1910–1912)
- Nénie for orchestra, Op. 67 (1914)

== Sources ==
- Sadie, Stanley, ed. (1980). The New Grove Dictionary of Music and Musicians. Macmillan Publishers Ltd., London. ISBN 1-56159-174-2.
- Brown, David, Tchaikovsky: The Final Years, 1885–1893, (New York: W.W. Norton & Company, 1991). ISBN 0-393-03099-7.
- Maes, Francis, tr. Arnold J. Pomerans and Erica Pomerans, A History of Russian Music: From Kamarinskaya to Babi Yar (Berkeley, Los Angeles and London: University of California Press, 2002). ISBN 0-520-21815-9.
- Rimsky-Korsakov, Nikolai, Letoppis Moyey Muzykalnoy Zhizni (St. Petersburg, 1909), published in English as My Musical Life (New York: Knopf, 1925, 3rd ed. 1942). ISBN n/a.
- Taruskin, Richard, Stravinsky and the Russian Traditions (Oxford: Oxford University Press, 1996). ISBN 0-19-816250-2.
- Volkov, Solomon, tr. Antonina W. Bouis, St. Petersburg: A Cultural History (New York: The Free Press, 1995). ISBN 0-02-874052-1.
