= The Enchanted Lake (Lyadov) =

1909 composition by Anatoly Lyadov

The Enchanted Lake, Op. 62, is a symphonic poem by Anatoly Lyadov, subtitled "fairy tale scene", dedicated to Nikolai Tcherepnin and premiered on 21 February 1909 in Saint Petersburg under the baton of the dedicatee. On the borders of symbolism and impressionism, The Enchanted Lake is a single work, not built on a musical theme. André Lischke said of it that "The whole bewitching effect is due to the texture of the instrumentation, to the harmonic metamorphoses, and to the figurations which translate the quivering of the water (divided strings) and the sparkling of the stars which are reflected there (flute, celesta), harp)".

The duration of the piece is approximately seven and a half minutes.

== Instrumentation ==
The Enchanted Lake is written for a symphonic orchestra with three flutes, two oboes, three clarinets, two bassoons, four horns, timpani, celesta, bass drum, harp and strings.
