= Irina Zhurina =

Russian operatic coloratura soprano (born 1946)

Irina Zhurina (Russian: Ирина Михайловна Журина; born 28 August 1946) is a Russian operatic coloratura soprano.

== Biography ==
Zhurina was born in Kharkov (Ukrainian Soviet Socialist Republic). After studying singing at the Kharkov Art Institute, she joined the Kharkov Opera in 1971, where she sang the leading roles in La Traviata, Lucia di Lammermoor, Rigoletto, etc.

Since 1975, she had been a soloist of the opera at the Bolshoi Theatre in Moscow. On this stage, she performed the leading opera parts composed for high soprano (lyrical coloratura soprano), such as Antonida (A Life for the Tsar), The Snow Maiden (Snegurochka), The Swan-Princess (The Tale of Tsar Saltan), Marfa (The Tsar's Bride), the Queen of Shemakha/Shemakhan Tsaritsa (The Golden Cockerel), Violetta (Verdi's La traviata) and Rosina (Il Barbiere di Siviglia).

She had taken part in the Bolshoi Opera tours in Italy (La Scala), Germany, Great Britain, France, Finland, the United States and Japan. At the 1988 Making Music Together festival in Boston (organised by Sarah Caldwell), Zhurina premiered Boris Tchaikovsky's Four Poems by Josef Brodsky for soprano and piano, and the following year gave their first performance in the Soviet Union.

Irina Zhurina still has a very active concert life, with a repertoire of opera arias, Russian art songs, baroque music and works by contemporary composers, devoted to (or specially composed for) her. She is also a teacher of singing on the faculty of the Academic Junior Music College of the Moscow Conservatory.

Zhurina has recorded a number of CDs both in Russia and in Germany.

== Recognitions and awards ==
Zhurina was made a People's Artist of Russia by President Boris Yeltsin in 1993.

== Recorded works ==
Zhurina's recorded works included a number of artists.

The first record called Judith (Serov), which was recorded in 1991, included Andrey Chistyakov (conductor), Bolshoi Theatre Orchestra, Russian Academic Choir of the USSR, Irina Udalova (Judith), YElena Zaremba (Avra), Mikhayil Krutikov (Holofernes), Nikolay Vasilyev (Bagoas), Anatoly Babïkhin (Ozias), Vladimir Kudryachov (Achior), Stanislav Suleimanov (Asfaneses), Pyotr Gluboky (Eliachim), Maksim Mikhaylov (Charmis), Irina Zhurina, Marina Shutova (Odalisques) and Lev Kuznetsov (Hindu Song).

Rimsky-Korsakov (Kashchey the Deathless), which was also recorded in 1991, included Andrey Chistyakov (conductor), Bolshoi Theatre Orchestra, Yurlov Academic Choir, Aleksandr Arkhipov (Kastchey), Irina Zhurina (Tsarevna), Nina Terentyeva (Kashcheyevna), Vladislav Verestnikov (Ivan Korolevich) and Vladimir Matorin (Storm-Bogatïr).

== See more ==
- Klimov, Pyotr Liner Notes: Boris Tchaikovsky – Song-Cycles and Chamber Music, Toccata Classics (TOCC0046), May 2009
- Kotliarskaia, Elena Moiseevna, Women in Society: Russia, Marshall Cavendish, 1994, p. 62. ISBN 1-85435-561-9
- Pugliaro, G., Opera '90. Annuario dell'opera lirica in Italia , EDT srl, 1990, p. 122. ISBN 88-7063-088-9
