= Mikhail Sariotti =

Russian opera singer

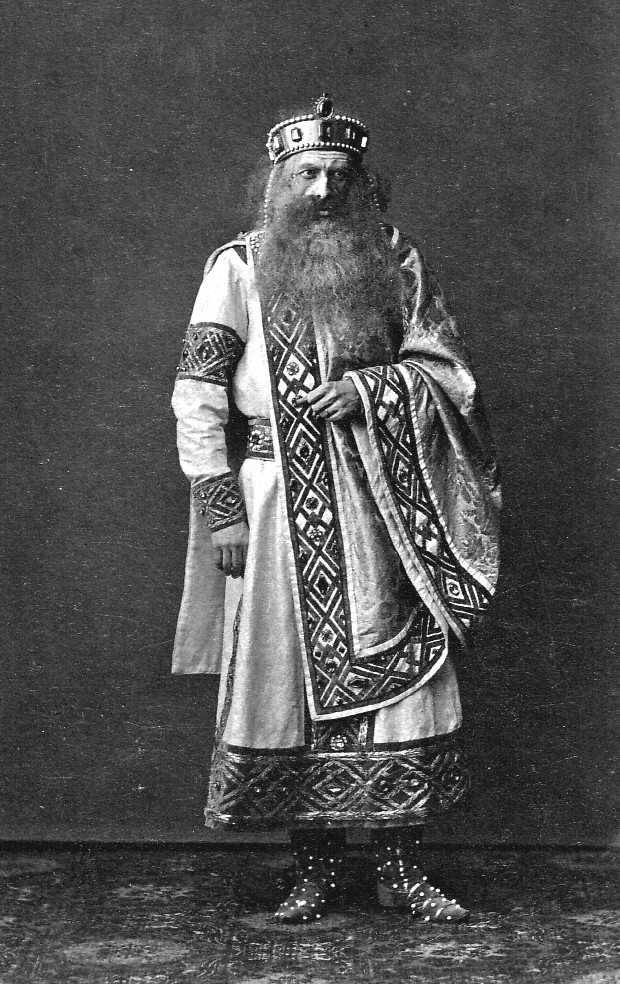
Mikhail Sariotti as Vladimir Krasnoye Solnyshko in Rogneda, Mariinsky Theater, 1865

Mikhail Sariotti (Russian: Михаил Иванович (or Яковлевич)) Сариотти; 1839 (or 1830, or 1831), near of Vyborg (near Saint Petersburg) – 30 January (11 February) 1878, in Saint Petersburg) was a Russian opera singer (bass-baritone) and music critic.

He was a member of the Saint Petersburg Imperial troupe.

== Childhood ==
He was an illegitimate son of an influential family and he was given for adoption. When he grew up he went to Saint Petersburg to study medicine.

== Music career ==
However, his love of music and ability changed his initial plans. In 1859, he began taking singing lessons with the singer Pietr Ivanovich Gumbin. A few months later, he went to Milan to study with the famous teacher Pietro Repetto. In Milan, he began his singing career and achieved significant success. He changed his name to Sariotti.

Mikhail Sariotti returned to Russia in 1863 as an experienced singer and was admitted to the St. Petersburg Imperial troupe of Opera soloists.

He soon married dramatic actress of Petersburg Imperial troupe Valentina Lyadova, sister of composer Anatoly Lyadov.

He became one of the most outstanding Russian Opera singers of the 1860 - 1870s. Music critic and composer Alexander Serov dedicated to Sariotti creativity several articles and called him not only a great Opera singer, but also a great actor. Mikhail Sariotti became the first performer in operas of Alexander Serov: Olofern – opera Judith, 1863; Vladimir Krasnoye Solnyshko – opera Rogneda, 1865; Yeryomka – opera The Power of the Fiend, 1871.

Mikhail Sariotti worked as a vocalist on the stage and simultaneously he did a lot of musicological work. He wrote many articles about Opera performances. He wrote an important article about the opera Boris Godunov in 1874 (he played himself Police Officer Nikitich). He wrote articles about the works of different composers and singers: Richard Wagner, Angelo Masini, César Cui, Modest Mussorgsky etc. Mikhail Sariotti headed in the 1870s the Music department of the magazine Vsemirnaya Illyustratsiya.

He served in the Saint Petersburg Imperial troupe until his death in 1878.
