= The Power of the Fiend =

- Opera by Alexander Serov
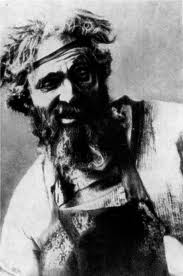
- Feodor Chaliapin as Yeryomka
- Native title: Russian: Вражья сила
- Librettist: Alexander Ostrovsky; Pyotr Ivanovich Kalashnikov; Alexander Fyodorovich Zhokhov
- Language: Russian
- Based on: Ostrovsky's Live Not as You Would Like To
- Premiere: 14 April 1871; Mariinsky Theatre, Saint Petersburg

The Power of the Fiend (Russian: Вражья сила, Vrazhya sila) is an opera in five acts by Alexander Serov, composed during 1867-1871. The libretto is derived from a drama by Alexander Ostrovsky from 1854 entitled Live Not As You Would Like To, But As God Commands. The opera was premiered posthumously on 19 April 1871 (Old Style) at the Mariinsky Theatre in Saint Petersburg conducted by Eduard Nápravník. Among the performers were Darya Leonova as Spiridonovna and Mikhail Sariotti as Yeryomka. Although in many ways it is more far-reaching than Serov's previous two operas, this work was not a success.

The title of the opera (taken from an appellation that Ostrovsky had applied to the fourth act of the projected libretto) has been translated in a number of ways: The Hostile Power, The Fiendish Power, The Malevolent Power, The Power of Evil, and so on. As an obsolete Russian phrase, it can mean simply "Satan" or "The Devil" (indeed, the Mariinsky Theatre renders the title of the opera in English as Satan). Part of the variety in translation derives from interpreting the initial word of the title. Вражий in Russian is an adjective from the noun враг ("foe" or "enemy"; obsoletely "the Fiend" or "the Devil"). In the case of this drama the title relates to the character Yeryomka.

== Composition history ==
Although Ostrovsky originally agreed to act as librettist and proceeded to versify his prose play through the first three acts of the opera text, he declined to when the composer insisted on changing the happy ending of the play into a tragic one. Therefore, the remainder of the libretto was prepared by Pyotr Ivanovich Kalashnikov and Alexander Fyodorovich Zhokhov. If not for the delay caused by the rift with Ostrovsky, Serov might have completed the opera, but unfortunately the music of the final act was lacking at the time of his death. His wife, Valentina Serova, composed Act 5 supposedly using her recollections of unwritten sketches that Serov had played at the piano, and the composer Nikolai Solovyov assisted in bringing the opera to a performable state by orchestrating some of the music for Act 1.

Despite a new edition of the opera completed by Boris Asafiev for a Soviet performance in 1947, The Power of the Fiend still remains well outside of the repertory.

== Roles ==
(Note: Due to gaps in information from one source to another, this section combines data from the play, the available piano-vocal score, and Bernandt, all cited in the bibliography below.)

- Il'ya, a rich Moscow merchant who lives at his brother's monastery: basso
- Pyotr, Il'ya's son, [a young merchant]: baritone
- Dasha (Dar'ya), Pyotr's wife: soprano
- Julia Petrova, Pyotr’s mistress: basso
- Agafon, Dasha's father, suburbanite from Vladimir: tenor
- Stepanida: Dasha's mother, suburbanite from Vladimir: mezzo-soprano
- Afim'ya, Pyotr's aunt: mezzo-soprano
- Spiridonovna, proprietress of a coaching inn: mezzo-soprano
- Grunya, her daughter: mezzo-soprano
- Vasya, young son of a merchant: tenor
- Yeryomka, a blacksmith working at the inn: bass
- A Travelling Merchant: bass
- 2nd Merchant: tenor
- A Coachman: tenor
- A Bear-Trainer: tenor
- An Archer Woman: soprano
- An Archer
- Honey-and-Spice-Drink Seller
- Bread-Roll Seller
- Spice-Cake Seller: tenor
- Pancake Seller
- A Peasant
- 2 Revellers: tenors
- Offstage revelers; merchants, transients, coachmen, maiden-guests at Grunya's, crowd of carousing people, fife-players and bagpipers, maskers in the procession for the "sending off of Shrovetide", lads, peasants and their wives, women, men, a bear.

== Synopsis ==
Time: The 17th or 18th century, at Shrovetide.
Place: Moscow

=== Act 1 ===
Dasha is saddened that her husband, Pyotr, is almost completely absent nowadays. His father, Il'ya, disgusted by Pyotr's sinful treatment of his family, prepares to move away. When Pyotr enters, he evades his father's questions of his whereabouts. After Il'ya goes off to attend vespers, Dasha tries to win back Pyotr's love, but he rejects her (he has become attracted to Grunya, the innkeeper's daughter) and leaves once again. Vasya—whom Dasha had once loved before marrying Pyotr—shows up to wish her a happy holiday. Taking advantage of his Shrovetide-induced, somewhat inebriated condition, Dasha learns from him about Pyotr's secret infatuation. She decides to move away from Moscow to live with her parents.

=== Act 2 ===
At Spiridonovna's busy inn, Yeryomka, and then Grunya, each sing a song for the visiting merchants and coachmen. As the others depart, Spiridonovna, desiring that her daughter marry someone well-off, urges Grunya to use her wiles on Pyotr the next time he comes in. When he does, she caresses him and manages to set up a date with him to go sleigh-riding that evening. He leaves, and Grunya overhears some people she does not know: Dasha's parents enter the inn, having come to Moscow to visit; Dasha, unexpectedly meeting them there, tells them of her decision. But her father forbids her to leave her husband and move in with them. From this conversation Grunya realizes that Pyotr has deceived her concerning his marital status.

=== Act 3 ===
Waiting to meet Pyotr at the inn, Grunya bemoans her fate. Upon arriving, Pyotr reads her change of mood as she spurns him, and guesses that only Vasya could have clued her in. When she goes off with Vasya, Yeryomka suggests to Pyotr that a visit to a witch-friend of his will solve his problems. Pyotr agrees to see her.

=== Act 4 ===
Out in the streets, Shrovetide merry-making is in full swing, with singing of songs and selling of food. Pyotr, drunk and brooding, comes upon the scene with Yeryomka. (The witch has told Pyotr that his future portends a wedding, hence his concern with being married still to Dasha.) When Vasya shows up with Grunya, Pyotr tries to kill him, but merely humiliates himself. After more Shrovetide revelers draw the crowd away, Pyotr comes once again under Yeryomka's influence: the latter proposes a plan: Dasha will be told that Pyotr has become ill out at the "wolf's gully." This conversation is overheard by Vasya, who runs off to warn her.

=== Act 5 ===
Out in the ravine, near a weakly lighted hut, amidst noises of a nocturnal snowstorm, Pyotr imagines voices of the previous few hours. Yeryomka enters, with Dasha, who has fallen for the ruse. When Pyotr rushes at Dasha with a knife, she runs into the hut; he follows her into it and kills her. The sound of approaching sleighbells frightens Yeryomka away: Vasya could not find Dasha to warn her, and so he, along with Il'ya and her parents, have driven to the site of the planned murder, only to come upon Pyotr, who is condemned by his father. (Note: in the original play, Pyotr gives up the idea of murder and reconciles his marriage.)

== See also ==
- Judith (1863)
- Rogneda (1865)
