= Little Tragedies =

Little Tragedies may refer to:

- Little Tragedies (Pushkin), four short plays by Alexander Pushkin (1830)
- Little Tragedies (film), a 1979 Soviet television miniseries adaptation of Pushkin's works
- Little Tragedies (rock group), a Russian band
