= Sveshnikov State Academic Russian Choir =

Russian choir founded in 1936

The A. V. Sveshnikov State Academic Russian Choir is one of the principal choirs of Russia, founded in 1936 by Aleksandr Sveshnikov as the choir of the USSR All-Union Radio with Sveshnikov as permanent director from 1941. The choir was renamed in his honour after his death.

== Conductors ==
- Nikolai Danilin (1936-1939)
- Vladimir Vinogradov (1939 - 1941)
- Aleksandr Sveshnikov (1941-1980)
- Igor Agafonnikov (1980–1987)
- Vladimir Minin (1987–1990)
- Evgeniy Tytyanko (1991-1995)
- Igor Raevskiy (1995-2007)
- Boris Tevlin (2008-2012)
- Evgeny Volkov (2012-)

== Selected recordings ==
- Rachmaninov All night vigil 1965
- Russian Folk Songs
