= Rogneda (opera) =

- Opera by Alexander Serov
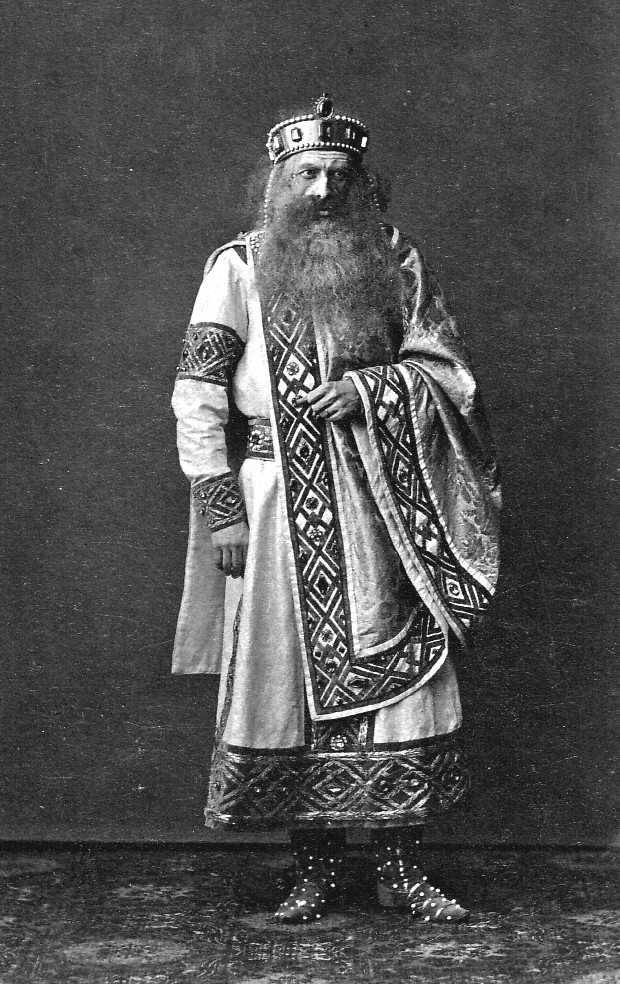
- Mikhail Sariotti as priest in the premiere
- Native title: Russian: Рогнеда
- Librettist: Dmitry Averkiev
- Language: Russian
- Based on: Mikhail Zagoskin's Askold's Grave
- Premiere: 27 October 1865; Mariinsky Theatre, Saint Petersburg

Rogneda (Russian: Рогнеда) is an opera in five acts, composed by Alexander Serov between 1863 and 1865. The scenario, by the composer, was based on the novel Askold's Grave (Аскольдова могила, 1833) by Mikhail Zagoskin and the poem Rogneda (ca. 1825) by Kondraty Ryleyev. The actual Russian libretto was created by Dmitry Averkiev in the same manner as with the composer's previous opera, Judith, with the words written to fit the vocal lines after the music had been composed.

This opera forms a sequel of sorts to Alexey Verstovsky's highly successful singspiel, Askold's Grave, which premiered in 1835, just the year before Glinka's A Life for the Tsar reached the stage. No less a patriotic opera than those two, Rogneda in its plot combines elements of the life of the title character with the Christianization of Russia, dated in 988 with the conversion of Vladimir I of Kiev. With its huge cast and sprawling plot, the opera demands spectacle of a Meyerbeerian order.

== Performance history ==
The premiere performance took place on 27 October 1865 at the Mariinsky Theatre in Saint Petersburg, conducted by Konstantin Lyadov (the singer Osip A. Petrov as Vladimir Krasnoye Solnyshko), while the Moscow premiere took place during the following year at the Bolshoy Theatre in Moscow conducted by Shramek.

The premiere of the opera proved to be a resounding hit, and the work remained extremely popular through the end of the Russian Empire.

== Roles ==
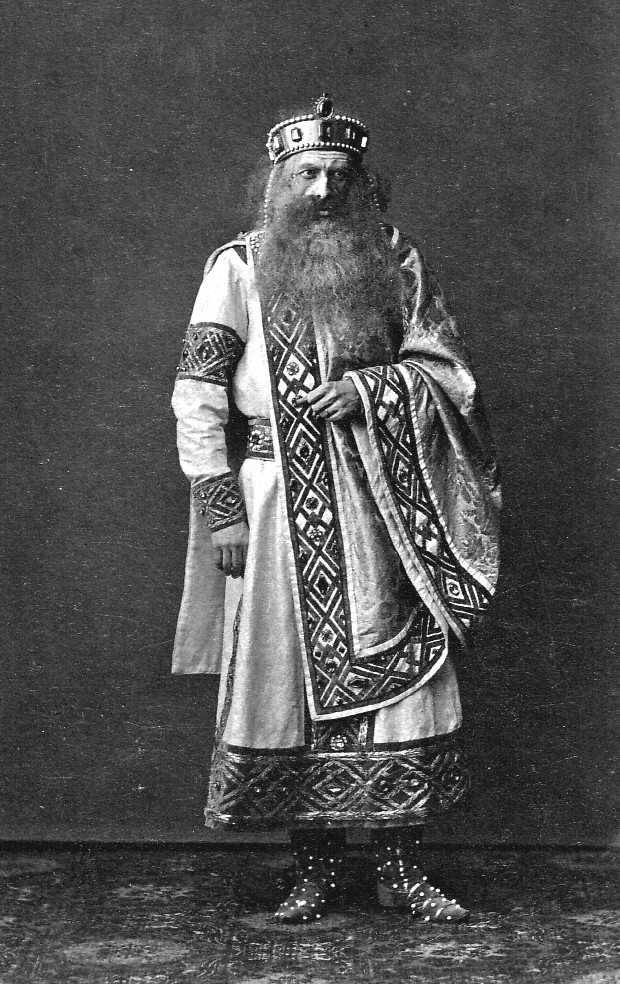
Mikhail Sariotti as Vladimir, 1865

- (Vladimir) Krasnoye Solnyshko [i.e., Bright Sun], prince of the capital Kiev: baritone
- Rogneda, one of his wives: mezzo-soprano
- Izyaslav, her 13-year-old son: contralto
- Dobrynya Nikitich, the prince's uncle: bass
- Rual'd, a young Varangian, a Christian: tenor
- Ingerd: tenor
- Drulav: bass
- Old Man Wanderer: bass
- Supreme Priest of Perun: bass
- The Prince's Jester, a merry skomorokh: tenor
- Skul'da, a Varangian witch: mezzo-soprano
- Mal'frida, one of Rogneda's slaves: soprano
- Izyaslav's Nurse: soprano
- Master of Hounds: baritone
- 1st Hunter: tenor
- 2nd Hunter: bass
- Bogatyrs; members of the prince's armed forces; city elders; guests at table; cupbearers; huntsmen; falconers; huntsmen in charge of hounds; hunters on horse and on foot; priests of Perun and immolators of sacrifices; wanderer-pilgrims; women at the feast; female slaves of Rogneda; skomorokhi; male and female dancers; warriors; captive Pechenegs, Varangians; people.

== Synopsis ==
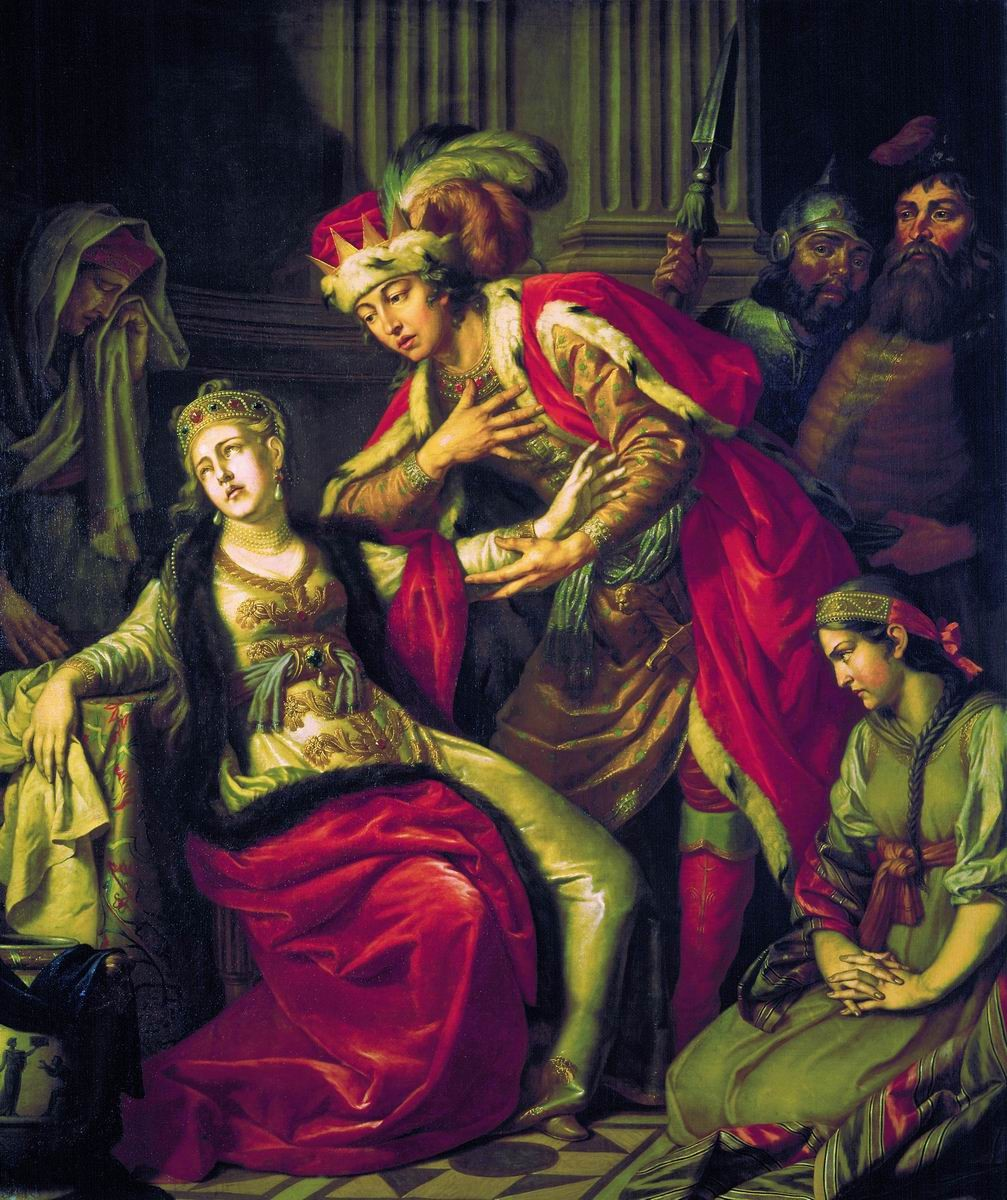
Vladimir and Rogneda by Anton Losenko (1770).

Time: The end of the 10th century
Place: In and around Kiev

Note: Acts 1 and 5 may contain more than one set of stage decor

=== Act 1 ===
Inside Skul'da's cave, the Supreme Priest of Perun, concerned about Prince Vladimir's failure to protect the native religion from encroaching Christianity, has decided that Rogneda—upon Skul'da's influence—must kill him. Rogneda enters, already prepared to avenge her father's death at Vladimir's hands. Skul'da's sorcery produces a knife with which Rogneda can perform the deed. The scene changes to a public rite of human sacrifice to the god Perun. When Rual'd, a Christian, prevents the priest from killing the first victim, he is at first threatened with death by the priests; but, after the Supreme Priest finds out that Rual'd, too, has a grievance with Vladimir, Rual'd is spared. (Vladimir kidnapped Rual'd's bride, Olava.)

=== Act 2 ===
At a banquet there is celebration with Vladimir, who has returned from his successful campaign. News arrives of a failed attempt by Rual'd to rescue Olava, and Vladimir commands that Rual'd be apprehended and killed. When Dobrynya Nikitich defends Rual'd's honorable devotion to his bride, Vladimir at first threatens Dobrynya with banishment, but the court jester manages to calm the situation.

=== Act 3 ===
In a forest, Rual'd comes upon some itinerant Christians. An Old Man dissuades him from taking revenge on the Prince—who, by chance, comes on the scene with his retinue on a hunting expedition from Kiev. When Vladimir is attacked by a bear, Rual'd saves his life at the expense of his own. This sacrifice, as well as the words of the Old Man—which mention a miracle of salvation during the coming night—makes a deep impression on the Prince. Due to the late hour, Vladimir decides to stay with Rogneda, whose abode stands nearby.

=== Act 4 ===
In her tower, Rogneda is disconsolate until she hears that Vladimir is arriving. After he settles in, the Prince dismisses his retinue and falls asleep. Rogneda, knife in hand, approaches him, but Vladimir suddenly awakens (he has had a dream of danger) and stops her, threatening with execution the next day.

=== Act 5 ===
Back at Skul'da's cave, the Supreme Priest in distress consults the sorceress again. Skul'da shows him a vision in which Vladimir commands the people to drown the idol of Perun into the river. Meanwhile, in Rogneda's tower, Izyaslav (Vladimir and Rogneda's young son) intercedes for his mother, causing the Prince to leave his wife's fate in the hands of the people. Called to a veche, the people demand Rogneda's death. Izyaslav's further entreaties persuade Vladimir to forgive Rogneda, whereupon the wandering Christians appear and thank God for Vladimir's conversion.

== Publication history ==
- 1866, Piano-vocal score, Stellovsky, St. Petersburg

== Important excerpts ==
- Varangian Ballad (Act 4): the basis for the Viking song in Sadko (opera)

== Recordings ==
- Sofia Kiseleva (mezzo-soprano) extracts

== See also ==
- Judith (1863)
- The Power of the Fiend (1871)
