= Piano–vocal score =

Music score of an opera

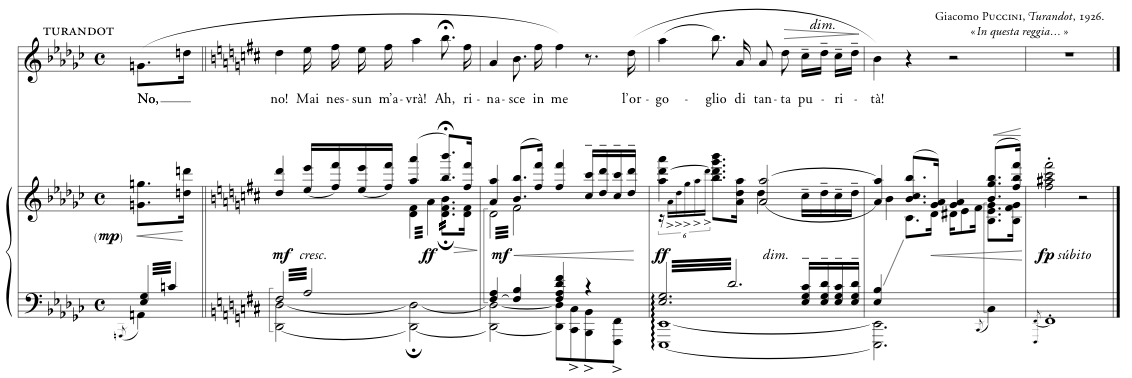
Example of a vocal score (Giacomo Puccini's Turandot).

A vocal score or piano–vocal score is a music score of an opera, or a vocal or choral composition written for orchestral accompaniment, such as an oratorio or cantata. In a piano–vocal score, the vocal parts are written out in full, but the accompaniment is reduced and adapted for keyboard (usually piano). The music is usually reduced to two staves; however, more staves, a second keyboardist (piano four hands), or a second keyboard part can be added, as needed.

There are two main types of piano–vocal scores. The first kind consists of those scores created by a composer in the process of composing, usually as a harmonic map or "sketch" of the piece to be later orchestrated. The second category includes scores that are arrangements or transcriptions made after the completion of the work, usually by someone other than the composer.

Piano–vocal scores are generally created to enable a conductor or choir leader to rehearse the singers with a piano accompanist before the choir begins rehearsals with the orchestra. The cost of rehearsing with a professional orchestra is so high that choirs typically hold a number of rehearsals with piano accompaniment to prepare the choir, as the cost of hiring a single piano accompanist is much lower than hiring 50–100 orchestral musicians.

Piano–vocal scores are also used by music students, singers and conductors to study the compositional structure of the score. Before the widespread availability of sound recordings, piano–vocal scores were also sold for amateur home performance or small-scale professional performance of the piece, where a full orchestra would not be feasible from an economic or performance space perspective.

== Piano-conductor scores ==
While piano-vocal scores tend to consist of the vocal lines and a piano reduction of the whole orchestra onto two staves, piano-conductor scores tend to consist of the vocal lines and one of the orchestral piano parts that already exists, coupled with another staff containing the rest of the orchestral reduction (in contrast to a piano-vocal score, where the piano and other orchestral parts cannot be easily separated at sight). In a piano-conductor score, orchestral part entries are usually visibly tagged in the third staff.

While piano-vocal scores provide a full accompaniment for rehearsals, reduced performances, etc., piano-conductor scores give the conductor a more direct view of the activity of the orchestra, without being as complex as a full orchestral score. This is especially relevant when the conductor is conducting not from the podium, but from the piano while playing the indicated piano part (often seen in musical theatre orchestras).

== See also ==
- Piano reduction
