= V. Bessel and Co. =

V. Bessel and Co. was a musical firm founded in 1869 in St Petersburg by Vasily Vasil’yevich Bessel (1843–1907). His brother N. V. Bessel was a co-owner of the firm.

The firm published and, from 1871 printed, works by prominent Russian composers, notably Pyotr Tchaikovsky, Anton Rubinstein, Alexander Dargomyzhsky and the members of the New Russian Musical School — Modest Musorgsky, Nikolay Rimsky-Korsakov, César Cui, Mily Balakirev, and Alexander Borodin.

The firm issued a weekly magazine "Muzykal’ny listok" [The Musical Leaf] from September 3, 1872 to June 5, 1877, and the weekly "Muzykal’noye obozrenie" [The musical revue] from 1885 to 1888.

Bessel's sons, Vasily and Aleksandr, moved the firm from St Petersburg to Paris in 1920 after the Russian Revolution of 1917.
