= Alexander Serov =

Russian composer and music critic (1820–1871)

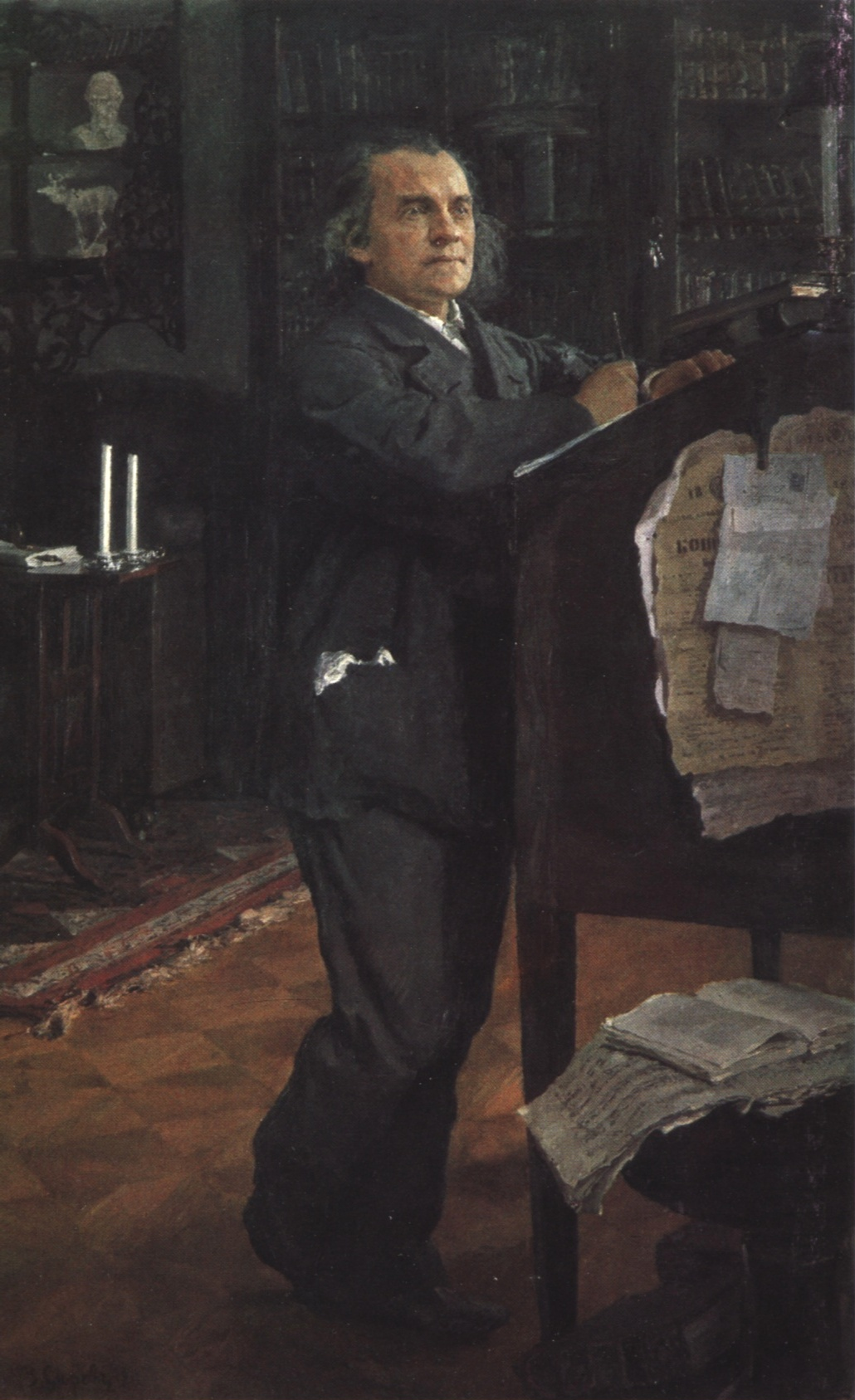
Composer Alexander Serov, the posthumous portrait by Valentin Serov, 1887–1888, the Russian Museum, Saint Petersburg

Alexander Nikolayevich Serov (Russian: Алекса́ндр Никола́евич Серо́в, 23 January [O.S. 11 January] 1820 – 1 February [O.S. 20 January] 1871) was a Russian composer and music critic. He is notable as one of the most important music critics in Russia during the 1850s and 1860s and as the most significant Russian composer in the period between Dargomyzhsky's Rusalka and the works of Rimsky-Korsakov, Mussorgsky, and Tchaikovsky.

Alexander Serov was the father of Russian artist Valentin Serov.

== Biography ==
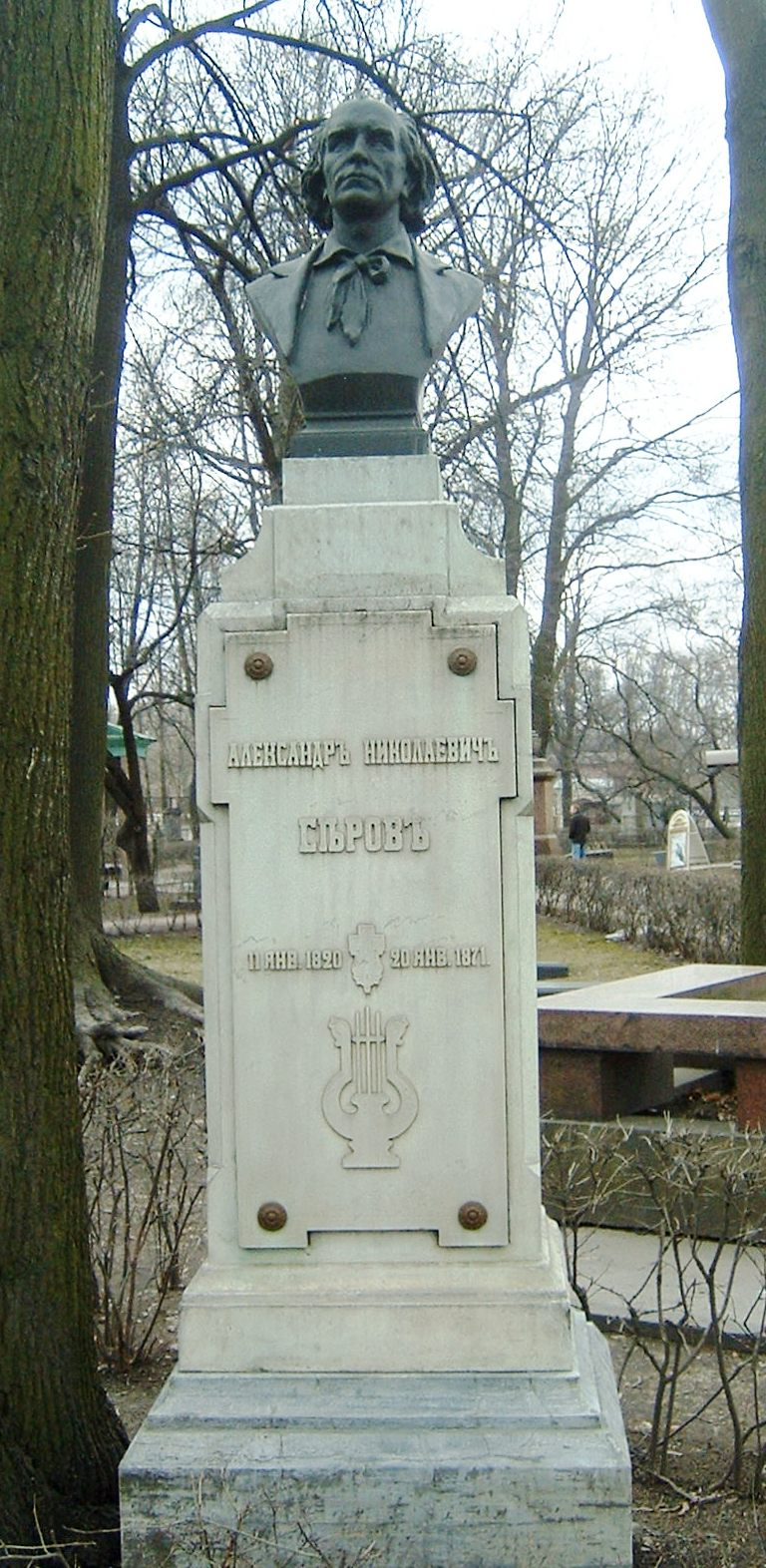
Grave of Alexander Serov in Tikhvin Cemetery in Saint Petersburg.

Alexander Serov was born in St. Petersburg on 11 January 1820, the son of Nikolai Ivanovich Serov, a Finance Ministry official. Serov's maternal grandfather, Carl Ludwig Hablitz, was a naturalist of German-Jewish origin who was born in Königsberg and moved to Russia in childhood when his father was hired to be inspector of Moscow University's printing department. In Russia, Hablitz became a member of the Russian Academy of Sciences among other high official posts. Serov's father Nikolai wanted him to become a lawyer as well and enrolled him in the inaugural class of the Imperial School of Jurisprudence. Serov was more interested in music, however, and became a friend of another law school student, Vladimir Stasov, who eventually became a famous art critic.

Serov completed his studies in 1840 and started working as a lawyer in the government bureaucracy in St. Petersburg as well as in Pskov and in Simferopol, capital of Crimea. Eventually, his interest in music prevailed, and in 1850 he quit his job and began to compose music and to write music journalism. He also gave music lectures, though neither activity provided well for him financially. In 1863 Alexander Serov married his student Valentina Serova (born Bergman), who also went on to become a composer. In 1865 a son, Valentin Serov (19 January 1865 – 5 December 1911), was born to them. He became a distinguished painter, and one of the premier Russian portrait artists of his era. Among his notable paintings were Girl with Peaches (1887), and The Girl Covered by the Sun (1888), both in the Tretyakov Gallery, and many portraits of famous people.

In 1871, Alexander Serov unexpectedly died of a heart attack. His widow finished his last opera and promoted his legacy.

As a composer, Serov is notable for composing operas. His first opera, Judith, was first performed in 1863. Although Serov's operas Judith and Rogneda were quite successful at the time, none of his operas is performed today, though excerpts have occasionally appeared in concert performances. A CD recording of Judith (with some cuts) was made in 1991 by the orchestra and choir of the Bolshoi Theatre under conductor Andrey Chistiakov. Rogneda and The Power of the Fiend were recorded in shortened versions in the 1940s.

Whereas Serov was an acclaimed critic and composer, his relations with fellow intellectuals were sometimes far from ideal. For example, he and Stasov became enemies over the relative values of Glinka's two operas. Serov's admiration for Richard Wagner likewise did not endear him to The Mighty Handful, then a rising group of Russian composers, mainly due to efforts of the younger competing critic César Cui, who, like Stasov, had been on better terms with Serov earlier.

== Operas ==
- Judith (Юдифь, 1861–63)
- Rogneda (Рогнеда, 1863–65)
- The Power of the Fiend (Вражья сила, 1867–71)
