= Alexander Dargomyzhsky =

Russian composer (1813–1869)

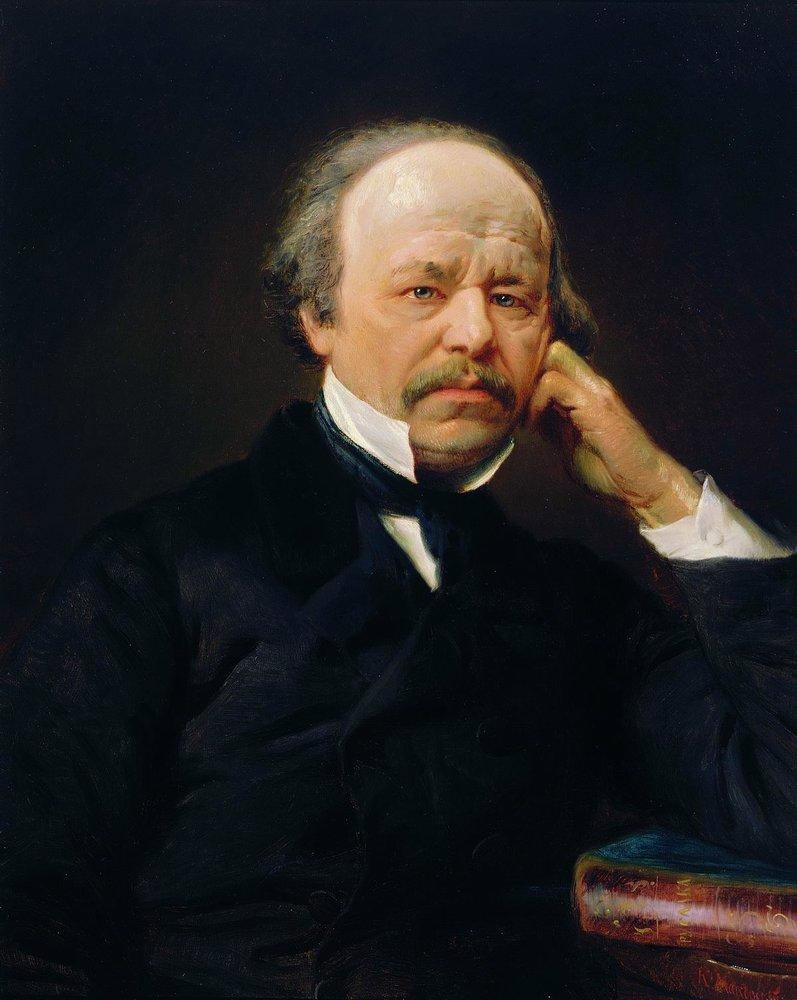
Alexander Dargomyzhsky (Portrait by Konstantin Makovsky, 1869)

Alexander Sergeyevich Dargomyzhsky (Note: Russian: Александр Сергеевич Даргомыжский, romanized: Aleksandr Sergeyevich Dargomyzhskiy, IPA: [ɐlʲɪkˈsandr sʲɪrˈɡʲe(j)ɪvʲɪdʑ dərɡɐˈmɨʂskʲɪj]) (Note: BGN/PCGN is used here. ALA-LC: Aleksandr Sergeevich Dargomyzhskiĭ; ISO 9: Aleksandr Sergeevič Dargomyžskij.) (14 February [O.S. 2 February] 1813 – 17 January [O.S. 5 January] 1869) was a 19th-century Russian composer. He bridged the gap in Russian opera composition between Mikhail Glinka and the later generation of The Five and Pyotr Ilyich Tchaikovsky.

== Biography ==
Dargomyzhsky was born in the village of Troitskoye, Belyov uyezd, Tula Governorate (now Arsenyevsky District, Tula Oblast), and educated in Saint Petersburg. He was already known as a talented musical amateur when, in 1833, he met Mikhail Glinka and was encouraged to devote himself to composition. His opera Esmeralda (with a libretto by the composer, based on Victor Hugo's The Hunchback of Notre-Dame) was composed in 1839 (though not performed until 1847), and his Rusalka was performed in 1856; but he had little success or recognition either at home or abroad, except in Belgium, until the 1860s, when he became the elder statesman, but not a member, of The Five.

His last opera, The Stone Guest, is his most famous work, known as a pioneering effort in melodic recitative. With the orchestration and the end of the first scene left incomplete at his death, it was finished by César Cui and Nikolai Rimsky-Korsakov, and was much prized by The Five for what was perceived as its progressive approach to operatic expression. It was premiered in 1872, but never became a lasting standard operatic repertoire item.

Dargomyzhsky also left some unfinished opera projects, among them an attempted setting of Pushkin's Poltava, from which a duet survives. Besides operas, his other compositions include numerous songs, piano pieces, and some orchestral works.

He died in Saint Petersburg in 1869, aged 55.

== Compositions ==
=== Opera ===
- Esmeralda. An opera in four acts, with a libretto by the composer based on Victor Hugo's novel *The Hunchback of Notre-Dame* (*Notre-Dame de Paris*). Composed between 1838 and 1841. First performed at the Bolshoi Theatre, Moscow, on December 5 (17), 1847.
- The Triumph of Bacchus (*Торжество Вакха*). An opera-ballet based on the poem of the same name by Pushkin. Composed between 1843 and 1848. First performed at the Bolshoi Theatre, Moscow, on January 11 (23), 1867.
- Rusalka. An opera in four acts, with a libretto by the composer based on Pushkin’s unfinished play of the same name. Composed between 1848 and 1855. First performed in Saint Petersburg on May 4 (16), 1856.
- Mazeppa. Sketches, 1860.
- Rogdana. Fragments, 1860–1867.
- The Stone Guest (*Каменный гость»*). An opera in three acts, set to the text of Pushkin’s "Little Tragedy" of the same name. Composed between 1866 and 1869; completed by C. A. Cui and orchestrated by N. A. Rimsky-Korsakov. First performed at the Mariinsky Theatre, Saint Petersburg, on February 16 (28), 1872.

=== Works for Orchestra ===
- "Bolero." Late 1830s.
- "Baba Yaga" ("From the Volga to Riga"). Completed in 1862; first performed in 1870.
- "Little Russian Cossack Dance" (*Malorossiysky Kazachok*). A fantasy. 1864.
- "Chukhonskaya Fantasy" (Finnish Fantasy). Written between 1863 and 1867; first performed in 1869.

=== Chamber vocal works ===
- Songs and romances for two voices and piano, set to poems by Russian and foreign authors—including "Petersburg Serenades"—as well as excerpts from the unfinished operas *Mazepa* and *Rogdana*.
- Songs and romances for solo voice and piano, set to poems by Russian and foreign authors, including: "The Old Corporal" (lyrics by Béranger, translated by V. Kurochkin), "The Paladin" (lyrics by L. Uhland, translated by V. Zhukovsky), "The Worm" (lyrics by Béranger, translated by V. Kurochkin), "The Titular Councilor" (lyrics by P. Weinberg), "I Loved You..." (lyrics by A. S. Pushkin), "I Feel Sad" (lyrics by M. Y. Lermontov), and "I Have Turned Sixteen" (lyrics by A. Delvig), among others—with texts by Koltsov, Kurochkin, Pushkin, Lermontov, and other poets—including two interpolated romances for the character Laura from the opera *The Stone Guest*.

=== Works for piano ===
- Five plays (1820s): March, Contredanse, Melancholy Waltz, Waltz, Cossack.
- "Brilliant Waltz." Around 1830.
- Variations on a Russian theme. Early 1830's.
- "Esmeralda's Dreams." Fantasy. 1838.
- Two mazurkas. The end of the 1830's.
- Polka. 1844.
- Scherzo. 1844.
- "Snuffbox Waltz". 1845.
- "Ardour and composure." Scherzo. 1847.
- Song without Words (1851)
- Fantasy on the topics from Glinka's opera "Life for the Tsar" (mid-1850s)
- Slavic Tarantella (for four hands, 1865)
- Translations of symphonic fragments of the opera "Esmeralda" and others.

== Bibliography ==
- Richard Taruskin, Opera and Drama in Russia As Preached and Practiced in the 1860s. New ed. Rochester: University of Rochester Press, 1993.
- Cui, La musique en Russie (Paris, 1880)
- Pougin, Essai historique sur la musique en Russie (Turin, 1897)
- Fétis, Biographie universelle des musiciens (Paris, 1862)
