= Mussorgsky (disambiguation) =

Modest Mussorgsky (1839–1881) was a Russian composer.

Mussorgsky may also refer to:

- The Mussorgsky family of Russian nobility
- Mussorgsky (film), a 1950 Soviet film about the composer

== Mussorgskij ==
- Mussorgskij (crater), crater on Mercury
