= Kromy =

Set index of articles associated with the same name

Kromy (Russian: Кромы) is the name of several inhabited localities in Russia.

Urban localities

- Kromy, Oryol Oblast, an urban-type settlement in Kromskoy District of Oryol Oblast

Rural localities

- Kromy, Ivanovo Oblast, a selo in Verkhnelandekhovsky District of Ivanovo Oblast
- Kromy, Novgorod Oblast, a village in Moykinskoye Settlement of Batetsky District of Novgorod Oblast
- Kromy, Omsk Oblast, a selo in Kaskatsky Rural Okrug of Isilkulsky District of Omsk Oblast
