= Kromy, Ivanovo Oblast =

Kromy Кромы
- Selo
- Location within Ivanovo Oblast Location within Russia
- Coordinates: 56°52′N 42°30′E
- Country: Russia
- Region: Ivanovo Oblast
- District: Verkhnelandekhovsky District
- Time zone: UTC+3:00

Kromy (Russian: Кромы) is a rural locality (a selo) in Verkhnelandekhovsky District, Ivanovo Oblast, Russia. Population: 200 (2010 census);

== Geography ==
This rural locality is located 7 km from Verkhny Landekh (the district's administrative centre), 95 km from Ivanovo (capital of Ivanovo Oblast) and 323 km from Moscow. Makunino is the nearest rural locality.
