= Mussorgskij (crater) =

Crater on Mercury

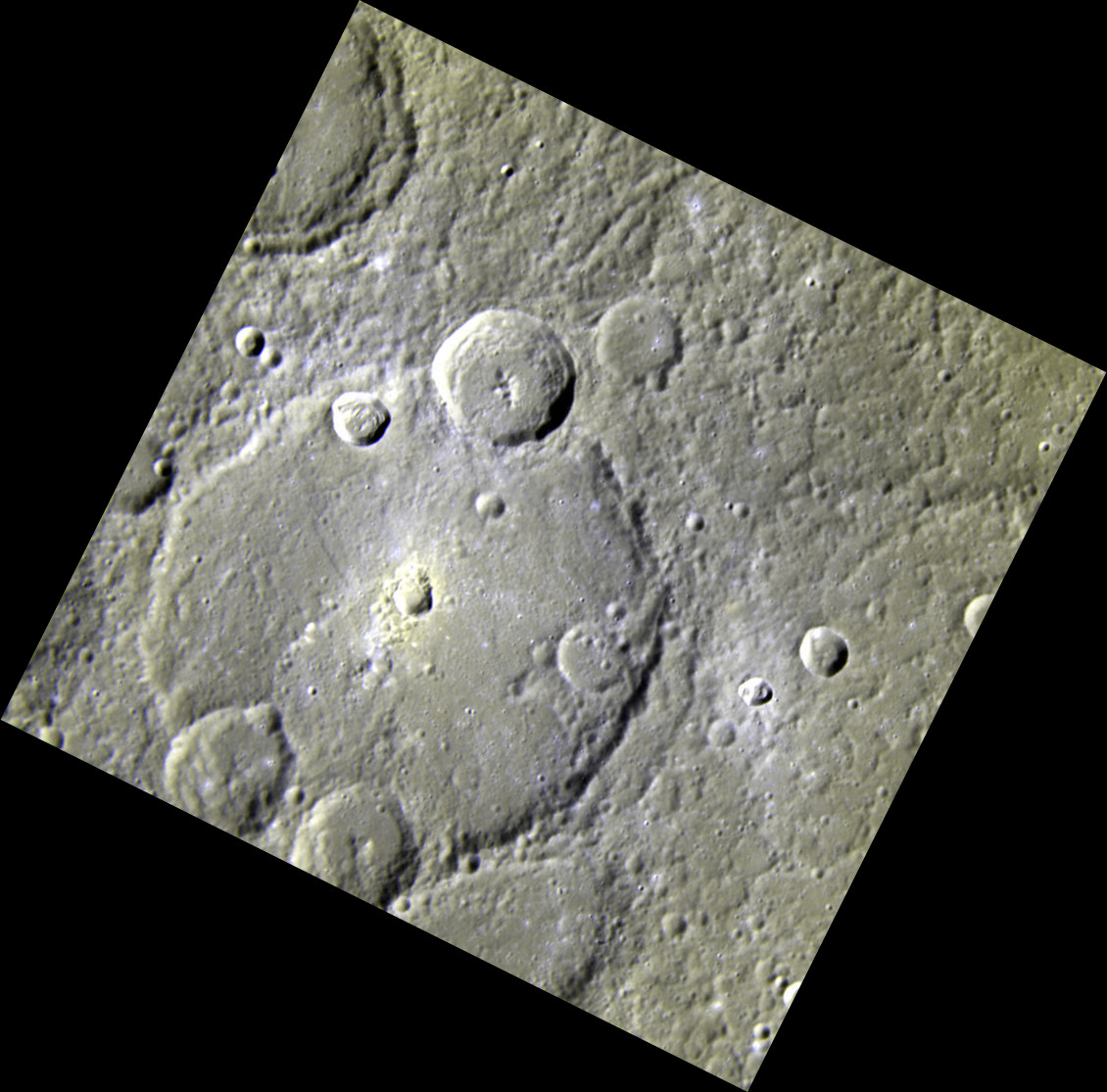
- MESSENGER approximate color image
- Location: Shakespeare quadrangle, Mercury
- Coordinates: 32.82°N 97.65°W
- Diameter: 115.0 km (71.5 mi)
- Eponym: Modest Mussorgsky

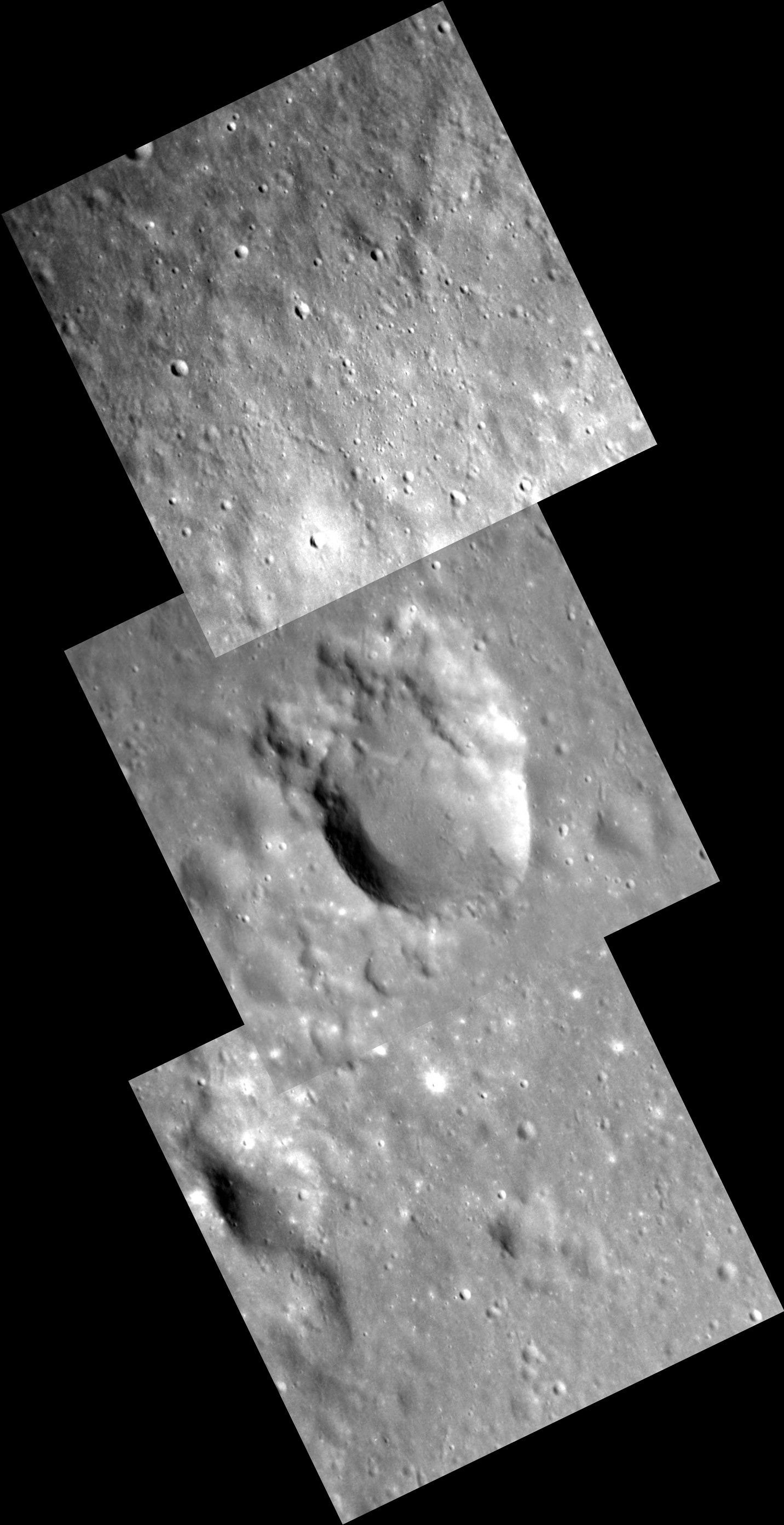
The irregular depression in the center of Mussorgskij crater

Mussorgskij is a crater on Mercury. Its name was adopted by the International Astronomical Union (IAU) in 1979. Mussorgskij is named for the Russian composer Modest Mussorgsky, who lived from 1839 to 1881. The crater was first imaged by Mariner 10 in 1974.

There are irregular depressions at the center of Mussorgskij, which are similar to those within Navoi, Lermontov, Scarlatti, and Praxiteles. The depressions resemble those associated with volcanic explosions.
