= Vasily and Andrey Shchelkalov =

16th-century/early 17th-century Russian diplomats

Vasily Yakovlevich Shchelkalov (Василий Яковлевич Щелкалов in Russian) (before 1566 – 1610 or 1611) and Andrey Yakovlevich Shchelkalov (Андрей Яковлевич Щелкалов) (before 1550 – c. 1597) were two diplomats and heads of the Posolsky Prikaz during the reigns of Ivan the Terrible, Feodor I, and Boris Godunov in Russia. The brothers came from the insignificant Shchelkalov clan; their father, Yakov Semyonovich, was a dyak with no power. Despite these beginnings, they were able to achieve a significant and influential role in the dealings of the Russian government.

== Andrey Yakovlevich Shchelkalov ==
It is known that Andrey was older than his brother by 10 years; however, his date of birth is unknown. The name of Andrey Yakovlevich Shchelkalov first appeared in 1550, when he was entered in the so-called Book of a Thousand (Тысячная книга, or Tysyachnaya kniga). The book contained genealogical information on noble Muscovite families (1070 people altogether, hence, the name of the book) and their land allotments around Moscow. In 1560, Andrey Shchelkalov was assigned to the Lithuanian ambassadors as a police officer. In 1563, he became a dyak (government official). In 1566, Andrey Shchelkalov was promoted to the rank of duma dyak (the lowest rank in the Boyar Duma). He also took part in the Zemsky Sobor that same year and put his signature under its resolutions.

Andrey Shchelkalov rose to power during the Oprichnina period of mass executions of well-known government officials possibly as early as 1570 (although some sources say 1573). He was appointed head of the Posolsky Prikaz (foreign policy), Razryadny Prikaz (dealt with the service class people, military affairs, and southern cities of Russia), Pomestny Prikaz (land distribution), Kazan Palace Prikaz (administrative, judicial and financial affairs of the Russian Southeast) and one of the regional offices of the Chetvertnoy Prikaz (administrative, judicial, fiscal, and financial affairs of the taxpayers). In 1581, Andrey Shchelkalov conducted negotiations with a papal legate Antonio Possevino, and with the English ambassador Jerome Bowes in 1583, which would write in a personal letter from August 12, 1584, that Andrey Shchelkalov and Nikita Romanov (a boyar, who started the Romanov bloodline) "considered themselves the tsars". Foreign envoys, especially the English ones, didn't like Andrey Shchelkalov, as well as his brother Vasili Yakovlevich, for their constant striving to eliminate trade privileges for foreign merchants. Boris Godunov praised Andrey Yakovlevich for his wit and diplomatic dexterity.

However, Andrey Shchelkalov would soon fall into disgrace for his willfulness. Andrey and Vasili were known to have misrepresented family records of noble families and influenced the local administrative hierarchy. Andrey Shchelkalov left diplomatic service in 1594, took monastic vows and assumed the name of Theodosius.

Andrey was described by Dutch traveler Isaac Massa to be more gifted in government than his brother Vasily.

== Vasily Yakovlevich Shchelkalov ==
In 1566, Vasili Yakovlevich took part in the Zemsky Sobor. A year later, he was sent by Ivan the Terrible to sign a peace treaty with Sigismund II of Poland. Later on, Vasili Shchelkalov was put in charge of the Razboyny Prikaz (prosecution and court hearings) in the 1560s, Razryadny Prikaz (1576-1594), Chetvertnoy Prikaz of Nizhny Novgorod (1570-1601), Kazansky Prikaz, and Streletsky Prikaz. He was then appointed head of the Posolsky Prikaz in the mid-1594 and tsar's stamp bearer in 1595. In 1601, Vasili Yakovlevich fell into disgrace for his willfulness and retired. He was rehabilitated during the reign of False Dmitriy I, who made him his okolnichiy (event manager).
