= Lyadov =

Lyadov (Russian: Лядов) is a Russian male surname, its feminine counterpart is Lyadova. It may refer to:

- Anatoly Lyadov (1855–1914), Russian composer and conductor
- Viktor Lyadov (born 1966), Russian pianist
- Yury Lyadov (born 1987), Belarusian Olympic biathlon competitor
- Elena Lyadova (born 1980), Russian actress
- Lyubov Lyadova (born 1952), Russian cross-country skier
- Lyudmila Lyadova (1925–2021), Russian composer
