= Mussorgsky family =

Old Russian noble family

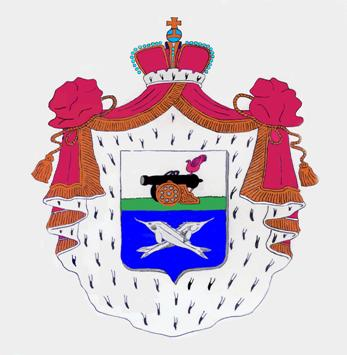
Aladyin coat of arms

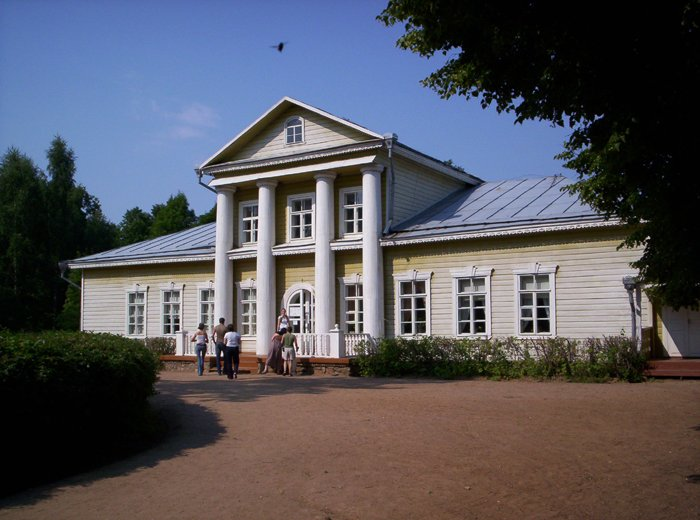
Manor of the Mussorgsky family near Velikiye Luki

The House of Mussorgsky (Russian: Му́соргские), the name of an old Russian noble family, which is one of the branches of rich boyar family of Monastyryov, descendants of princes of Smolensk from Rurikid stock. The family traces its name to Roman Vasilyevich Monastyrev, nicknamed Mussorga (18th generation from Rurik). Peter Ivanovich Mussorgsky governed Staritsa in 1620. One representative of this family is the composer Modest Petrovich Mussorgsky.

== History ==
In the genealogy of the Princes of Smolensk, which is in the Velvet Book and other genealogical works, it is shown that the great-grandson of Great Prince Vladimir Svyatoslavich, Vladimir the Great, who christianized the Rus' land, the Grand Duke Vladimir Vsevolodovich Monomakh had a son Mstislav, Prince of Smolensk, and this one had a son Rostislav, Prince of Smolensk. The aforementioned Prince Mstislav had a great-grandson, Grand Duke Yuri Svyatoslavich of Smolensk. After the death of his father Yuri, the underaged Prince Alexander was taken by his grandmother – Princess Nastasia – who bought him a votchina (estate) in the White Lakes, became a nun and nursed him in the monastery, from which he was called Alexander the Monastery (Александр Юрьевич Монастырь), and from him, the Monastyrevs started. Children of Alexander had lost the titles of Princes.

The Aladyin family was the only family of Monastyrevs stock, including the Monastyrevs themselves, to receive a coat of arms from the ruling Holstein-Gottorp-Romanov dynasty. In 1857, Historian Pyotr Dolgorukov did not deny their ancestry but explicitly questioned their future existence, writing only 5 lines about the family, finishing the paragraph with the anti-punctuation [?.] two signs together: "For their origin, see the previous article about the Monastyrevs. Lyapun and Tretyak, the Yakov children, the Musorgskies, were granted estates in the Moscow district on 2 October 1550. Two Mussorgskys owned inhabited estates in 1699. The coat of arms of this family is not in the armorial, and we doubt whether it [the feminine word for 'family' in Russian is also identical to 'surname' in English] still exists today?."
