= List of burials at Nikolskoe Cemetery =

Coordinates: 59°55′17.04″N 30°23′29.04″E

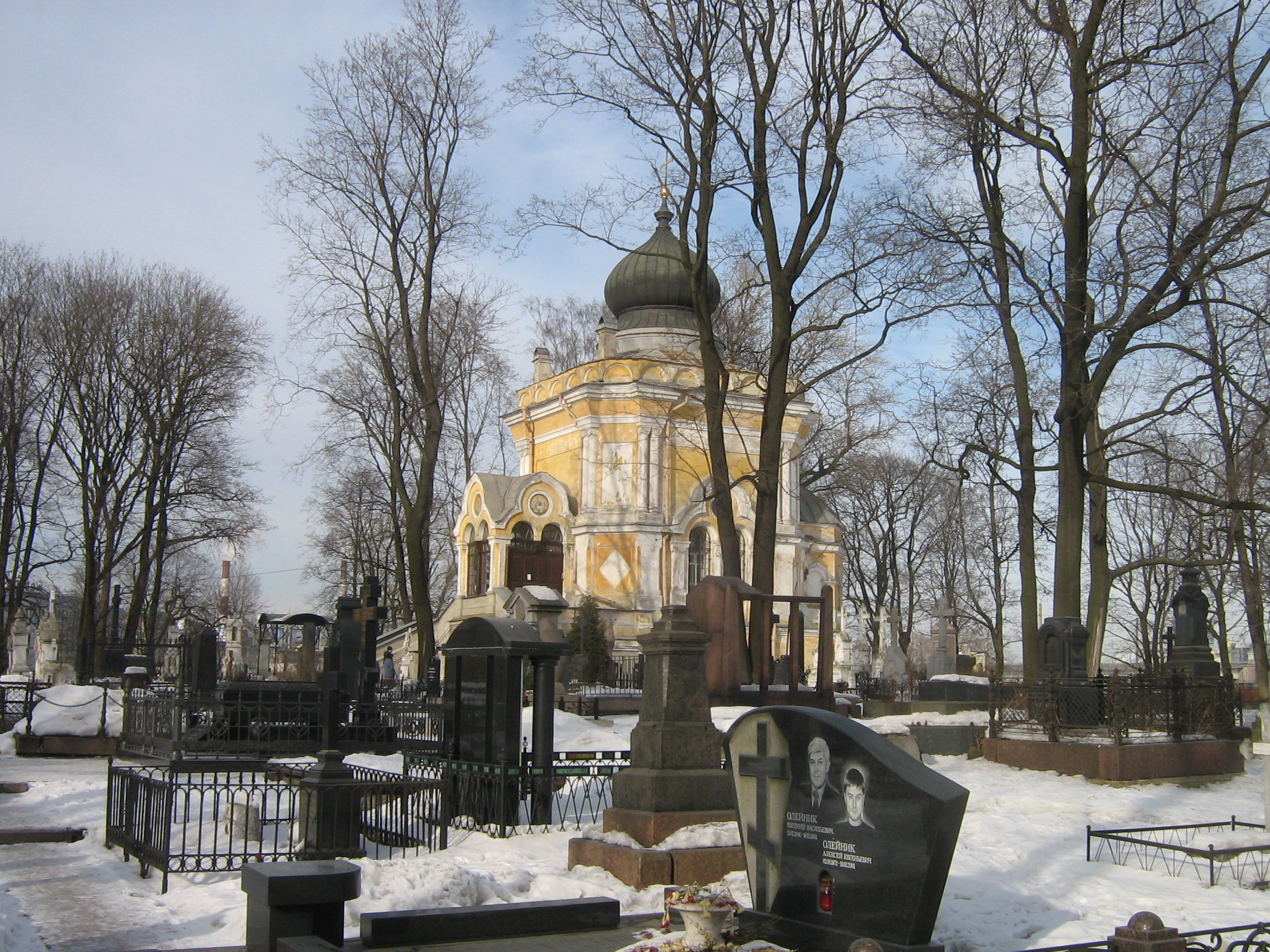
Monuments of the Nikolskoe Cemetery and the Church of St. Nicholas.

Nikolskoe Cemetery (Russian: Никольское кладбище) is part of the Alexander Nevsky Lavra in the centre of Saint Petersburg, and contains a large number of burials as well as monuments and memorials to notable figures in Russian Imperial history, as well as those of Soviet and post-Soviet times.

The cemetery, opened in 1863, was the third cemetery in the monastery complex, after the original Lazarevskoe Cemetery in the 1710s, and the Tikhvin Cemetery in 1823. It became known as the Nikolskoe after the construction of the Church of St. Nicholas between 1868 and 1871 to the design of diocesan architect Grigory Karpov. From its inception burial there was restricted to the elite of society, the monastery's Spiritual Council noting that "the Lavra cemetery is not open to everyone, as are the city cemeteries, but only a few persons from the government service and persons with honorary titles are buried here." Part of the cemetery also served as the burial site for the Monastery's monks and the metropolitans of St. Petersburg, leading to the name Bratskoe (Russian: Братское), or "Brotherhood" section. Wealthy patrons commissioned large chapels and crypts, with elaborate decorations and reliefs from prominent artists such as Nikolay Laveretsky, Ivan Podozerov, Robert Bach and Ivan Schroeder.

Despite this the cemetery was not considered to have any particular artistic or historical value during the Soviet period. It was closed in 1927 and sporadic efforts were made during the 1930s and 1940s to eliminate it, with the graves of several prominent figures were transferred to the Lazarevskoe, Tikhvin and Volkovo cemeteries; including Vera Komissarzhevskaya, Ivan Goncharov, Anton Rubinstein and Boris Kustodiev. Other graves were lost or destroyed. The Church of St Nicholas was closed in 1932, and the cemetery fell into neglect.

The Nikolskoe Cemetery was restored and landscaped in the 1970s, with a columbarium built between 1979 and 1980. The cemetery church was repaired and reconsecrated on 22 April 1985. Burials resumed in the late 1970s, and since 1989 a comprehensive restoration of monuments has been underway.

== Burials and monuments ==
Image	Name	Born	Died	Occupation	Monument	Reference
	Antonina Abarinova	1842	1901	Opera singer, contralto, mezzo-soprano, Mariinsky Theatre, Alexandrinsky Theatre		
	Vsevolod Abramovich	1890	1913	Аviation pioneer, test pilot, altitude and endurance records		
	Nikolay Aksyonenko	1949	2005	Railway manager and politician, Minister of Railways, First Deputy Prime Minister of Russia.		
	Yuri Arnold	1811	1898	Composer, musicologist, music critic, choral conductor, theorist and music educator.		
	Dmitry Averkiyev	1836	1905	Playwright, theatre critic, novelist, publicist and translator. Frol Skorbeyev and Old Times in Kashira		
	Dmitry Bagration	1863	1919	Army officer, general and military writer. First World War, Caucasian Native Cavalry Division, Kornilov affair, Red Army, High Cavalry School		
	Andrei Bantikov	1914	2001	Painter, member of the Leningrad Union of Soviet Artists, Leningrad School of Painting.		
	Abrek Barsht	1919	2006	Combat pilot, World War II, colonel and Hero of the Soviet Union.		
	Fyodor Batyushkov	1857	1920	Philologist, editor (Kosmopolis, Mir Bozhy), literary critic, theatre and literary historian.		
	Aleksei Birilev	1844	1915	Naval officer, admiral, member of the State Council, Minister of the Navy		
	Valentin Bobryshev	1945	2022	Military officer, general, commander of the Leningrad Military District		
	Mikhail Brusnev	1864	1937	Explorer, Bolshevik activist, 1901 arctic expedition. Eduard von Toll, Aleksandr Kolchak.		
	Igor Bunich	1937	2000	Historian, revisionist interpretations of Russian history.		
	Grigory Butakov	1820	1882	Naval officer, admiral, Crimean War. Steam-powered ship tactics, New Principles of Steamboat Tactics, Demidov Prize, State Council		
	Nikolai Chagin	1823	1909	Architect, Vilnius, Crimea. Byzantine Revival, Nativity Cathedral, Riga, Cathedral of the Theotokos, Vilnius.		
	Vladimir Chikolev	1845	1898	Scientist, electrical eningeering.		
	David Chubinashvili	1841	1891	Lexicographer, linguist, and scholar of Georgian literature.		
	Vladimir Dobrovolsky	1834	1877	Military officer, general, 1877–1878 Russo-Turkish War. Battle of Lovcha, Siege of Plevna.		
	Sergei Dukhovskoi	1838	1901	Military officer, general, Priamur and Governor-General of Turkestan, Ataman of the Priamur Cossack host.		
	Evgeny Feoktistov	1828	1898	Journalist, editor, historian, state official. Russkaya Rech.		
	Dmitry Filippov	1944	1998	Statesman, political and public figure, industrialist, member of the Council of Ministers of the Soviet Union, supervisor of industry of the Leningrad Regional Committee of the Communist Party, head of State Tax Inspection in St. Petersburg.		
	Sergei Gershelman	1854	1910	Army officer, general, Russo-Japanese War, Governor-General of Moscow.		
	Boris Golitsyn	1862	1916	Physicist, inventor of the electromagnetic seismograph, seismologist, president of the International Seismology Association, member of the Royal Society.		
	Grigory Golitsyn	1838	1907	Military officer, statesman, Caucasian War, Governor of Uralsk Oblast; Governor of Transcaucasia.		
	Ivan Grigorovich	1853	1930	Naval officer, admiral, Minister of the Navy, Russo-Japanese War, First World War, member of the State Council. Initially buried in France, reburied in the family vault in the Nikolskoe Cemetery in 2005.		
	Lev Gumilyov	1912	1992	Historian, ethnologist, anthropologist and Persian translator. Ethnogenesis, historiosophy, eurasianism.		
	Natalia Iretskaya	1845	1922	Singer and teacher, Saint Petersburg Conservatory.		
	Aleksandra Ishimova	1805	1881	Translator, children's author. Little Star, Rays of Light, History of Russia in Stories for Children, Demidov Prize.		
	Alexandra Jacobi	1841	1918	Journalist, memoirist and publicist, translator and publisher.		
	Nikolay Karazin	1842	1908	Military officer, painter and writer. Imperial Academy of Arts, January Uprising, Russo-Turkish War.		
	Evgeny Karnovich	1823	1885	Writer, historian, journalist and editor. Sovremennik, Golos.		
	Vasily Kenel	1834	1893	Architect. St Petersburg Academy of Arts, Ciniselli Circus, Grand Duke Vladimir Alexandrovich of Russia, Vladimir Palace.		
	Ernesto Köhler	1849	1907	Flautist and composer.		
	Fyodor Kokoshkin	1871	1918	Lawyer and politician, State Duma deputy, a founding member of the Constitutional Democratic Party, Controller general of the Provisional Government.		
	Nikolay Koksharov	1818	1893	Mineralogist, crystallographer, army officer, major general.		
	Mikhail Komelkov	1923	2003	Flying ace, Second World War, Hero of the Soviet Union		
	Roman Kondratenko	1857	1904	Army officer, general, Russo-Japanese War, Siege of Port Arthur		
	Fyodor Koni	1809	1889	Dramatist, theatre critic and literary historian, editor and memoirist		
	Nestor Kotlyarevsky	1863	1925	Author, publicist, literary critic and historian. Moscow University, The Nineteenth Century		
	Maksim Kovalevsky	1851	1916	Sociologist, president of the International Institute of Sociology, Psycho-Neurological Institute, Russian Academy of Sciences.		
	Mikhail Koyalovich	1828	1891	Theologian, historian, translator, Archaeological Commission.		
	Nikolai Linevich	1839	1908	Military officer, General of Infantry, Russo-Turkish War, Boxer Rebellion, Battle of Peking, Russo-Japanese War.		
	Mirra Lokhvitskaya	1869	1905	Poet, Pushkin Prize, the "Russian Sappho", Silver Age of Russian Poetry.		
	Aleksandr Lopukhin	1852	1904	Bible commentator, Lopukhin Bible.		
	Askold Makarov	1925	2000	Ballet dancer and professor, leading soloist at the Kirov Ballet, director of the Saint Petersburg State Academic Ballet, USSR State Prize, People's Artist of the USSR		
	Konstantin Makovsky	1839	1915	Painter, Peredvizhniki. Beneath the Crown, representative of Academic art.		
	Mikhail Malofeyev	1956	2000	Military officer, general, missing in Grozny, Chechnya. Posthumous Hero of Russia.		
	Markell	1821 or 1825	1903	Russian Orthodox Church clergy, Bishop of Lublin, Bishop of Kamianets-Podilskyi, Bishop of Polotsk. Initially buried in the Isidorovskaya Church, reburied in the Nikolskoe Cemetery in 1932.		
	Boleslav Markevich	1822	1884	Writer, essayist, journalist, and literary critic; author of Marina of the Aluy Rog, A Quarter of a Century Ago, The Turning Point and The Void.		
	Aleksey Mazurenko	1917	2004	Military officer, aviator, Second World War, twice Hero of the Soviet Union		
	Mikhail Mikeshin	1835	1896	Artist, House of Romanov, Imperial Academy of Arts, Millennium of Russia, "Orthodoxy, Autocracy, and Nationality".		
	Konstantin Mikhaylovsky	1834	1909	Engineer, Alexander Railway Bridge, Novomariinsky Canal, Volga–Baltic Waterway, railways, Actual Privy Councillor.		
	Vasily Minakov	1921	2016	Military officer, naval aviation pilot, Second World War, Major General of Aviation, Hero of the Soviet Union		
	Alexander Nakashidze	1837	1905	Army general, Caucasian War		
	Aleksandr Nelidov	1835	1910	Diplomat, Russo-Turkish War, Treaty of San Stefano and Treaty of Berlin. Ambassador to Saxony, Italy and France. 1907 Hague Peace Conference.		
	Nikodim	1929	1978	Russian Orthodox metropolitan of Leningrad and Novgorod, World Council of Churches, Second Vatican Council		
	Nikolai Obruchev	1830	1904	Military officer, general staff officer, military statistician, planner and chief of the Main Staff. Voyenny Sbornik, Russo-Turkish War.		
	Mikhail Ostrovsky	1827	1901	Statesman, Minister of State Property.		
	Palladiy	1827	1898	Orthodox bishop, Metropolitan of St. Petersburg and Ladoga, member of the Holy Synod. Initially buried in the Isidorovskaya Church, reburied in the Nikolskoe Cemetery in 1932.		
	Volodymyr Pidvysotskyi	1857	1913	Pathologist, endocrinologist, immunologist and microbiologist. Institute of Experimental Medicine, until his death Member of the Paris Anatomical Society and Member of the Imperial Military Medical Academy		
	Viacheslav Platonov	1939	2005	Volleyball player and coach. Avtomobilist Leningrad, coach of Russia men's national volleyball team, Volleyball Hall of Fame.		
	Alexei Polivanov	1855	1920	Military officer, infantry general, Minister of War, chief of the General Staff. Appointed to State Council. First World War, Red Army service.		
	Alexander Presnyakov	1870	1929	Historian, Russian Academy of Sciences, Princely Law in Old Rus, The Tsardom of Muscovy , The Development of the State of Great Russia, revisionist biographies of Alexander I and Nicholas I. Institute of Historical Studies.		
	Vasily Rakov	1909	1996	Military pilot, Soviet Naval Aviation, twice Hero of the Soviet Union, Winter War, Second World War, Major-General.		
	Nikolay Rodin	1923	2003	Military officer, Soviet Air Force colonel, Hero of the Soviet Union, Second World War.		
	Mikhail Rosenheim	1820	1887	Poet, editor, publicist and translator.		
	Mikhail Sado	1934	2010	Linguist, scholar, Professor of Semitic languages, orientalist, politician, former paratrooper, wrestling champion.		
	Nikolai Sazonov	1834	1902	Stage actor, Alexandrinsky Theatre, Alexander Ostrovsky, The Seagull.		
	Andrei Shingarev	1869	1918	State Duma deputy, Constitutional Democratic Party. Provisional Government, Minister of Agriculture, Minister of Finance.		
	Sergey Shubinsky	1834	1913	Historian, journalist, military officer. Old and New Russia, Istorichesky Vestnik.		
	Anatoly Sobchak	1937	2000	Politician, co-author of the Constitution of the Russian Federation, first democratically elected mayor of Saint Petersburg, mentor and teacher of Vladimir Putin and Dmitry Medvedev.		
	Nicolai Soloviev	1846	1916	Music critic, composer, and teacher at the Saint Petersburg Conservatory.		
	Galina Starovoytova	1946	1988	Dissident, politician and ethnographer.		
	Aleksey Suvorin	1834	1912	Newspaper and book publisher, journalist, Novoye Vremya, Istorichesky Vestnik.		
	Mitrofan Tchaikovsky	1840	1903	Infantry general, commandant of the Ivangorod fortress, commander of the 3rd Army Corps.		
	Ivan Tolstoy	1858	1916	Politician, Vice President of the Russian Imperial Academy of Arts, Minister of Education.		
	Feofil Tolstoy	1809	1881	Composer, music critic and writer.		
	Erast Tsytovich	1830	1898	Military officer, general. 1849 Hungarian campaign, the Caucasian War, Russo-Turkish War, Imperial Military Council.		
	Boris Turayev	1868	1920	Ancient Near East scholar, Russian Academy of Sciences, University of St Petersburg		
	Yury Tyukalov	1930	2018	Olympic rower, 1952 Summer Olympics, 1956 Summer Olympics, 1960 Summer Olympics		
	Fyodor Uglov	1904	2008	Medical professional, oldest practicing surgeon in the world. Winter War, Second World War.		
	Sergei Utochkin	1876	1916	Cyclist, sportsman and aviator.		
	Anthony Vadkovsky	1846	1912	Russian Orthodox bishop and Metropolitan of Saint Petersburg and Ladoga from 1898 to 1912		
	Pyotr Vannovsky	1822	1904	Statesman and military leader, general, Crimean War, Minister of War.		
	Alexander Voeikov	1842	1916	Meteorologist and climatologist, Russian Geographical Society, Voeykov axis.		
	Ivan Vsevolozhsky	1835	1909	Director of the Imperial Theatres, director of the Hermitage Museum.		
	Anastasia Vyaltseva	1871	1913	Mezzo-soprano, specializing in Gypsy art songs.		
	Nikolai Yusupov	1827	1891	Landowner, musician, philanthropist, Active State Councillor, Chamberlain.		
	Tatiana Yusupova	1829	1879	Noblewoman and lady-in-waiting to Empress Alexandra Feodorovna.		
	Lydia Zinovieva-Annibal	1866	1907	Prose writer and dramatist, Silver Age of Russian Poetry.		
	Lydia Zvereva	1890	1916	Aviator, first woman in Russia to earn a pilot's license. Air show competitor, aircraft manufacturer.		
