= Nikolskoe Cemetery =

Cemetery in Saint Petersburg, Russia

Coordinates: 59°55′18″N 30°23′29″E

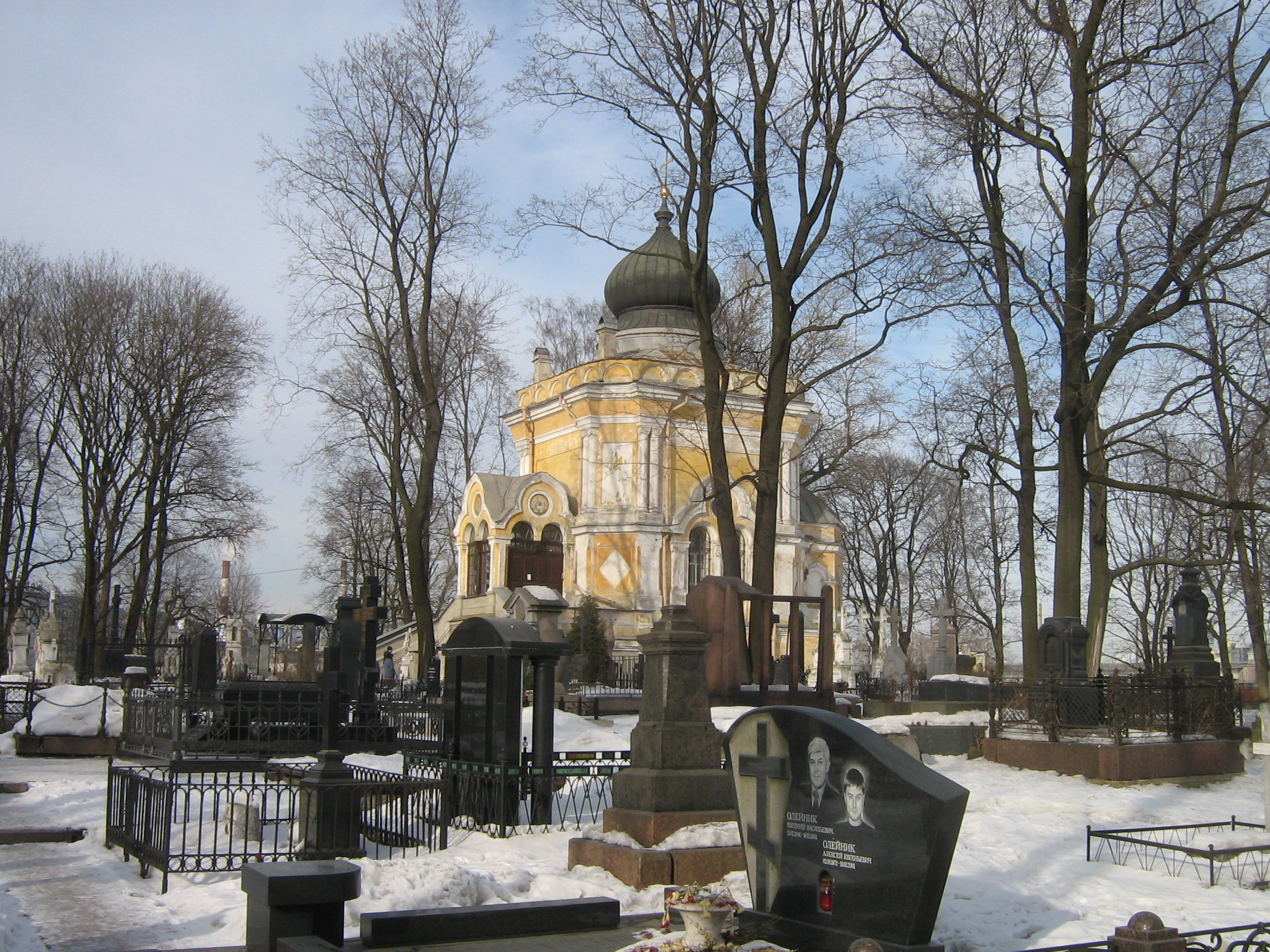
- Monuments of the Nikolskoe Cemetery and the Church of St. Nicholas

Details
- Established: 1871
- Location: Saint Petersburg
- Country: Russia
- Type: Eastern Orthodox

Nikolskoe Cemetery (Russian: Никольское кладбище) is a historic cemetery in the centre of Saint Petersburg. It is part of the Alexander Nevsky Lavra, and is one of four cemeteries in the complex.

The third cemetery to be established in the monastery complex, the Nikolskoe Cemetery opened in 1863, and rapidly became a popular and exclusive burial site for the elite of Saint Petersburg society. It was carefully arranged and landscaped, with its cemetery church opening in 1871. Taking its name from this church, the Church of St. Nicholas, the cemetery functioned also a burial ground for the clergy and monks of the monastery. The wealthy and important of the city commissioned large and elaborate memorials during the later years of the nineteenth century and into the twentieth.

The cemetery fell into disrepair during the Soviet period. Unlike other cemeteries in the Lavra, it was not considered to have any particular historical or artistic value. The church was closed and repurposed, burials ceased, and some memorials of more significant figures were moved to other cemeteries, while others were lost or deliberately destroyed. Restoration work began in the 1970s, returning the site to its park-like form. A columbarium was built, the cemetery church reopened, and work to repair and refurbish the monuments began. Burials recommenced in the late 1970s, and now the cemetery includes prominent figures of Soviet and post-Soviet society, as well as those of the era of Imperial Russia.

== Establishment and early history ==
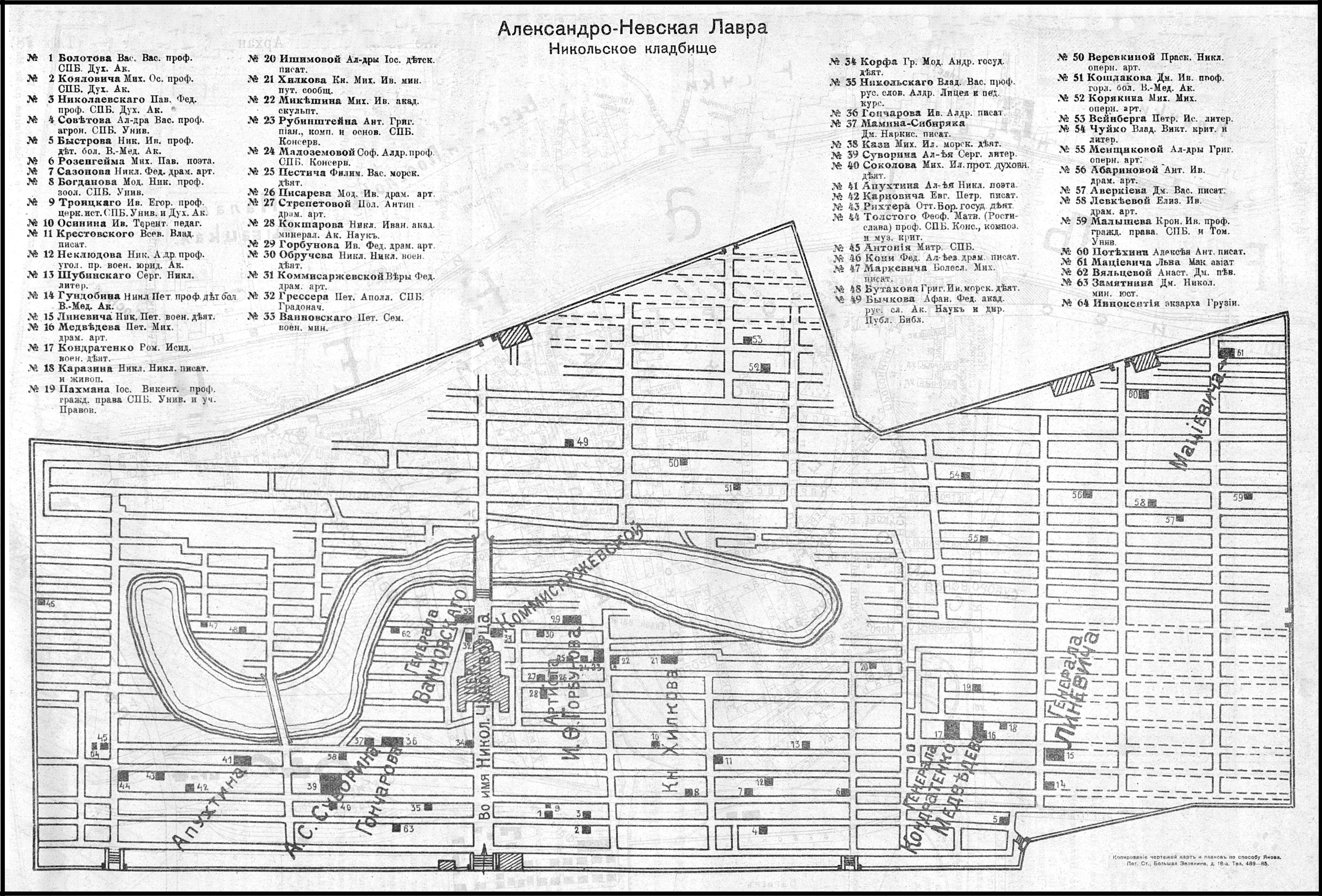
Plan of the cemetery in 1914, showing the regular layout of plots

The cemetery was opened in 1863, to the east of the Cathedral of the Holy Trinity, the main church of the monastery. It was the third cemetery in the complex, after the original Lazarevskoe Cemetery in the 1710s, and the Tikhvin Cemetery in 1823. It was constructed on a space originally planned for a garden at the main entrance to the monastery, but that instead had become used for roads and palisades. It was first called the Zasobornoye Cemetery (Russian: Засоборное), but became known as the Nikolskoe after the construction of the Church of St. Nicholas between 1868 and 1871 to the design of diocesan architect Grigory Karpov. The church was funded by the wealthy merchant N. I. Rusanov, who established his family tomb on the ground floor. The Spiritual Council noted that "the Lavra cemetery is not open to everyone, as are the city cemeteries, but only a few persons from the government service and persons with honorary titles are buried here." Part of the cemetery also served as the burial site for the Monastery's monks and the metropolitans of Saint Petersburg, leading to the name Bratskoe (Russian: Братское), or "Brotherhood" section.

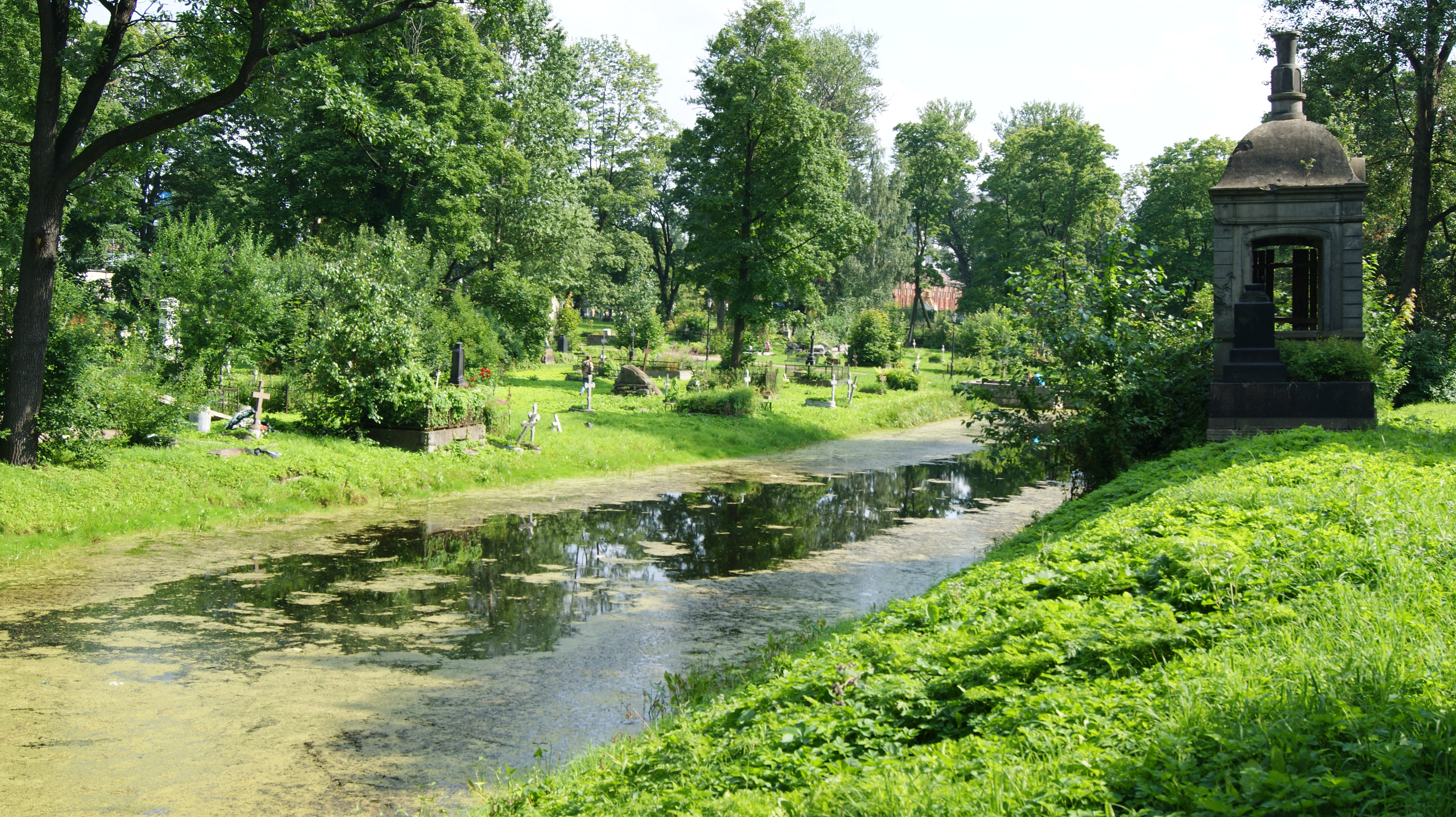
The pond and details of the cemetery landscaping

It became a prestigious burial location, and careful attention was taken in the planning and layout, which was more regular than the early cemeteries, and included a pond in the northern part. A path leads from the main entrance of the cemetery church across a bridge and aligned with the apse of the Trinity Cathedral, forming a longitudinal axis. Paths then diverge in a grid pattern to the sides, running between the Monastyrka River and the southern boundary of the monastery. New burial plots were placed in the south and in the eastern parts of the cemetery, maintaining the grid pattern. Wealthy patrons commissioned large chapels and crypts, with elaborate decorations and reliefs from prominent artists such as Nikolay Laveretsky, Ivan Podozerov, Robert Bach and Ivan Schroeder. Plans in 1896 to build a larger cemetery church in the Byzantine style by architect L. P. Andreyev came to nothing, as did a similar project in 1908, despite a donation of 10 thousand rubles by the ruling metropolitan.

== Soviet period and later use ==
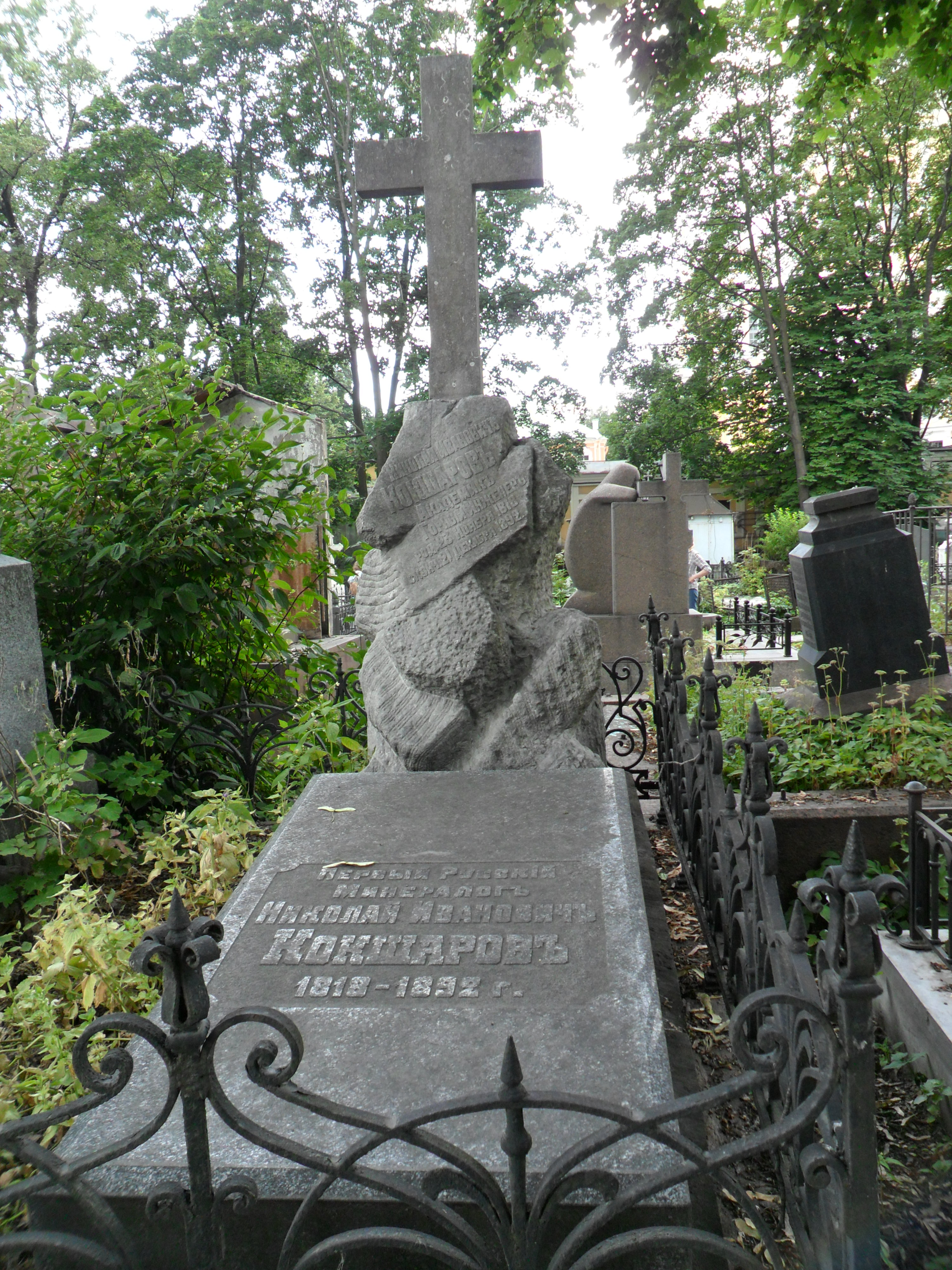
Late-nineteenth century memorials, the grave of Nikolay Koksharov, who died in 1893

The Nikolskoe Cemetery, unlike the Lazarevskoe and Tikhvin cemeteries, was not designated as a museum during the Soviet period, as it was not considered to have any particular artistic or historical value. It was closed in 1927 and sporadic efforts were made during the 1930s and 1940s to eliminate the cemetery, and the graves of several prominent figures were transferred to the Lazarevskoe, Tikhvin and Volkovo cemeteries; including Vera Komissarzhevskaya, Ivan Goncharov, Anton Rubinstein and Boris Kustodiev. Other graves were lost or destroyed. The Church of St Nicholas was closed on 10 December 1932, and it was planned to turn it into a crematorium. A furnace for burning bodies was tested in 1934, but ultimately the plan was abandoned and instead the church became a warehouse and workshop. A 1940 survey by the State Museum of Urban Sculpture identified some two hundred gravestones worthy of preservation.

Severely neglected by the 1970s, plans were drawn up to restore the Alexander Nevsky Lavra. The Nikolskoe Cemetery was restored and landscaped, with a columbarium built between 1979 and 1980. The cemetery church was repaired and re-consecrated on 22 April 1985. The size of the cemetery was somewhat reduced with the construction of an overpass for the Alexander Nevsky Bridge through the western part of the cemetery. Burials resumed in the late 1970s, and since 1989 a comprehensive restoration of monuments has been underway.

== Burials ==
The cemetery contains a wide selection of Saint Petersburg society from the late nineteen and early twentieth centuries. Buried here are the singers Antonina Abarinova, Natalia Iretskaya, and Anastasia Vyaltseva; playwright Dmitry Averkiyev; literary figures Fyodor Batyushkov, Evgeny Feoktistov, Aleksandra Ishimova, Alexandra Jacobi, Evgeny Karnovich, Fyodor Koni, Nestor Kotlyarevsky, Mirra Lokhvitskaya, Boleslav Markevich, Mikhail Rosenheim, Sergey Shubinsky, Aleksey Suvorin, and Lydia Zinovieva-Annibal; artists Nikolay Karazin, Konstantin Makovsky, and Mikhail Mikeshin; composers Nicolai Soloviev and Feofil Tolstoy; architects Nikolai Chagin and Vasily Kenel; dancer Askold Makarov; actor Nikolai Sazonov; and director of the Imperial Theatres Ivan Vsevolozhsky.

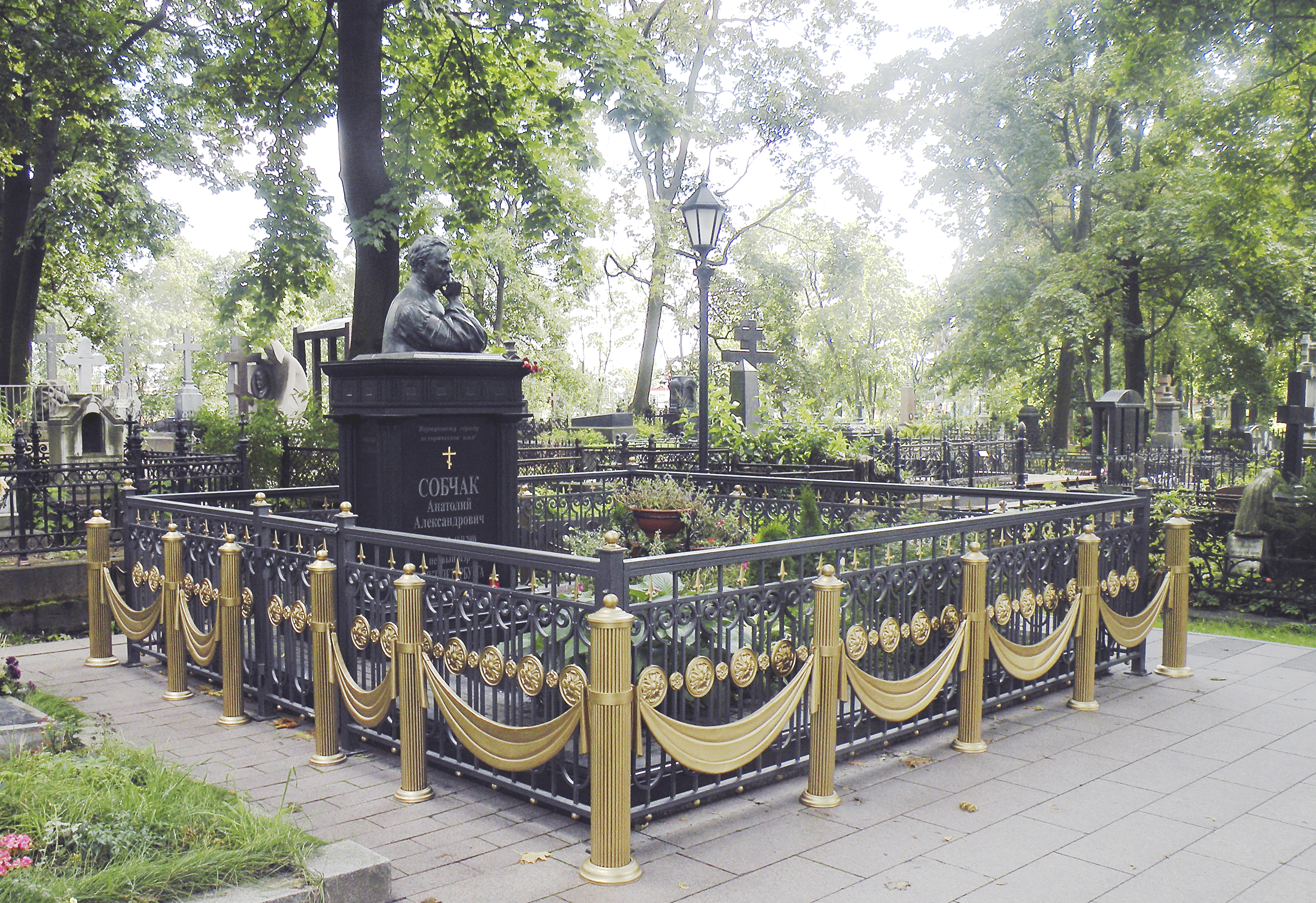
The grave of Anatoly Sobchak, Saint Petersburg's first democratically elected mayor

Important statesmen and politicians of Imperial Russia buried in the cemetery include Fyodor Kokoshkin, Aleksandr Nelidov, and Ivan Tolstoy; while military leaders include generals Dmitry Bagration, Sergei Gershelman, Grigory Golitsyn, Roman Kondratenko, Nikolai Linevich, Nikolai Obruchev, Alexei Polivanov, Erast Tsytovich, and Pyotr Vannovsky; and admirals Aleksei Birilev, Grigory Butakov, and Ivan Grigorovich. Several scientists have been buried here, among whom were Boris Golitsyn, Nikolay Koksharov, Maksim Kovalevsky, and Volodymyr Pidvysotskyi; as well as the academics Lev Gumilyov, Mikhail Koyalovich, Aleksandr Lopukhin, Mikhail Sado, and Boris Turayev. Interments in the post-Soviet period include sports figures Viacheslav Platonov and Yuriy Tyukalov; political figures Dmitry Filippov, Anatoly Sobchak, and Galina Starovoytova; Soviet-era military pilots Aleksey Mazurenko, Vasily Minakov and Nikolay Rodin; and General Mikhail Malofeyev. Early Russian aviation pioneers Vsevolod Abramovich and Lydia Zvereva were also buried in the cemetery. Also buried here is Fyodor Uglov, who died at the age of 103, having been listed by the Guinness Book of Records as the oldest practising surgeon in the world.
