= Barsht =

Barsht is a Yiddish surname literally meaning "borscht" (Yiddish: בארשט). Notable people with the surname include:

- Abrek Barsht (1919–2006), Russian Jewish pilot, World War II Hero of the Soviet Union

== Fictional characters ==
- Steve Barsht from Sabotage (1939 film)
