= Manor of Priklonskaya — Levashov — Kildyushevsky =

- Усадьба Приклонской — Левашова — Кильдюшевского
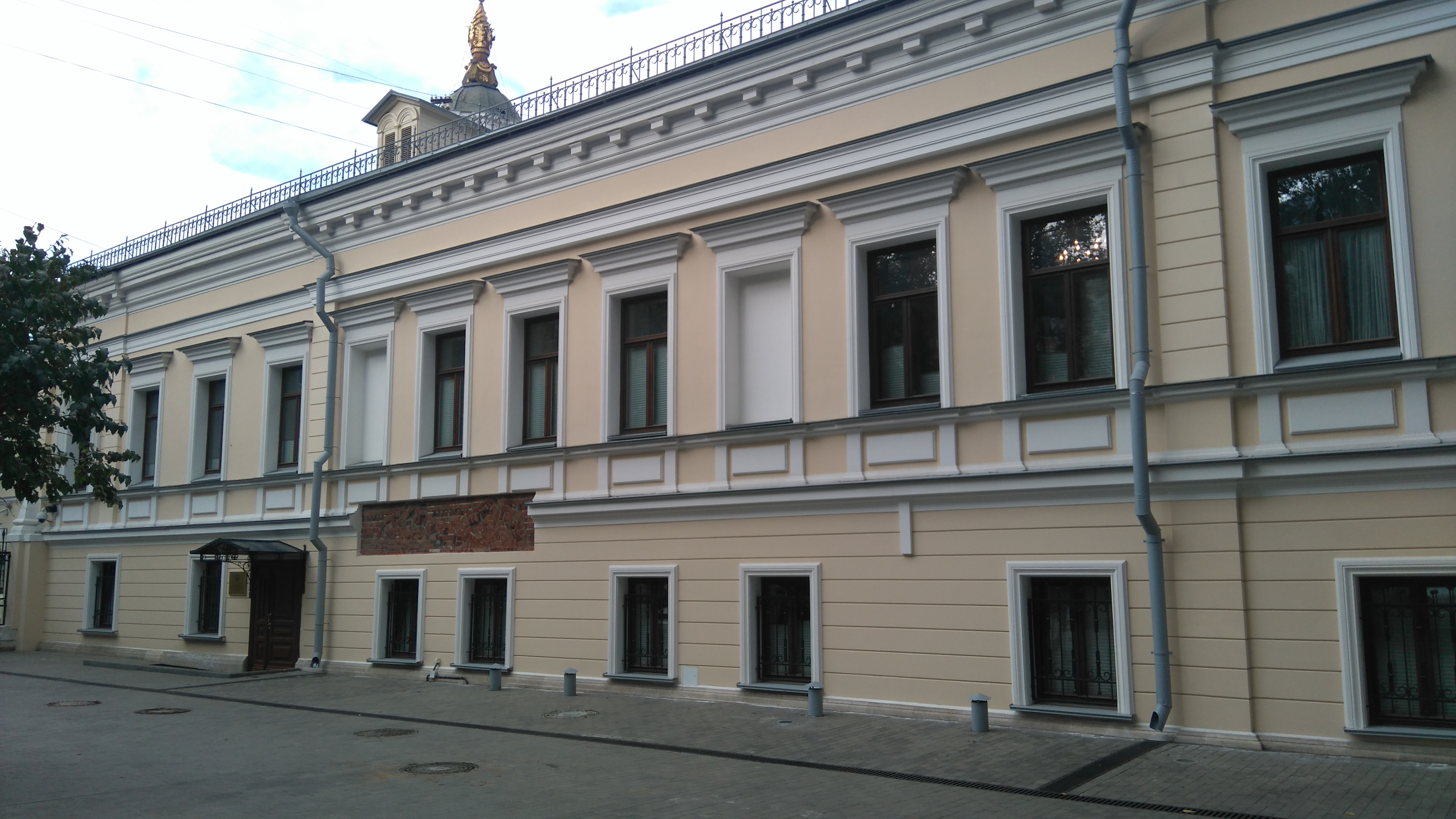
- Interactive map of Manor of Priklonskaya — Levashov — Kildyushevsky
- Location: Moscow, Archangel's lane, house 10, building 2
- Coordinates: 55°45′45″N 37°38′22″E

The Manor of Priklonskaya — Levashov — Kildyushevsky (Russian: Усадьба Приклонской — Левашова — Кильдюшевского) is a building in the center of Moscow (Arkhangelsk pereulok, house 10, building 2). Represents the rebuilt chambers of the 17th century. The building has the status of an object of cultural heritage of federal significance.

== History ==
Chambers in Arkhangelsk pereulok were built in the late 17th century. At the beginning of the 18th century, they belonged to the Proviantmaster Dumashev. In 1763 the palaces were bought by the Priklonskie brothers. When they were at home, the Spassky Church operated. At the beginning of the 19th century, the chambers belonged to the brigadier Vasily Yakovlevich Levashov (1747–1831). When it was in 1834, the chambers were built up with a second stone floor (the former wooden burned down during the fire of 1812). Soon after, the owner of the chambers was the staff captain N. P. Kildyushsky, the father of the doctor P. N. Kildyushevsky. With it, the layout and interiors were redone. In the second half of the XIX - early 20th century in the building there were apartments that were rented. In 1862, one of them filmed the future lawyer Anatoly Koni, it was his first apartment in Moscow.

During the Soviet era, the building housed residential apartments. In the 1930s, there was a plan for the demolition of the ownership and construction of a printing house on this site, but it was not carried out. In 2014, the restoration of the building was carried out. At present it is occupied by the Russian Military Historical Society. In the yard in front of the building, called the "Square of Commanders," many monuments and busts have been installed.

== Architecture ==
The two-storeyed building of the chambers is built of a big brick. With the neighboring house (Arkhangelsk lane, 10, building 1) it was connected by a gallery. On the red line of Arkhangelsk pereulok comes the end of the building, attached later. The main facade is facing towards Potapov lane and is separated from it by the front yard. The facades of the building are decorated in the style of late classicism. The original decor of the chambers (curbs in the cornices, brick platbands) was partially lost and hidden by plaster. Next to the main entrance is a fragment of the original clypeus with a keeled finish. On the first floor and in the basement preserved the ancient vaults.
