= 30th Central Scientific Research Institute, Ministry of Defence (Russia) =

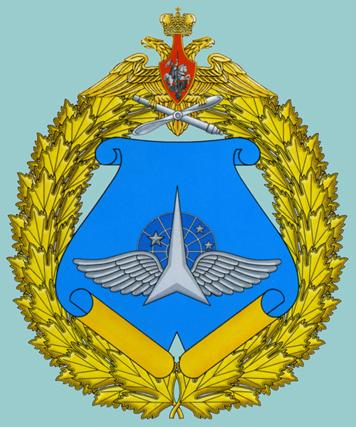
- Active: 1961–2011
- Country: Soviet Union (1961–1991); CIS (1991–1992); Russia (1992–2011)
- Branch: Russian Air Force
- Type: Scientific Research
- Garrison/HQ: Shchyolkovo, Moscow Oblast
- Decorations: Order of the Red Star

30th Central Scientific Research Institute, Ministry of Defence (Russian: 30-й центральный научно-исследовательский институт Министерства обороны Российской Федерации) was a scientific research organization operated by the Ministry of Defence of Russia which was dedicated to leading a wide range of studies in support of enhancing the Russian Air Force's capabilities and development of the aerospace warfighting methods, technologies and complexes.

In the English-language sources, the institute is often mentioned by the transliteration of its Russian abbreviation – TsNII-30. The institute was located in Shchyolkovo (Russian: Щёлково), Moscow Oblast at the Chkalovsky Airport.

In 2010, TsNII-30 was reorganized and became an organizational unit of the 4th Central Scientific Research Institute.

TsNII-30 has operated for exactly 50 years.

== History ==
TsNII-30 was established on January 16, 1961.

Its original name was the Central Scientific Research Institute, Russian Air Force. It was based on the Ministry of Defence Computer Center No. 3 in Noginsk, Moscow Oblast. The center got the status of one of the TsNII-30 organizational units - Air Force Control Systems Research Center — Научно-исследовательский центр систем управления ВВС. Later, TsNII-15, Russian Navy research institute, located in Leningrad was amalgamated with the TsNII-30 and became its subsidiary focused on the Navy aviation.

As of 2006, the institute's workforce had 16 Doctors of Science and 215 Ph.Ds (Candidates of Science).

The TsNII-30 has closely cooperated with the Scientific Council of the Russian Air Force, other Ministry of Defence research institutes (TsNII-46, TsNII-4, TsNII-16, etc.), defence industry research institutes (Gromov Flight Research Institute, GosNIIAS, Baranov Central Institute of Aviation Motor Development, TsAGI, etc.), aviation design bureaus (Tupolev, Mikoyan, Antonov, Yakovlev, Ilyushin, and Russian Academy of Sciences’ organizations.

=== Scope of activities and projects ===
The fields of the TsNII-30 research included strategic, tactical, technical, economical studies. Some of areas of the activities were:

- Threat assessment and forecasting.
- Defining operational and technical requirements.
- Monitoring defence industry progress on the Russian Air Force acquisitions.
- Performance evaluations of the newly developed aerospace technologies and complexes.

Systems approach to the development and procurement of the aerospace warfighting means and simulation modeling were the corner stones of the TsNII-30 research methodology.

TsNII-30 was part of a broad Russian aerospace industry cooperation to build:

- Spiral spaceplane
- Buran (spacecraft)

== Commanders ==
- Zelik Yoffe (1961—1969)
- Anatoly Molotkov (1969—1988)
- Georgy Shonin (1988—1990)
- Vladimir Kovalyonok (1990—1992)
- Vasily Aleksandrov (1992—1998)
- Sergei Shalaev (1998—1999)
- Alexander Gerasimov (2000—2007)
- Yuri Balyko (2007—2011)

== Notable personnel ==
- Viktor Artamonov,
- Vycheslav Baklitskii
- Anatoly Glazkov
- Gennady Gorchitsa
- Sergey Grigorov
- Aleksei Gubarev
- Vasily Minakov
- Vladimir Tupikov
- Yevgeny Khrunov
- Arthur Yuryev

== Sample books published ==
- Baklit︠s︡kiĭ, Vi︠a︡cheslav Konstantinovich; Bochkarev, A. M.; Musʹi︠a︡kov, M. P. (1986). Metody filʹtrat︠s︡ii signalov v korreli︠a︡t︠s︡ionno-ėkstremalʹnykh sistemakh navigat︠s︡ii [Signal Filtering Methods In Correlation Navigation Systems] (in Russian). Moscow: Radio i svi︠a︡zʹ.
- Panov, V.V., Gorchitsa, G.I., Balyko, Y.P., et el "Forming a concept of the future aviation complexes" 2010, 608p. ISBN 978-5-217-03478-9.
- Platunov, V.S. "Methodology of the defence scientific research in aviation complexes: 30 TsNII. 2005. 343p. ISBN 5-902370-42-6.

== International activities ==
In the early 1990s, TsNII-30 staff participated in the preparation of the Russian Air Force exhibitions and represented Russia at the international air shows.

- ILA Berlin Air Show, 1991.
- Russian-American seminar on the US Air Force combat in Operation Desert Storm. Moscow. October 12, 1992. American side was represented by the RAND corporation analysts. The delegation was headed by Ambassador Robert Blackwill Russian delegation included researchers from TsNII-30 and Air Force Engineering Academy. The keynote report was made by Benjamin S. Lambeth from RAND.
- Australian International Airshow. October 1992. Avalon, Victoria, Australia. Russian delegation presented supercargo Antonov AN-124 and helicopters Mil Mi-17 and Kamov Ka-32.
- International Conference Air Power. February 11–12, 1993. London, Great Britain. The Head of the TsNII-30 Vassily E. Aleksandrov presented a paper on "Prospects for Air Superiority Fighter Development"
- Abbotsford International Airshow, August 1993. Russia was represented by the "Russian Knights" aerobatic group flying Sukhoi Su-27, and Ilyushin Il-76 cargo.
