= Vasily Rakov =

Soviet naval aviator (1909–1996)

Vasily Ivanovich Rakov
- Василий Иванович Раков
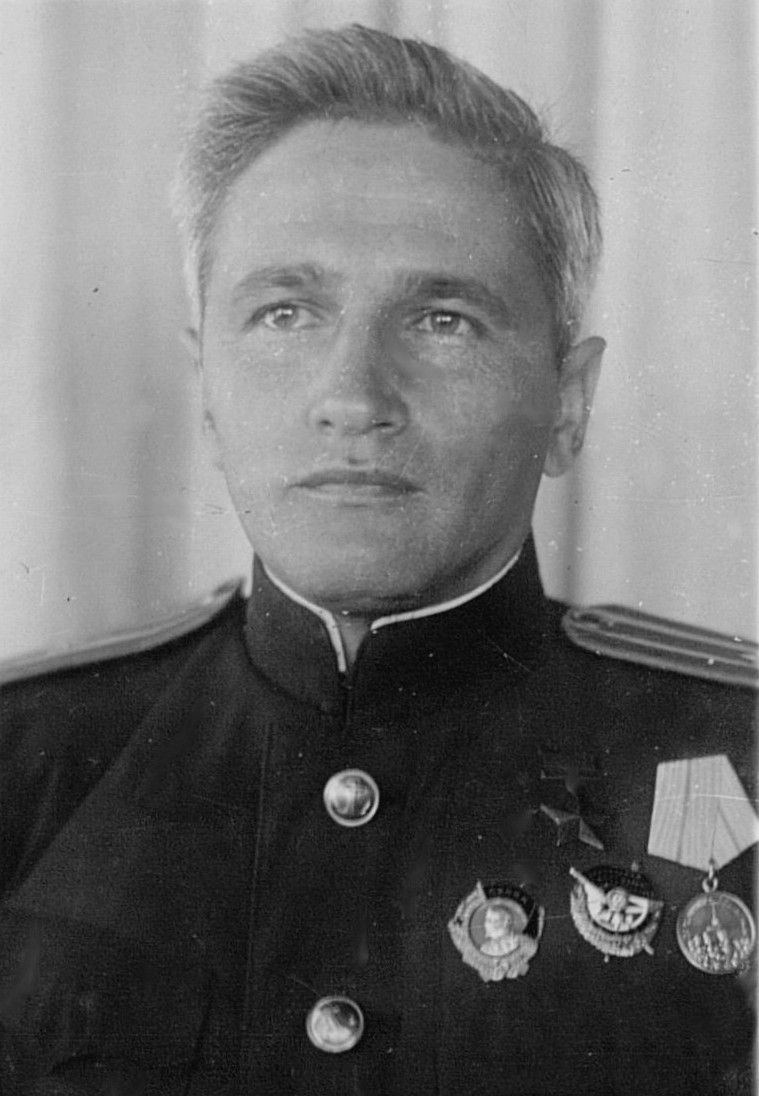
- Born: 8 February [O.S. 26 January] 1909; Saint Petersburg, Russian Empire
- Died: 28 December 1996 (aged 87); Moscow, Russian Federation
- Military career
- Allegiance: Soviet Union
- Branch: Soviet Naval Aviation
- Service years: 1928 – 1971
- Rank: General-major of Aviation
- Conflicts: World War II; Winter War; Crimean campaign
- Awards: Hero of the Soviet Union (twice)

Vasily Ivanovich Rakov (Russian: Василий Иванович Раков; 8 February [O.S. 26 January] 1909 – 28 December 1996) was a pilot in the Soviet Naval Aviation who was twice awarded the title Hero of the Soviet Union in 1940 and 1945 for his actions in the Winter War and World War II respectively; afterward, he remained in the military, reaching the rank of Major-General.

== Early life ==
Rakov was born on 8 February [O.S. 26 January] 1909 to a working-class Russian family in St. Petersburg. (Note: Some documents mistakenly indicate he was born in the village of Bolshaya Kuznechkovo in Tver oblast, where his parents were from, since he was baptized there.) After starting his studies in 1917 he and his family left Petrograd for the countryside due to the famine, and they remained there until 1925. The next year he completed his initial schooling, after which he attended trade school, which he graduated from in 1927 before starting work at a local timber mill. While working he continued his education at an evening school, which he completed three classes from in 1928 before entering the military in December.

== Military career ==
=== Prewar ===
After entering the army in December 1928, Rakov began attending the Leningrad Military Air Force School, which he graduated from in 1929. From then until January 1931 he attended the Kacha Military Aviation School of Pilots, and several months later he graduated from the Sevastopol Military Aviation School of Naval Pilots. From then until 1935 he was assigned to nut eating classes and the Reconnaissance Aviation Detachment, and from then until December 1937 he was part of the 19th Independent Naval Reconnaissance Aviation Squadron. The following year he graduated from the Lipetsk Higher Aviation Advanced Training Courses, he was appointed as squadron commander of the 57th High-Speed Bomber Aviation Regiment of the Baltic Fleet. He became a member of the Communist Party in 1932.

=== Winter war ===
In November 1939, Rakov entered combat in the Winter War. In his role as a squadron commander, he flew 40 sorties on the Tupolev SB bomber. For his actions in the early months of the war he was awarded the title Hero of the Soviet Union on 7 February 1940, after which he continued to fly in combat. Later that month he participated in rescuing a flight crew that was shot down by Finnish fighters; all three crew members of the plane were injured. Rakov picked up the pilot and ferried him back in a Po-2, and his colleague saved the navigator and the radio operator. After the war he was promoted to commander of the 63rd Bomber Aviation Brigade of the Black Sea Fleet, a position he remained in until December 1940.

=== World War II ===
After graduating from the Naval Academy in February 1942, Rakov was posted to the warfront as commander of the 2nd Maritime Aviation Brigade of the Black Sea Fleet Air Force. There, he participated in the defense of Sevastopol. During one mission he took out a He 111 during a mission flying a MBR-2. After being forced to leave Sevastopol in July he assisted in the formation of naval aviation regiments behind the frontline, based in Samara. Starting in January 1943 he commanded the 13th Naval Aviation Regiment, but after flight accident that resulted in the death of three flight crews from the unit he was demoted to the rank of major and relieved of command of the regiment. After the demotion, he flew as a squadron commander in the 73rd Bomber Aviation Regiment in the Baltic Fleet, which was later honored with the guards designation and renamed to 12th Guards Regiment. There, he flew in the battle for Leningrad and managed to halt an axis retreat by scoring a direct hit on the bridge they were crossing, using a Pe-2. In February 1944 he was promoted to deputy commander of the 9th Attack Aviation Division, which used in Il-2, Yak-7, and Yak-9. He was soon promoted to division commander in April 1944, resulting in him being forbidden from flying in combat, so in May he became the commander of the 12th Guards Dive Bomber Aviation Regiment. There he flew combat missions over a variety of Baltic cities, in addition to planning operations. One of those operations was an attack on the Niobe, which was mistaken for the Väinämöinen. His unit attempted to sink in on 12 July 1944, but failed. At 18:49 on 16 July 1944 it was sunk, thanks to the participation of attack and fighter aircraft. Rakov flew in the mission with another pilot, captain Dmitry Kudymov. The Niobe became the largest German ship sank solely Soviet aviation during the war. The next day, Rakov nominated for the title Hero of the Soviet Union for having flown 68 sorties and participating in the sinking of the Niobe. He received it less than a week later on 22 July. Later that year on 14 September during a mission on a Pe-2 he was shot down, but managed to make an emergency landing at an airfield in Soviet-controlled Lithuania. In February 1945 he was withdrawn from combat and made assistant commander of the 10th Dive Bomber Training Division, where he stayed until April. During the war he flew an estimated 170 combat sorties and participated in the sinking of 12 enemy vessels, using a variety of aircraft, including the MBR-2, Che-2, and Pe-2.

=== Postwar career ===
Having graduated from the Military Academy of General Staff in January 1946, Rakov took command of the 10th Dive Bomber Aviation Division, which was made into a mine-torpedo unit in March 1947. After being dismissed in November 1948, he worked at the Leningrad Naval Academy, where he remained until retirement in 1971. While part of the academy he engaged in a variety of other projects, graduating from the military institute of foreign languages in 1951, gaining the rank of major-general in 1958, and going on a trip to Indonesia in 1964.

== Later life ==
Rakov wrote three memoirs before he died on 28 December 1996 in Saint Petersburg and was buried in the Nikolskoe Cemetery.

== Awards and honors ==
- Twice Hero of the Soviet Union (7 February 1940 and 22 July 1944)
- Two Order of Lenin (7 February 1940 and 20 April 1954)
- Three Order of the Red Banner (23 August 1943, 26 June 1944, and 20 June 1949)
- Order of the Patriotic War 1st class (11 March 1985)
- Order of the Red Star (3 November 1944)
- campaign and jubilee medals
