= Sergei Dukhovskoi =

Russian military officer

Sergei Mikhailovich Dukhovskoi
- Сергей Михайлович Духовский
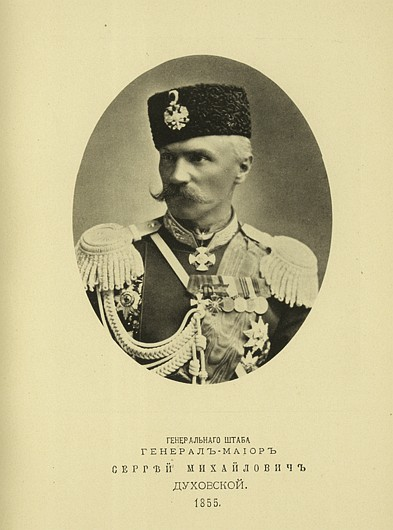
- Born: 7 October 1838; Nizhny Novgorod, Russian Empire
- Died: 17 April 1901 (aged 62); Saint Petersburg, Russian Empire
- Occupations: Military officer; Governor-General of Priamurye; Governor-General of Turkestan
- Years active: 1855–1901
- Spouse: Princess Varvara Golitsyna

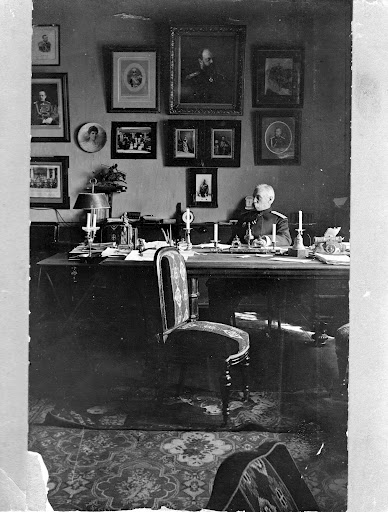
Governor-General Dukhovskoi in Khabarovsk (1894)

Sergei Mikhailovich Dukhovskoi (Russian: Серге́й Миха́йлович Духо́вский; 7 October 1838 – 17 April 1901) was a Russian military officer who served as Governor-General of Priamurye, where he was also Ataman of the Priamurye Cossack Host, before later being appointed Governor-General of Turkestan.

== Biography ==
Sergei Mikhailovich Dukhovskoi was born in 1838 into a non-noble family. His grandfather Peter Sergeiivich Ierei (1772-1819) was a Russian Orthodox priest in a village outside Nizhny Novgorod. Peter Sergeiivich served the Holy Spirit Church, which was the origin of the new family name “Dukhovskoi” adopted by the priest's son Mikhail Petrovich (1796-1888). Dukhovskoi's father matriculated at the Nizhny Novgorod Theological Seminary, where he later served from 1814-1818 as a teacher. His father then worked as an instructor and inspector at the local theological school and taught Latin at the Nizhny Novgorod Gymnasium for ten years. He was employed by the Department of Treasury before becoming Director of the Clerical Office and senior accountant of the Artillery Department as a collegiate councilor. Dukhovskoi's mother, Elena Matveevna Alymova (1812-1840), died while her son was still young.

After graduating from the Cadet Corps, Dukhovskoi entered the Leib Guard Mounted-Grenadiers Regiment as an ensign in 1855. Later that year, he was enrolled in a program with a scientific emphasis at the Nikolaevskii Engineering Academy. Dukhovskoi completed his studies and was posted to an unspecified front regiment. He was awarded the rank of Lieutenant in 1859 and, after a brief reprieve from military service, enrolled at the Nicholas General Staff Academy in 1860 to pursue the “higher military sciences”. At the time of Dukhovskoi's enrollment, courses at the academy included Tactics, Military History and Strategy, Military Administration, Military Statistics, Geodesics, Mapping, Russian Language, Fortification, Artillery, Political History, Jurisprudence, Political Economics, and Military Law. A year after his arrival at the academy, he was promoted to the rank of Staff Captain.

In 1862, Dukhovskoi graduated from the Nikolaevskii Academy of the General Staff and was appointed to the General Staff of Russian forces in the Caucasus region headquartered out of Tbilisi. His first assignment was to compile a series of articles on the neighboring Dagestan Oblast. Upon his return in the fall of 1863, he joined the Dahovskii detachment in a number of military campaigns in the Kuban Oblast. This involved exploring unmapped terrains, driving out mountain peoples, and establishing Cossack stanitsas. In 1864, he was elevated to the rank of Captain of the General Staff, and in this capacity he continued to serve the regiment in operations throughout the Northern Caucasus. In recognition of his efforts on the battlefield, he was awarded the rank of Lieutenant Colonel in 1865, and two years later was made a Colonel. He remained in the region, serving the Russian army in a variety of capacities at the Clerical Office of the Kuban Oblast and then the Caucasus Military District in Tbilisi. His rise through the military ranks continued in 1873 when he became a General Major.

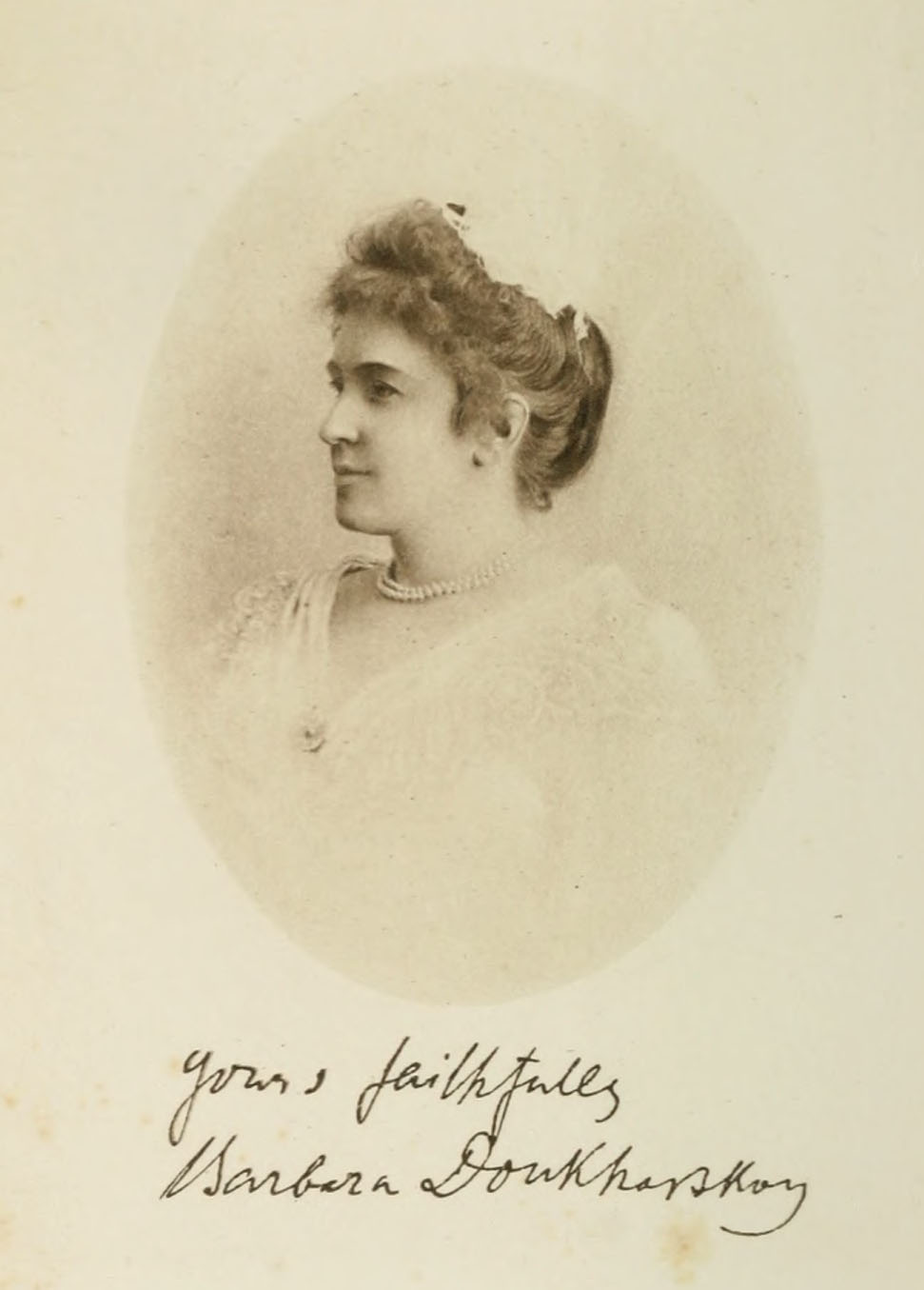
Portrait of Varvara Dukhovskai︠a︡ from the early 1900s.

On April 11, 1876, Sergei Mikhailovich Dukhovskoi married Princess Varvara Fedorovna Golitsyna (married name Varvara Dukhovskaia). She would follow him around the world, serving alongside him in positions of state.

During the Ottoman-Russian War of 1877-78, he led a maneuver against Ottoman forces in Ardagan, for which he later received the St. George Cross. He also fought in battles in Eastern Turkey at Kars, the Aladzhin Heights and Erzerum. In the aftermath of the hostilities, Dukhovskoi was appointed the head of the demarcation commission tasked to draw up new boundaries between the Ottoman and Russian empires. He was also Governor of Erzerum for a brief period of time before the Ottomans reoccupied the city. When the campaign ended in 1879, he was stationed as Chief of Staff of the Moscow Military District. In this capacity, Dukhovskoi was involved in the coronation ceremonies for Alexander III in 1883 and oversaw the training of the tsar's forces in Russia and abroad.

After being conferred the title of General-Lieutenant in 1886, Dukhovskoi oversaw maneuvers for a variety of War Districts in the empire. He was appointed to the Pri-Amur Governor-Generalship in 1893. Dukhovskoi was commander of the Russian navy in the Far East and is remembered as having done much to further both the cultural life of the region and the position of the armed forces stationed there. In May 1896, he was a participant at the coronation festivities for Tsar Nicholas II. At the end of the month, he was assigned to head the Vladivostok Military District for a three-year period. However, the assignment was ended prematurely with Dukhovskoi's appointment to the Turkestan Governorate-General on March 28, 1898 in the aftermath of the Andizhan Uprising.

The attack led by Dukchi Ishan on the Russian garrison in the Ferghana Valley was the defining event of the Governor-General's short tenure. Much of his time was spent in St. Petersburg on business matters related to the revolt. On one occasion, he remained in the capital for five months (12/16/1898-05/27/1899), followed soon after by another three-month stint. On January 1, 1901 Dukhovskoi was granted retirement. Simultaneously, he became a member of the State Council, where he served as an advisor to the tsar until he departed from Russia to recover from illness. Dukhovskoi had contracted malaria while serving in Turkestan and died on April 7, 1901. Tsar Nicholas II attended the panikhida in St. Petersburg and personally spoke with Dukhovskoi's grieving widow. The high-ranking officer was buried in the Nikolskoe Cemetery of the Alexander Nevsky Lavra. He left behind no children, and his wife Princess Barbara Golitsyn would live another thirty years, ending her days in abject poverty in the Soviet Union.
