= Mikhail Komelkov =

Soviet flying ace during World War II

- Михаил Сергеевич Комельков
- Born: 12 April 1923; Kedrovo village, Tver Governorate, RSFSR
- Died: 25 April 2003 (aged 80); Saint Petersburg, Russia
- Military career
- Allegiance: Soviet Union
- Branch: Soviet Air Force
- Service years: 1938—1961
- Rank: Colonel
- Conflicts: World War II
- Awards: Hero of the Soviet Union

Mikhail Sergeevich Komelkov (Russian: Михаил Сергеевич Комельков; 12 April 1923 — 25 April 2003) was a Soviet flying ace during World War II. At the end of the war his tally stood at 33 solo and seven shared shootdowns, for which he soon thereafter received the title Hero of the Soviet Union on 27 June 1945.

== Early life ==
Mikhail Sergeevich Komelkov was born to a peasant family on 12 April 1922 in the village of Kedrovo (now Lesnoy District, Tver Oblast). Graduating from seventh grade at the village school, he moved to Leningrad in 1937. There, he completed a year at a machine-building tekhnikum of commercial equipment and aeroclub. Conscripted into the Red Army on 5 November 1938, Komelkov graduated from the Chuguyev Military Aviation School of Pilots in February 1940. He was sent to the Western Special Military District as a junior lieutenant in the 122nd Fighter Aviation Regiment.

== World War II ==
Komelkov fought in World War II from the beginning of the war as flight leader with the 122nd Fighter Aviation Regiment, flying the I-16 and the MiG-3. Wounded in air combat in August 1941, Komelkov served as an instructor pilot with the 25th Reserve Fighter Aviation Regiment, a training unit in the Moscow Military District after his recovery. His request to return to the front was granted and he returned to combat on 16 February 1943 as a senior pilot and squadron commander with the 298th Fighter Aviation Regiment (which became the 104th Guards Fighter Aviation Regiment on 24 August). Flying the P-39 Airacobra with the 298th Fighter Aviation Regiment (later the 104th Guards Fighter Aviation Regiment), Komelkov was credited with 33 aerial victories and seven shared victories. These were accumulated during two years of combat on the Southern, 4th Ukrainian, 2nd Ukrainian, and 1st Ukrainian Fronts. He participated in the air battles over the Kuban from 17 March to June 1943. Flying three sorties in a day on 16 April, Komelkov was credited with the destruction of three German fighters that day. In total, he was credited with fifteen German aircraft destroyed during the Kuban air battles, and his actions were reported in the Soviet Air Force newspaper. In March 1945 he was appointed deputy regimental commander. By the end of the war he rose to the rank of captain and served as the deputy commander of the regiment. Having flown 321 combat sorties and participated in 75 air battles, Komelkov was awarded the title Hero of the Soviet Union and the Order of Lenin on 27 June 1945. He was also awarded the Order of the Red Banner four times, the Order of Alexander Nevsky, the Order of the Patriotic War, 1st class, twice, and the Order of the Red Star.

== Postwar ==
After the end of the war, Komelkov continued to serve in the Soviet Air Force. He graduated from the Air Force Academy in 1956, serving in different positions and participating in the training of kosmonauts Vladimir Shatalov and Andriyan Nikolayev. Retiring from the military as a colonel on 13 February 1961, Komelkov lived in Leningrad. Before his retirement, he worked at a research institute. Komelkov died on 25 April 2003 and was buried at the Nikolskoe Cemetery.
