= VSKhSON =

Underground anti-Soviet organization in USSR

All-Russian Social-Christian Union for the Liberation of the People
- Всероссийский социал-христианский союз освобождения народа
- Other name: VSKhSON
- Leader: Igor Ogurtsov
- Founded: February 1964
- Dissolved: 1967
- Country: Soviet Union
- Headquarters: Leningrad

The All-Russian Social-Christian Union for the Liberation of the People (Russian: Всероссийский социал-христианский союз освобождения народа, romanized: Vserossiyskiy sotsial-khristianskiy soyuz osvobozhdeniya naroda), commonly known by the acronym VSKhSON (ВСХСОН), was an underground anti-Soviet organization operated in the Soviet Union between 1964 and 1967. The Union was founded by Leningrad State University alumni in February 1964, and counted 28 members and 30 candidates.

VSKhSON ideology was named "Social Christianity", being opposed to both communism and capitalism. It was aimed to project Christian ethics on a reformed social and economical structure of Soviet society. In order to achieve that goal, it was supposed to create the Supreme Council with the right to veto any government initiative, which should consist of one-third of members of the highest Russian Orthodox hierarchy, and two-thirds of life "outstanding representatives of the nation", while the head of the proposed "Christian state" should be elected by the Supreme Council, then approved by the public vote.

VSKhSON members stood for "the abolition of Soviet totalitarianism" and the resurrection of a "healthy balance between the individual, society, and government", and the resurrection of the individual (versus Soviet collectivism). As compared to other secret youth organizations of the 1960s–early 1970s, the bylaws of VSKhSON had stated that every member of the organization "is not only a propagandist and organizer, but a soldier". In many ways the organization can be compared to the white émigré National Alliance of Russian Solidarists.

In February 1967, after being denounced by an informant, the organization was designated as terrorist by the KGB. Twenty one of the organization's members were put on trial and received long terms of internment. Co-founder Igor Ogurtsov was sentenced to seven years of imprisonment, eight years of labor camps and five years of exile. After returning to Russia in 1992 from exile in Germany, Ogurtsov continued a life of political activism.

The organization's founders, Igor Ogurtsov, Yevgeny Vagin, Mikhail Sado and Boris Averichkin, have not been rehabilitated. The Presidium of the Supreme Court of Russia affirmed the validity of the guilty verdict and sentence of VSKhSON members on 20 November 1996.
