= Fyodor Koni =

Russian dramatist and writer (1809–1879)

- Фёдор Кони
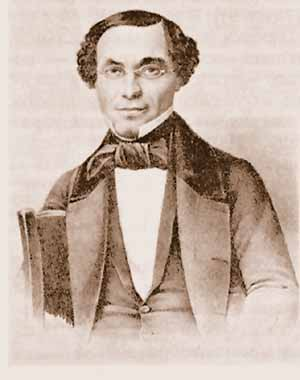
- Born: March 21, 1809; Moscow, Russian Empire
- Died: February 6, 1879 (aged 69); Saint Petersburg, Russian Empire
- Occupations: Dramatist; critic; literary historian; memoirist
- Spouse: Irina Koni
- Children: Anatoly Koni

Fyodor Alexeyevich Koni (Russian: Фёдор Алексе́евич Ко́ни; 21 March 1809 in Moscow, Russian Empire – 6 February 1879 in Saint Petersburg, Russian Empire) was a Russian dramatist, theatre critic and literary historian, editor and memoirist. Lawyer, author and politician Anatoly Koni (1844–1927) was Fyodor Koni's son.

== Biography ==
A Moscow University graduate, Koni first came to attention in the 1830s as an author of vaudevilles (The Hussar Girl, Flats of Petersburg, Husband in a Fireplace, among them). In 1840 Koni founded and became the editor of the Pantheon magazine (which later merged with another publication and changed its name to Repertoire and Pantheon). His epic monograph "The Life of Friedrich the Great" came out in 1863 and earned him a Doctor of Philosophy degree at the University of Jena. The Works of F. A. Koni (compiled of plays only), came out in 1871. Fyodor Koni died in 1879 in Saint Petersburg and was buried at the Nikolskoe Cemetery of the Alexander Nevsky Lavra.
