= Anatoly Koni =

Russian jurist and politician (1844–1927)

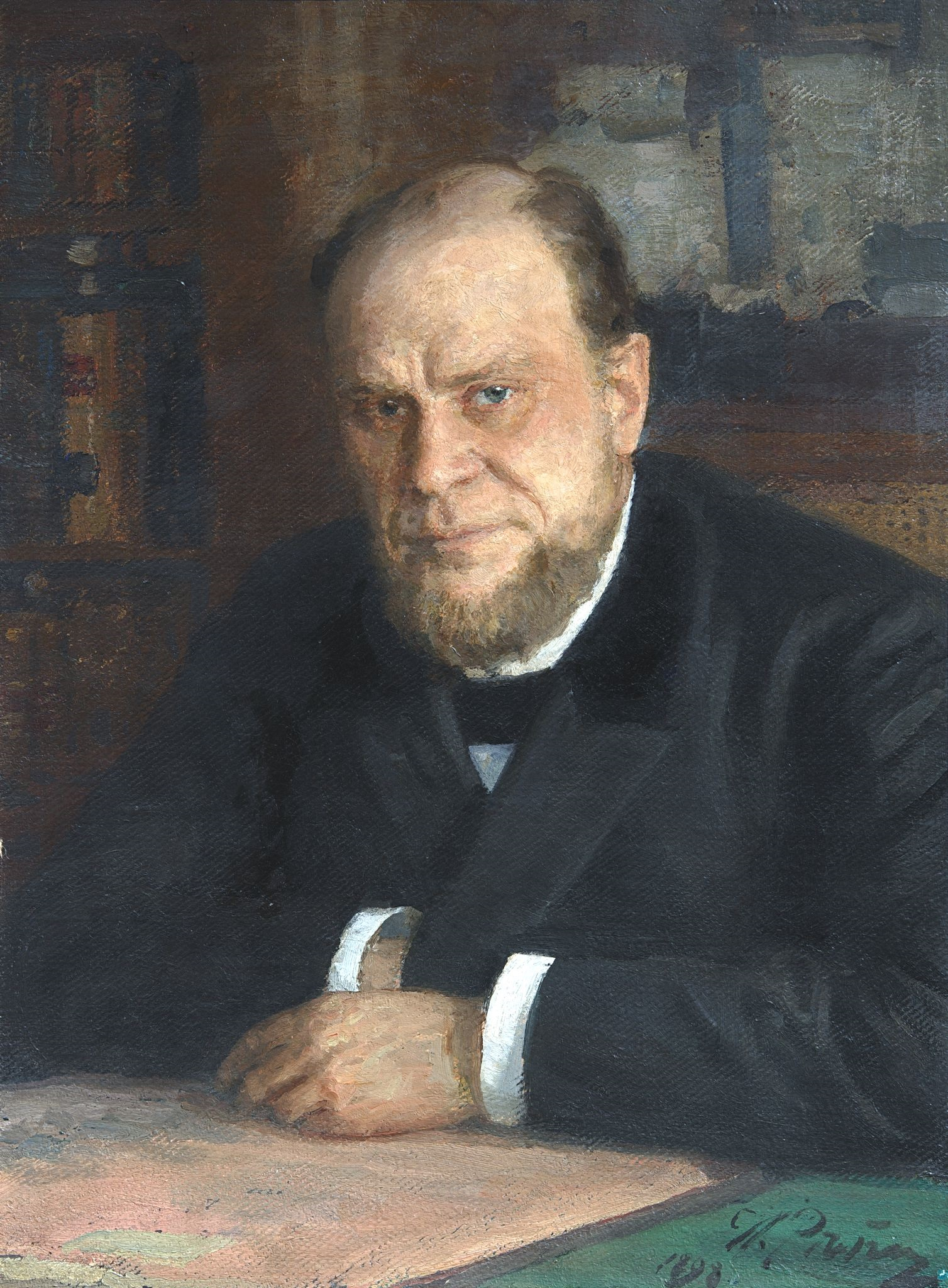
Anatoly Koni, painted in 1898 by Ilya Repin

Anatoly Fedorovich Koni (Russian: Анато́лий Фёдорович Ко́ни; 9 February 1844 – 17 September 1927) was a Russian jurist, judge, politician and writer. He was the most politically influential jurist of the late Russian Empire and a leading Russian liberal.

Anatoly Koni was the son of the noted dramatist Fyodor Koni. Among the public offices Koni held was prosecutor at the district court of Kharkov since 1867, vice director of the Ministry of Justice since 1875, presiding judge of the district court of Saint Petersburg since 1878, and member of the State Council since 1907. He taught at the Imperial School of Law and at the University of Saint Petersburg.

Koni led the investigation into the 1888 Borki train disaster and presided over the 1878 jury trial against the revolutionary and attempted assassin Vera Zasulich. As a jurist, Koni was instrumental in liberalizing Russian criminal law, notably in the form of the revised criminal code of 1903. As a member of several reform commissions, he defended judicial independence and the trial by jury. Due to his influence, prison sentences were reduced and special establishments for juvenile criminals were introduced towards the end of the 19th century. While he supported the liberals' call for a constitutional order in Russia, he declined an appointment as Minister of Justice in the government of Pyotr Stolypin in 1906.

Koni was a member of the State Council of the Russian Empire from 1907 to 1917. After the October Revolution which abolished the State Council, Koni was dismissed from his position.

After reconciling with the new Soviet government, Koni became a professor at the Petrograd University from 1918 and 1922. He also gave many public lectures until his retirement.

As a writer, Koni composed poems, works of literary criticism and multiple volumes of memoirs.

== Sources ==
- Балышев М.А., Шандула А.О. Анатолий Федорович Кони и харьковчане (2007). UNIVERSITATES. Наука и Просвещение. 2007. №3. С. 26-36.
