= Vasily Minakov =

Soviet naval pilot (1921–2016)

- Born: Vasily Ivanovich Minakov; 7 February 1921; Mineralnye Vody, USSR
- Died: 8 December 2016 (aged 95) Saint-Petersburg, Russia
- Service years: 1938—1985
- Awards: Hero of the Soviet Union

Vasily Ivanovich Minakov (Russian: Васи́лий Ива́нович Минако́в; 7 February 1921 — 8 October 2016) was a Soviet naval pilot who was awarded the title Hero of the Soviet Union during World War II. After the conflict he remained in the military, reaching the rank major-general.

As a member of the Komsomol since 1938, he joined the Communist Party 1943.

After graduating from the Military Academy of the General Staff of the Armed Forces of Russia in 1961, he became Chief of Staff First Deputy Commander of the Air Force of the Northern Fleet.

In the 1960s he spent several years in the United Arab Republic, where he helped organize the Egyptian naval aviation.

In February 1971, Minakov was appointed head of the branch of the 30th Central Scientific Research Institute, Ministry of Defence in Leningrad, where he directed the development of aviation equipment, in particular, 5 types of aircraft and 7 types of helicopters. In 1974 he was awarded the academic degree of candidate of naval sciences; has the academic title of associate professor.

He retired in 1985. He lived in Vyborgsky District, Saint Petersburg. He died on 8 October 2016 and was buried in the Nikolskoe Cemetery.
