= Abrek Barsht =

Russian Jewish pilot, Hero of the Soviet Union

Abrek Arkadyevich Barsht (Russian: Абрек Аркадьевич Баршт; 2 December 1919 — 21 March 2006) was a Soviet combat pilot, World War II veteran, colonel and Hero of the Soviet Union.

He was born 2 December 1919 in present-day Kherson to a working-class Jewish family. He graduated from the Bataysk Military Aviation School in 1940. During the war he served in the 179th Fighter Aviation Regiment and 118th Special Reconnaissance-spotter Aviation Regiment. He was awarded Hero of the Soviet Union on 10 April 1945. He died on 21 March 2006 and was buried at the Nikolskoe Cemetery in St. Petersburg.
