= Nikolay Ivanovich Rodin =

Soviet Air Force colonel

- Николай Иванович Родин
- Born: 23 April 1923; Orlovka village, Yeletsky Uyezd, Oryol Governorate, RSFSR, Soviet Union
- Died: 31 October 2002 (aged 79); St. Petersburg, Russia
- Military career
- Allegiance: Soviet Union
- Branch: Soviet Air Force
- Service years: 1940–1978
- Rank: Colonel
- Units: 525th Attack Aviation Regiment, 227th Assault Aviation Division
- Conflicts: World War II; Lvov-Sandomierz Offensive; Battle of Dukla Pass; Prague Offensive
- Awards: Hero of the Soviet Union; Order of Lenin; Order of the Red Banner (2x); Order of Alexander Nevsky; Order of the Patriotic War, 1st class (2x); Order of the Patriotic War, 2nd class; Order of the Red Star (2x); Medal for Battle Merit

Nikolay Ivanovich Rodin (Russian: Николай Иванович Родин; 23 April 1923 – 31 October 2002) was a Soviet Air Force colonel and Hero of the Soviet Union. Rodin was awarded the title for reportedly making 110 attack sorties in World War II between November 1943 and April 1945. Postwar, he continued to serve in the Soviet Air Force before a 1978 retirement. Rodin lived in Leningrad/St. Petersburg and died in 2002.

== Early life ==
Rodin was born on 23 April 1923 in Orlovka village in Oryol Governorate to a peasant family. In 1928, he moved with his mother and brother to Voronezh. He graduated from 9th grade and the Voronezh flying club in 1940. In 1940, he was drafted into the Red Army and enrolled in the Balashov Military Aviation School.

== World War II ==
The school was evacuated to Slavgorod in 1942. On 13 May 1943, Rodin graduated from the Balashov Military Aviation School. Rodin joined the Communist Party of the Soviet Union around this time. After graduating, he was sent to a 20-day training course on the Ilyushin Il-2 at Shchyolkovo. In June, he was sent to the 525th Attack Aviation Regiment of the 227th Assault Aviation Division at Gari. In October, the regiment along with Rodin was sent to the front.

Rodin fought in the Zhitomir–Berdichev Offensive during December 1943 and January 1944. In January and February, he participated in the Battle of the Korsun–Cherkassy Pocket. On 6 January, Rodin's squadron bombed the Vinnytsia airfield and Rodin reportedly downed a Messerschmitt Bf 110. On 7 January, Rodin destroyed an anti-aircraft battery during a raid on Shepetivka station. On 7 February, Rodin was awarded the Order of the Patriotic War 1st class for his actions. He was awarded the Order of the Red Banner for his actions on 22 February.

In March and April, he fought in the Dnieper–Carpathian Offensive. During the summer of 1944, he fought in the Lvov–Sandomierz Offensive. On 12 August, he was awarded a second Order of the Red Banner. In October, he participated in the Battle of the Dukla Pass. In January 1945, he fought in the West Carpathian Offensive. On 17 January, he was awarded the Order of Alexander Nevsky. From March to May, Rodin flew sorties during the Moravian-Ostrava Offensive. In March, Rodin led ten Il-2s in a ground attack supporting troops of the 38th Army. In the attack, the Il-2s reportedly destroyed two German artillery batteries and several anti-aircraft guns, twelve vehicles and a number of railway cars. By April 1945, he was deputy squadron commander. Rodin had reportedly made 110 attack sorties, destroying five enemy aircraft on the ground and shooting down one in the air. In May, he fought in the Prague Offensive. On 9 June, he was awarded the Order of the Patriotic War 2nd class. On 29 June 1945, Rodin was awarded the title Hero of the Soviet Union and the Order of Lenin for his actions.

== Postwar ==
After the end of the war, Rodin continued to serve in the Soviet Air Force. In 1955, he graduated from the Air Force Academy. He commanded a fighter aviation regiment in the Belorussian Military District from November 1955 to April 1959. In 1964, he graduated from the officers' improvement courses (KUOS). He became the chief of the political department at the Kharkov Higher Military Aviation Pilot School. Rodin then was deputy head of the faculty of the S.M. Kirov Military Medical Academy. Rodin retired in 1978 with the rank of Colonel. He lived and worked in Leningrad (St. Petersburg from 1991). On 6 April 1985 he was awarded the Order of the Patriotic War 1st class a second time on the 40th anniversary of the end of World War II. Rodin died on 31 October 2002 and was buried at the Nikolskoe Cemetery of the Alexander Nevsky Lavra.
