= Aleksey Mazurenko =

Commander of the 7th guards assault aviation regiment

Aleksey Yefimovich Mazurenko
- Алексе́й Ефи́мович Мазуре́нко
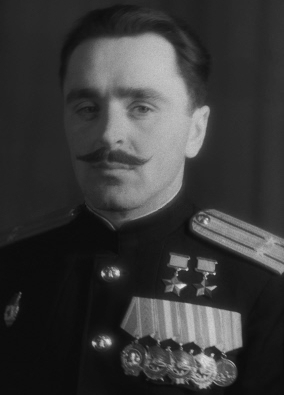
- Born: 20 June [O.S. 7 June] 1917; Yelisavetgrad, Kherson Governorate, Russian Empire
- Died: 11 March 2004; Saint Petersburg, Russia
- Military career
- Allegiance: Soviet Union
- Branch: Soviet Air Force
- Rank: General-major of Aviation
- Commands: 7th Guards Assault Aviation Regiment
- Conflicts: World War II
- Awards: Hero of the Soviet Union (twice)

Aleksey Yefimovich Mazurenko (Russian: Алексе́й Ефи́мович Мазуре́нко; 20 June [O.S. 7 June] 1917 – 11 March 2004) was the commander of the 7th Guards Assault Aviation Regiment in the Black Sea Fleet during World War II. He was twice awarded the title Hero of the Soviet Union during the war and remained in the military afterwards, reaching the rank of General-major.

== Early life ==
Mazurenko was born on 20 June [O.S. 7 June] 1917 on a farm in Yelisavetgrad to a Ukrainian family. For most of his upbringing he lived in Shakhty, Rostov oblast, where after completing his seventh grade of school in 1933 he was employed as a tram driver and later as an electrician at a mine. Before graduating from the Shakhty aeroclub in 1938 and entering the military in October that year, he trained at a glider school. After graduating from the Yeisk Naval Aviation School in December 1940 he was assigned to the 1st Mine-Torpedo Aviation Regiment, which flew the DB-3F and was part of the Baltic Fleet. He became a member of the Communist Party in 1942.

== World War II ==
From June to August 1941 Mazurenko flew 20 sorties in the DB-3F with the 1st Mine-Torpedo Regiment before he was transferred to the 71st Baltic Fleet Aviation Regiment. However, he soon switched to the 57th Baltic Fleet Regiment in October, which used the Il-2 and I-153. By 28 December 1941 he had flown 43 sorties in the Il-2 during the Battle of Leningrad, taking out 10 tanks and over a dozen anti-aircraft guns in addition to a large quantity of enemy equipment; for this he was nominated for the title Hero of the Soviet Union along with several of his colleagues, but the nomination was not initially approved. On 23 June 1942 the Baltic Fleet requested that Mazurenko's nomination be approved. The telegram was ignored until early August, but in the end the award was approved and he received the title in October. Before receiving the title he had entered staff general improvement course at the Yeisk Naval Aviation School, which he completed in January 1943. He was then made a flight inspector in the directorate of combat training of naval aviation, a position he held for one year.

When he was assigned to the Northern Fleet, he trained 32 pilots in addition to flying in combat. In June he flew five sorties, sinking a transport and a minesweeper in the Barents Sea. Later that year he was sent to the Black Sea Fleet, during which he gained two personal and nine shared sinkings of enemy vessels. In early 1944 he became commander of the 7th Guards Assault Aviation Regiment; there, despite his high position, he routinely flew sorties on an Il-2, and by 17 August 1944 he was nominated to receive a second gold star for flying 202 missions. During his tenure he sank multiple large vessels and many smaller ones; on 23 March 1944 while leading a group of seven aircraft he sank a ship with a displacement of 1,500 tons. On 16 May 1944 he led a formation of 22 planes in an attack that resulted in damage to one ship and the sinking of five more. On 18 June 1944, while leading a group of thirteen planes in an attack, he dropped two FAB-250 on a vessel with a displacement of 2,000 tons, causing the transport to burn all day.

After receiving the title Hero of the Soviet Union for a second time he continued to fly in combat, totaling 257 combat missions by the end of the war (217 in the Il-2, 20 in the DB-3F, and 20 in the I-153). Less than a week before the capitulation of Germany he sank a ship in Pomeranian Bay with a displacement of 8,000 tons. The pilots in the regiment under his command flew over 3,000 missions, resulting in the sinking of 152 enemy vessels, the shooting down of 24 aircraft, the destruction of 36 tanks and hundreds of vehicles, and the killing of many enemy personnel.

== Postwar ==
Until December 1946 Mazurenko continued to command his regiment. From then until June 1947 he commanded the 60th Assault Aviation Regiment, after which he became deputy commander of the 15th Mixed Aviation Division; he left the position at the end of 1948. In 1949 he was promoted to the rank of colonel and graduated from the Higher Officers Flight Tactical Courses of Naval Aviation, and in 1952 he graduated from the Kuznetsov Naval Academy in Leningrad. From then until November 1953 he commanded the 24th Guards Fighter Aviation Division, after which he was posted to the 601st Assault Aviation Division until November 1954. He then transferred to Marine Scientific and Technical Committee of the Navy, where he remained until 1961 when he was given a command post again - the 25th Training Squadron of the Pacific Fleet. There, he was promoted to the rank of general-major the next year. In 1964 he headed a department at the Leningrad Higher Naval Engineering School, where he remained until 1969 when he was made deputy head of material and technical supply for a naval academy. He left the military in 1972, died in Saint Petersburg on 11 March 2004 and was buried in the Nikolskoe Cemetery.

== Awards and honors ==
Soviet

- Two Hero of the Soviet Unions (23 October 1942 and 5 May 1944)
- Order of Lenin (23 October 1942)
- Three Order of the Red Banners (24 November 1941, 9 June 1942, and 22 June 1944)
- Order of Ushakov 2nd class (17 May 1945)
- Two Order of the Patriotic Wars, 1st class (10 September 1943 and 11 March 1985)
- Order of the Red Star (3 November 1953)

Other States

- Russia - Order of Honour (6 August 1997)
- Russia - Honorary Citizen of St. Petersburg (1999)
- Ukraine - Order For Courage 3rd class (15 May 2003)
