= Alexander Lopukhin =

Russian Orthodox church writer, translator, biblical scholar, theologian

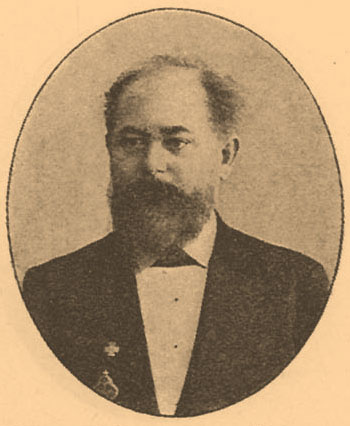
Aleksandr Lopukhin

Aleksandr Pavlovich Lopukhin (Saratov Governorate, 10 October 1852 – Saint Petersburg, 1904) (Alexei Lopukhin) was a Russian Orthodox Bible commentator best known for the Lopukhin Bible (1904).

Lopukhin was born in Saratov. He studied at the Saint Petersburg Theological Academy, graduating in 1878. From 1879-1881 he went to America as a clergyman at the church attached to the Russian embassy in New York. Returning to St. Petersburg, he was professor of comparative theology from 1883–1885, and then of ancient history from 1885-1904. His main work, the Lopukhin Bible, a three-volume Bible with commentary, was published in 1904.

He is buried at the Nikolskoe Cemetery of Alexander Nevsky Lavra.

In 1988, at the request of Metropolitan Filaret of Minsk, the Russian Orthodox Church received 100,000 Ukrainian Bibles and 150,000 copies of the Lopukhin Bible, nearly doubling the number of Bibles held by the church.
