= Mikhail Malofeyev =

Russian Major general

Mikhail Yuryevich Malofeyev
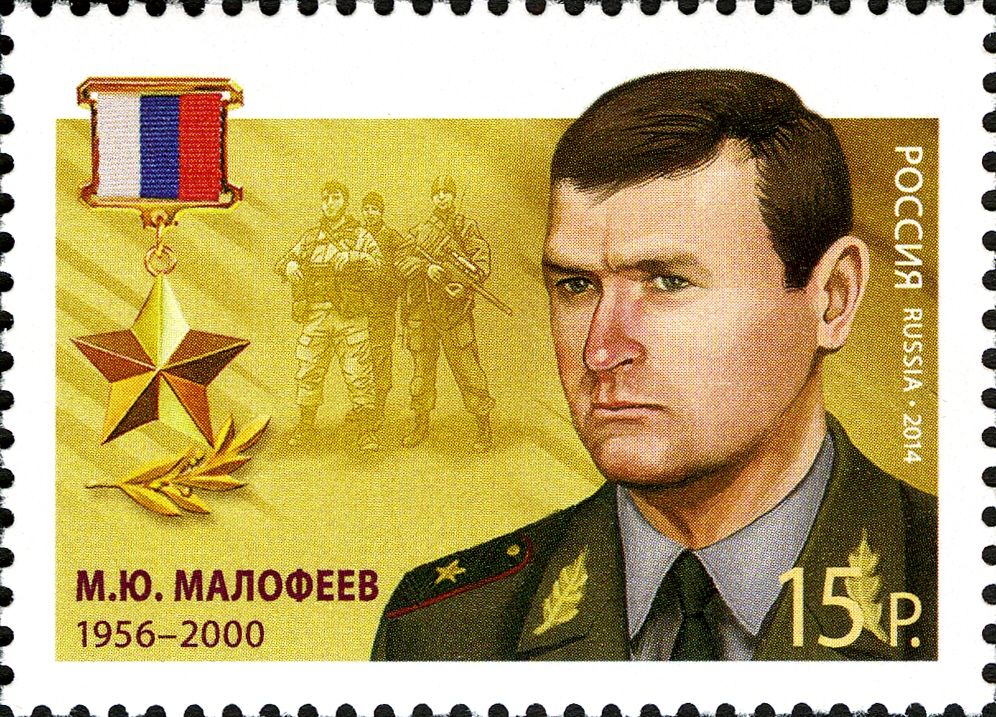
- 2014 postage stamp depicting Malofeyev
- Born: 25 May 1956; Nakhodka, Primorsky Krai, Russian SFSR, Soviet Union
- Died: 18 January 2000 (aged 43) Grozny, Chechnya
- Buried: Nikolskoe Cemetery
- Allegiance: Soviet Union; Russia
- Branch: Soviet Army; Russian Ground Forces
- Service years: 1973–2000
- Rank: Major general
- Commands: 138th Separate Guards Motor Rifle Brigade
- Conflicts: First Chechen War; Second Chechen War; Battle of Grozny
- Awards: Hero of the Russian Federation

Mikhail Yuryevich Malofeyev (Russian: Михаил Юрьевич Малофеев) (25 May 1956 – 18 January 2000) was a Russian major general who served in the Russian Ground Forces from 1977 until his death. Initially serving as a platoon commander under the Group of Soviet Forces in Germany, he served in multiple military districts and theatres including service in the First Chechen War, rising through the ranks before becoming a major general in June 1999 and deputy chief of the Combat Training Directorate of the Leningrad Military District a month later.

He was transferred to the North Caucasus in the leadup to the Second Chechen War between October and November 1999, becoming deputy commander of the northern front during the conflict. During the Battle of Grozny, he went missing in the west of the city on 18 January, 2000. The reporting of his disappearance and ultimate fate was conflicted, including claims of his capture and interrogation by Chechen rebels.

Following several days of fighting to retake the area of his disappearance, his body was located and recovered on 23 January, after which he was transported to Vladikavkaz and then Saint Petersburg, with memorial services taking place at both. He was then buried at Nikolskoe Cemetery with full military honors on 28 January. He was posthumously awarded the title Hero of the Russian Federation on 9 February, which was presented to his wife, Svetlana Malofeyeva, at a ceremony in the Grand Kremlin Palace on 23 February.

== Early life and military career ==
Mikhail Yuryevich Malofeyev was born on 25 May 1956 in Nakhodka, Primorsky Krai, Russia, where his parents had been assigned to work as specialists following graduation from college. His father worked in the shipbuilding industry while his mother was a pediatrician. Following the passage of a law allowing specialists to return to their hometowns, his family returned to Lomonosov, Leningrad Oblast in 1957. Inspired by the example of his grandfather and great-grandfather, he decided to pursue a military career in ninth grade. In 1973, on his completion of secondary school, Malofeyev entered the Leningrad Kirov Higher Combined Arms Command School, from which he graduated in 1977.

Initially posted to the Group of Soviet Forces in Germany, he served as a platoon commander in the 174th Guards Motor Rifle Regiment of the 57th Guards Motor Rifle Division at Weißenfels. Within two years he rose to company commander and then after another two became a battalion chief of staff. That year, Malofeyev was transferred to Nakhchivan in the Transcaucasian Military District, where he served with the 367th Motor Rifle Regiment. He and his regiment were relocated to Termez in the Turkestan Military District in 1986, training conscripts for service in the Soviet–Afghan War. Selected for advanced officer training a year later, Malofeyev graduated from the Frunze Military Academy in 1989, being appointed to command a battalion in the Arctic town of Kandalaksha in the Leningrad Military District. He remained in the Arctic for the next several years, being transferred to Pechenga to serve as regimental chief of staff. There he was promoted to regimental commander.

Already a colonel, Malofeyev took command of the 134th Guards Motor Rifle Regiment of the 45th Guards Motor Rifle Division at Kamenka, Leningrad Oblast, in 1994. In the spring of 1995 he went to Chechnya as an assistant to the commander of the division's 129th Guards Motor Rifle (Peacekeeping) Regiment, deployed to take part in the First Chechen War. At this time the regiment was involved in desultory fighting on the Terek ridge. After spending several weeks there, he returned with the regiment when it was rotated out of the combat zone. Malofeyev was promoted to deputy division commander, overseeing the reorganization of the 45th Guards into the 138th Separate Guards Motor Rifle Brigade, becoming the first commander of the latter in December 1997. Under his command the 138th was evaluated as one of the best units of the Leningrad Military District. Promoted to major general in June 1999, Malofeyev became deputy chief of the Combat Training Directorate of the Leningrad Military District a month later. He was transferred to the North Caucasus between October and November 1999.

At the time of his disappearance, Malofeyev was the deputy commander of the northern front of the Russian Ground Forces in Chechnya during the Second Chechen War and head of the combat training department of the 58th Guards Combined Arms Army in the North Caucasus Military District.

== Grozny ==
=== Background ===
In August, 1999 Islamist forces invaded the Republic of Dagestan from Chechnya. A major bombing campaign on Chechnya occurred from late August to late September, resulting in the displacement of an estimated 100,000 Chechens. In a two week period in September that year, four apartment bombings occurred in the cities resulting in the deaths of 307 people. Russian authorities quickly blamed Chechnya for the bombings, despite having no evidence to support that claim or any Chechens taking responsibility for them.

On 22 September, Deputy Interior Minister lieutenant general Igor Zubov declared that approximately 30,000 Russian troops had surrounded Chechnya and were ready to invade if ordered while also ruling out an offensive at the time. On 1 October, the land war began, with Russian forces reaching the Terek River on 5 October, crossing it in mid-October and surrounding Grozny by December. Despite pledging that Russia would not storm Grozny and would avoid protracted guerrilla warfare like the First Chechen War, Russian forces assaulted Grozny and met stiff resistance from Chechen rebels, resulting in gruelling guerrilla warfare.

Using their knowledge of the city, the Chechens turned Grozny into a death-trap for the Russian forces, attacking and then disappearing into sewers and bunkers. One Russian officer said in late January that approximately 20 conscripts from a single regiment were killed by Chechens who had flanked them by using the sewer system to attack them from behind.

=== Disappearance ===
Malofeyev disappeared on the first day of a renewed Russian assault on Grozny on 16 January. One military expert claimed that it was the first instance of a Russian general going missing in action since World War II. At the time of his disappearance, a senior Russian Interior Minister was still missing somewhere in Chechnya after being kidnapped a year prior.

Initial reporting from both sides of the conflict as to his fate following his disappearance were contradictory. (Note: This is shown by the varied accounts below from both Russian and Chechen sources)

==== Chechen reporting ====
In a televised announcement on 20 January, Chechen warlord Shamil Basayev claimed that Malofeyev had been captured, stating that they had captured him while he was leading a reconnaissance patrol into Grozny on 18 January. They also stated that he was smuggled through Russian lines to a "secret location" outside of Grozny to be questioned. According to the Chechens, he had been captured when his unit was ambushed at night by Chechen fighters who had used the sewer system to reach their position. On around 22 January, Chechen commander Baudi Bakuyev stated that the Russian military would soon be receiving a video tape proving that Malofeyev was still alive.

==== Russian reporting ====
The Russian Ministry of Defence failed to acknowledge Malofeyev's disappearance until after the announcement from Basayev, stating that he had been missing since 18 January. According to one account, he was with the 245th Motorized Infantry Regiment on the western outskirts of Grozny and was sheltering in a building with some officers and soldiers when they were attacked, with Malofeyev failing to return. Another stated that he was shot as he attempted to rally his men.

Unnamed Russian military sources stated on 20 January that he had been wounded by sniper fire in an ambush in north-western Grozny and were not sure whether he had been killed or captured. In another version of these events, Russian media cited unnamed Russian military sources as saying that he had been shot in the head and back by snipers and killed and that, due to the intensity of the fighting in the area, they were unable to recover his body.

A statement from Itar-Tass, a state-ran news service, cited unnamed officials as saying that the claims of his capture were "a propaganda ploy.", contradicting an earlier report from them that quoted eyewitnesses as saying he had been killed by sniper fire.

The Russian government had previously claimed that Staropromyslovsky, the area he was visiting at the time, had already been captured a month prior.

== Recovery and burial ==
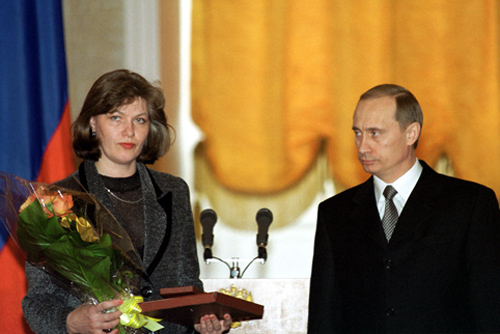
Malofeyev's wife Svetlana Malofeyeva accepting the award on behalf of her husband

It was reported that Russian special forces were searching for Malofeyev on the night of 20 January. On 24 January, Russian sources stated that they had found and recovered the body of Malofeyev the previous day, reporting that he was found in the rubble of a collapsed building, while a senior Russian official stated that he had been found in a trench near to where he led his soldiers in an attack. Kazantsev stated told Interfax "[Malofeyev] behaved as a hero and, when an assault team of the Interior [Ministry] troops tarried, led a small group forward so that the main forces could act,” and that he "was wounded in his head. The bandits opened grenade-thrower and mortar fire, and a wall collapsed over the heads of the general's group."

Russian troops fought for several days to retake the area where he had died and dug through the rubble for more than a day before locating the bodies of him and his radioman. The bodies were then flown to a military facility in Vladikavkaz late on 23 January. After memorial services in Vladikavkaz and the Military University of Signals in Saint Petersburg, held with an open casket to refute Chechen propaganda claims of his capture, Malofeyev was buried in the Nikolskoe Cemetery with full military honors on 28 January. At the funeral, attended by hundreds, Putin and Defense Minister Igor Sergeyev declared: "In order for peace to come to Chechen land, we must win." Before the casket was lowered into the grave, Putin concluded: "We have no accidental victims and useless losses. So it was also with Mikhail Malofeyev – he did not die in vain and not by accident." Malofeyev's comrades vowed to take revenge for his death: "Now, every day, we will do everything possible to make the insurgents experience for themselves the power of our weapons.

He was posthumously awarded Russia's highest honor, the title of Hero of the Russian Federation, on 9 February for "courage and heroism displayed during the liquidation of illegal armed formations in the North Caucasus." His wife, Svetlana Malofeyeva, accepted the award on his behalf in a ceremony in the Grand Kremlin Palace on 23 February. In addition to his wife, Malofeyev was survived by a son and daughter. At Putin's order, an apartment in Saint Petersburg was provided to Malofeyev's family.

== Commemoration ==
The school that Malofeyev graduated from is named in his honor, and in 2006 a memorial plaque was placed on the wall of the school. A stamp was issued by Russian Post in 2014 dedicated to Malofeyev. An electric train was named for him in 2017. In September 2020 a bust of Malofeyev was installed on the base of the 138th Guards Motor Rifle Brigade next to the building that his office was located in.
