= Mikhail Sado =

Mikhail Sado Михаил Садо
- Born: June 9, 1934
- Died: August 30, 2010 (aged 76)
- Education: Saint Petersburg University
- Scientific career
- Fields: Linguist, Scholar, Professor of Semitic languages, politician and public man

Mikhail Yukhanovich Sado (Russian: Михаил Юханович Садо, Syriac: ܡܝܟ݂ܐܝܠ ܒܝܬ ܣܗܕܐ, romanized: Mixael bit Sahda), (June 9, 1934 – August 30, 2010) was an Assyrian Russian linguist, scholar, Professor of Semitic languages, orientalist, politician, former paratrooper, and wrestling champion.

Mikhail Sado was born on June 9, 1934, in Leningrad. He was a linguist of Semitic languages and was fluent in many other Assyrian dialects. He taught Hebrew in Russian Orthodox seminaries. He obtained his doctorates in Oriental Studies at Leningrad University in 1951.

Sado was one of four principal leaders who established the Russian Social Christian Union for the Liberation of Peoples. He spent thirteen years (1967–1980) in prison during the Soviet Union because of his religious activism.

Mikhail Sado's origin goes back to Hakkari, a village of Levon north of Tiari. His father was Challo and his mother Mariam. His wife Zina was born in Moscow. She was one year old when her family was forced to leave the USSR for Iran under Stalin's order. She was raised in Iran and returned to the Soviet Union in 1962.

The Sados have two sons; his youngest son Rabban Estepanos, is the presiding priest of the oldest Russian Orthodox Church in St. Petersburg, Cathedral of The Holy Trinity of St. Alexander Nevsky Monastery built in 1703–1714. Rabban Estepanos speaks Assyrian fluently. He assisted his father in publishing a book in Russian on the life and accomplishments of the prominent Assyrians in the Soviet Union. Mikhail Sado's older son (a transportation business owner) funded this publication.

== See also ==
- Assyrians in Russia
- Assyrian Neo-Aramaic
