= Feofil Tolstoy =

Russian composer

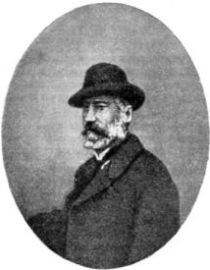
- Born: Феофил Матвеевич Толстой; 6 June 1809; Saint Petersburg, Russian Empire
- Died: 20 February 1881 (aged 71); Saint Petersburg, Russian Empire
- Occupations: composer, music critic, journalist writer
- Spouse: Alexandra Davydova (1815—1884)

Feofil Matveyevich Tolstoy (Russian: Феофил Матвеевич Толстой, 6 June 1809, Saint Petersburg, Imperial Russia, — 20 February 1881, Saint Petersburg, Imperial Russia), was a Russian composer, music critic and writer who used the pseudonym Rostislav.

Tolstoy, the son of the senator Matvey Fyodorovich Tolstoy (1772—1815) and Praskovya Mikhaylovna Kutuzova (1777—1844), the daughter of the renowned Russian Field marshal Mikhail Kutuzov, worked for the most of his life as a mid-rank level state official, linked to the Moscow and Smolensk governors' offices, as well as the Ministry of Defense. He authored more than 200 romances (including the earliest, 1829, adaptation of Pushkin's "Ya vas lyubil...", "I Loved You"), as well as two operas. The first, Birichino di Parigi (with an Italian libretto), was produced in Naples, Italy, in 1832 and in Saint Petersburg in 1835. The second, Doktor v khlopotakh (Доктор в хлопотах, Doctor in Business) was staged in 1851 in Russia.

Disillusioned with the response, Tolstoy embarked upon the career of a music critic and, contributing to Severnaya Ptchela, Golos, Moskovskiye Vedomosti and Journal de St. Petersbourg earned himself a reputation of an authority, mostly on Mikhail Glinka, Alexander Dargomyzhsky and Alexander Serov. Tolstoy wrote two short novels, Kapitan Toldi (Капитан Тольди, Sovremennik, 1852) and Bolezni voli (Болезни воли, Ailments of the Will, Russky Vestnik, 1859).

Alexandra Davydova (1815—1884), a well-known opera singer and a popular art salon hostess, was his wife.
