= Aleksandra Ishimova =

Russian writer and translator

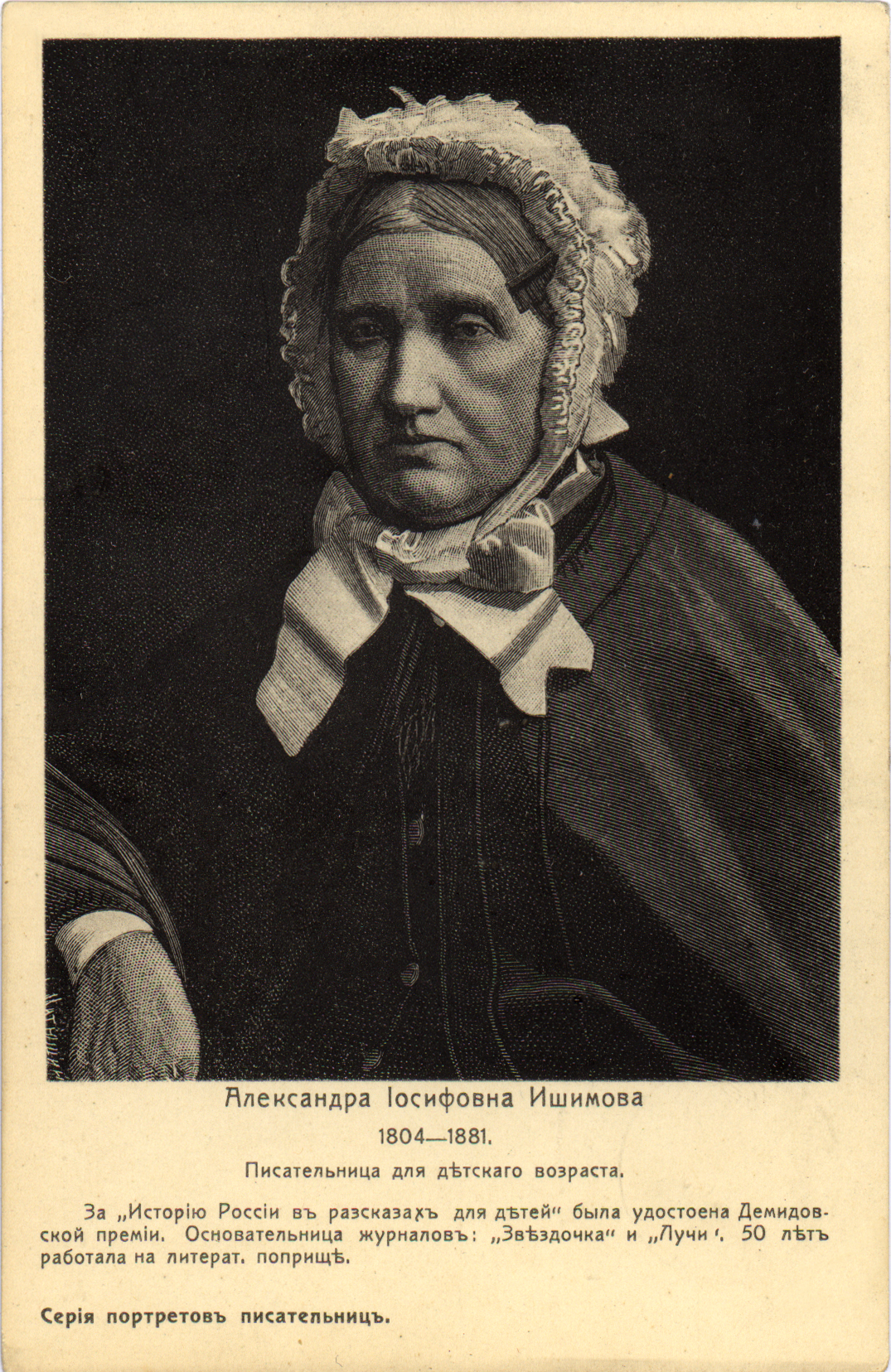
Aleksandra Ishimova

Aleksandra Ishimova (Russian: Алекса́ндра Ио́сифовна (О́сиповна) Иши́мова) (6 January 1805 [O.S. 25 December 1804] – 16 June [O.S. 4 June] 1881) – was a Russian translator, and one of the first professional Russian children's authors.

== Early life and education ==
After childhood in her birthplace of Kostroma, Aleksandra Ishimova studied in private boarding schools in Saint Petersburg. In 1818 a scandal involving her father occurred, and Ishimova left Saint Petersburg together with her family to live in the northern provinces.

== Career ==
In 1825 it was possible to return to Saint Petersburg, and to receive from Tsar Alexander I a pardon for her father. There she opened a small school and made acquaintance with Pyotr Vyazemsky, Vasily Zhukovsky and Alexander Pushkin. Ishimova was the last correspondent of Pushkin: he wrote her a letter with an enthusiastic response to her historical stories, and sent a book for translation the day of his duel with Georges-Charles de Heeckeren d'Anthès.

Ishimova published two monthly journals: Little Star («Звездочка», 1842–1863) for children, and Rays of Light («Лучи», 1850–1860) for young ladies. Her book History of Russia in Stories for Children («История России в рассказах для детей» 1841) was awarded the Demidov Prize in 1852. Aside from this she translated and printed a number of novel narratives for children, many included religious and moral education. The best known among them were «Рассказы старушки» (Saint Petersburg, 1839); «Священная истории в разговорах для маленьких детей», passing six editions beginning in 1841; «Колокольчик», (Saint Petersburg, 1849) for children in orphanages; «Первое чтение и первые уроки для детей» (Saint Petersburg, 1856–1860; two editions); and «Рассказы из Священной истории для крестьянских детей» (Saint Petersburg, 1878).

== Death ==
She died at age 76 in Saint Petersburg.
