= Ivan Podozerov =

Russian Sculptor, and Art Professor

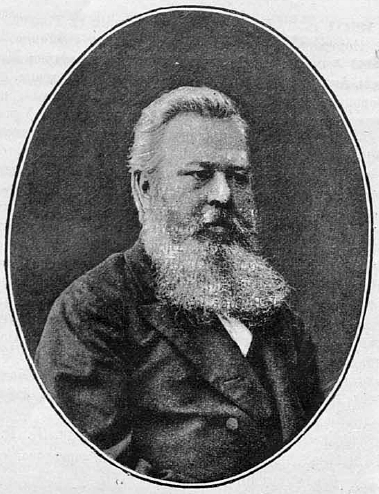
Ivan Podozerov (c. 1880)

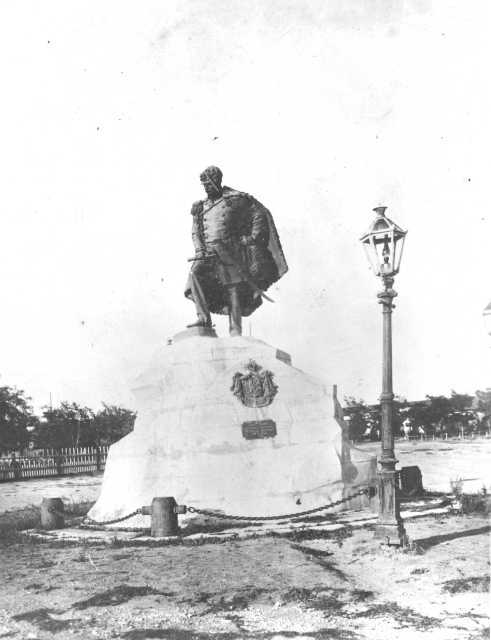
The monument to Prince Argutinsky-Dolgoruky

Ivan Ivanovich Podozerov (Russian: Иван Иванович Подозeров: 24 February 1835, Kostroma Governorate — 29 March 1899, Saint Petersburg) was a Russian sculptor and art professor.

== Biography ==
From 1856 to 1866, he attended the Imperial Academy of Arts, where his primary instructor was Nikolai Pimenov. During his time there, he received several awards, including four silver medals and a small gold medal for two statues; one depicting a mower, and one of Gaius Mucius Scaevola. He was also presented with two cash prizes.

In 1866, he graduated as an "Artist of the First-Degree". In 1868, he was named an "Academician" for a bust of his teacher, Pimenov. This was accompanied by a stipend that allowed him to travel and study abroad until 1870. Shortly after returning, he became an adjunct professor of sculpture at the Academy, and was placed in charge of the molding workshop. He was promoted to full Professor in 1881, for his statue of Eve. In 1894, when a new charter went into effect, he was dismissed "at his own request", as were several other professors.

In addition to Eve, his familiar works include a statue of Tsar Alexander II, several figures for a monument to Tsarina Catherine II that was designed by Mikhail Mikeshin, and a monument to Prince Moisey Argutinsky-Dolgoruky in Temir-Khan-Shurá, which was destroyed by the Bolsheviks in 1921.

He died in 1899 and was interred at Smolensky Cemetery. The grave has not been preserved.
