= Antonina Abarinova =

Russian opera singer

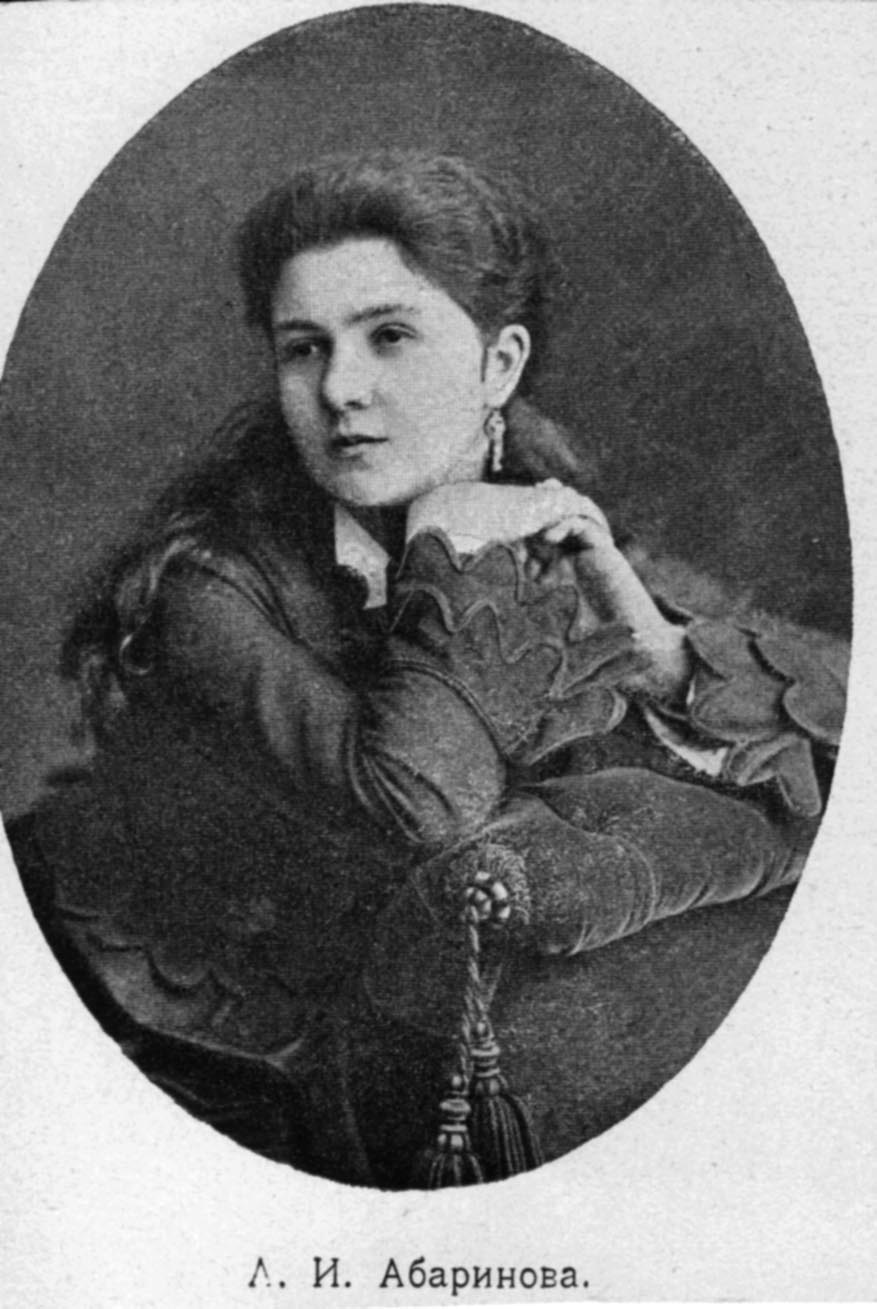
- Abarinova in 1880s
- Born: Антонина Ивановна Абаринова; 24 July 1842; Vladimir, Imperial Russia
- Died: 29 July 1901 (aged 59); Tula Governorate, Imperial Russia

Antonina Ivanovna Abarinova (Russian: Антони́на Ива́новна Аба́ринова, 24 July 1842, Vladimir – 29 July 1901, Sukhodol, Tula Governorate, Imperial Russia) was a Russian opera singer (originally contralto, later mezzo-soprano) who performed at Maryinsky Theatre, while being also an Alexandrinsky Theatre actress.

Abarinova's best-known operatic roles were as the Princess in Rusalka and Laura in The Stone Guest, both by Alexander Dargomyzhsky, as well as Spiridonova in Alexander Serov's The Power of the Fiend and Lady Pamela in Daniel Auber's Fra Diavolo. In theatre she excelled as Natalya Dmitriyevna in Alexander Griboyedov's Woe from Wit, Zvezdintseva in The Fruits of Enlightenment by Leo Tolstoy, Gurmyzhskaya in The Forest and Ogudalova in Without a Dowry, both by Aleksandr Ostrovsky. She played Polina Andreyevna in the 1896 premiere performance of Anton Chekhov's The Seagull.
