= Nestor Kotlyarevsky =

Russian author (1863–1925)

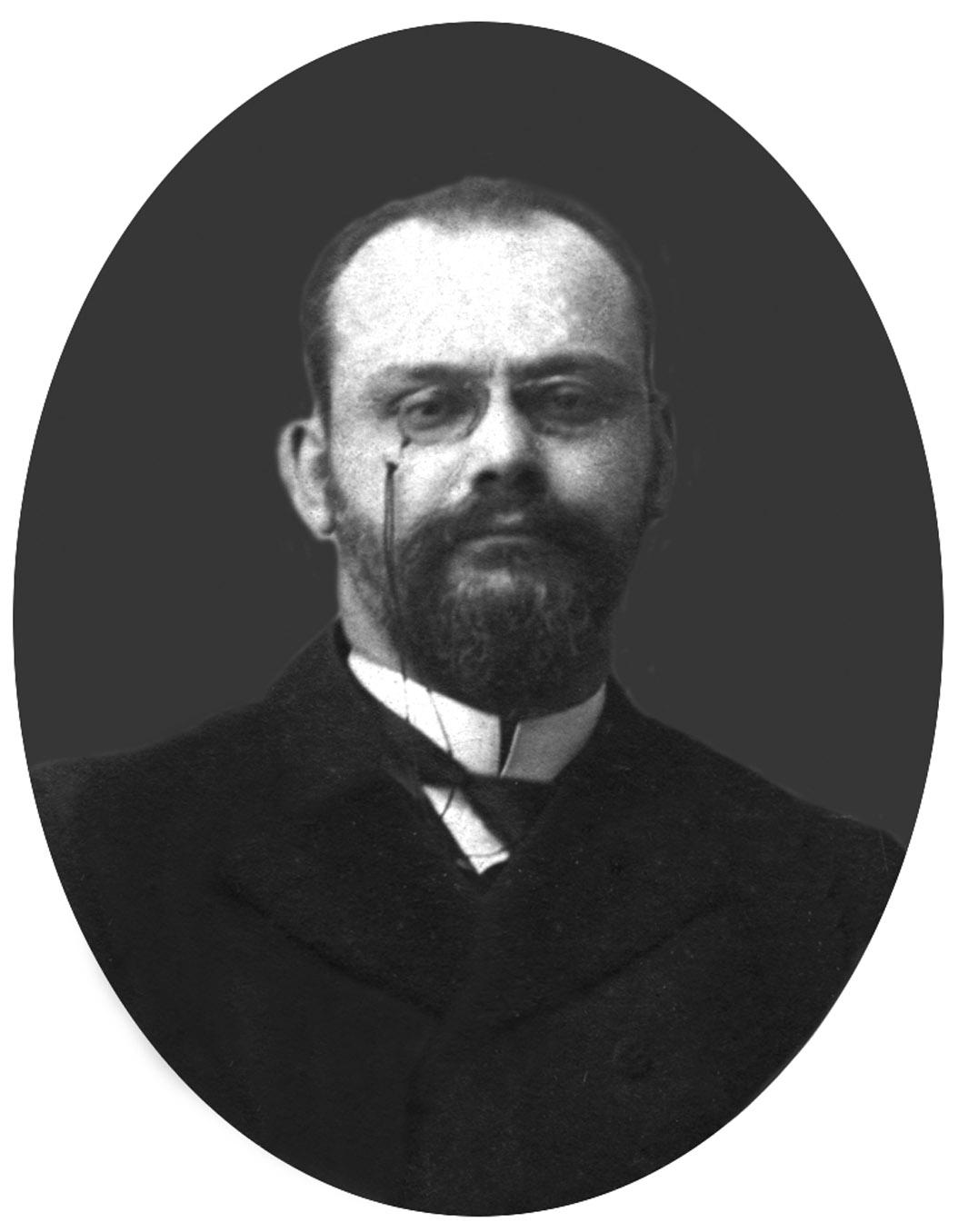
- Born: 2 February 1863; Moscow, Russian Empire
- Died: 12 May 1925 (aged 62); Leningrad, USSR

Nestor Alexandrovich Kotlyarevsky (Не′стор Алекса′ндрович Котляре′вский February 2, 1863, Moscow, Russian Empire, - May 12, 1925, Leningrad, USSR) was a Russian author, publicist, literary critic and historian. A high-profile scholar and a Russian academy honorary member (since 1906), Kotlyarevsky taught the history of literature at Moscow University, a series of his lectures served later as a foundation for one of his best known works, The Nineteenth Century (1921). Kotlyarevsky also went down in history as the first director of the Pushkin House (1910).
