= Nikolay Koksharov =

Russian mineralogist (1818–1893)

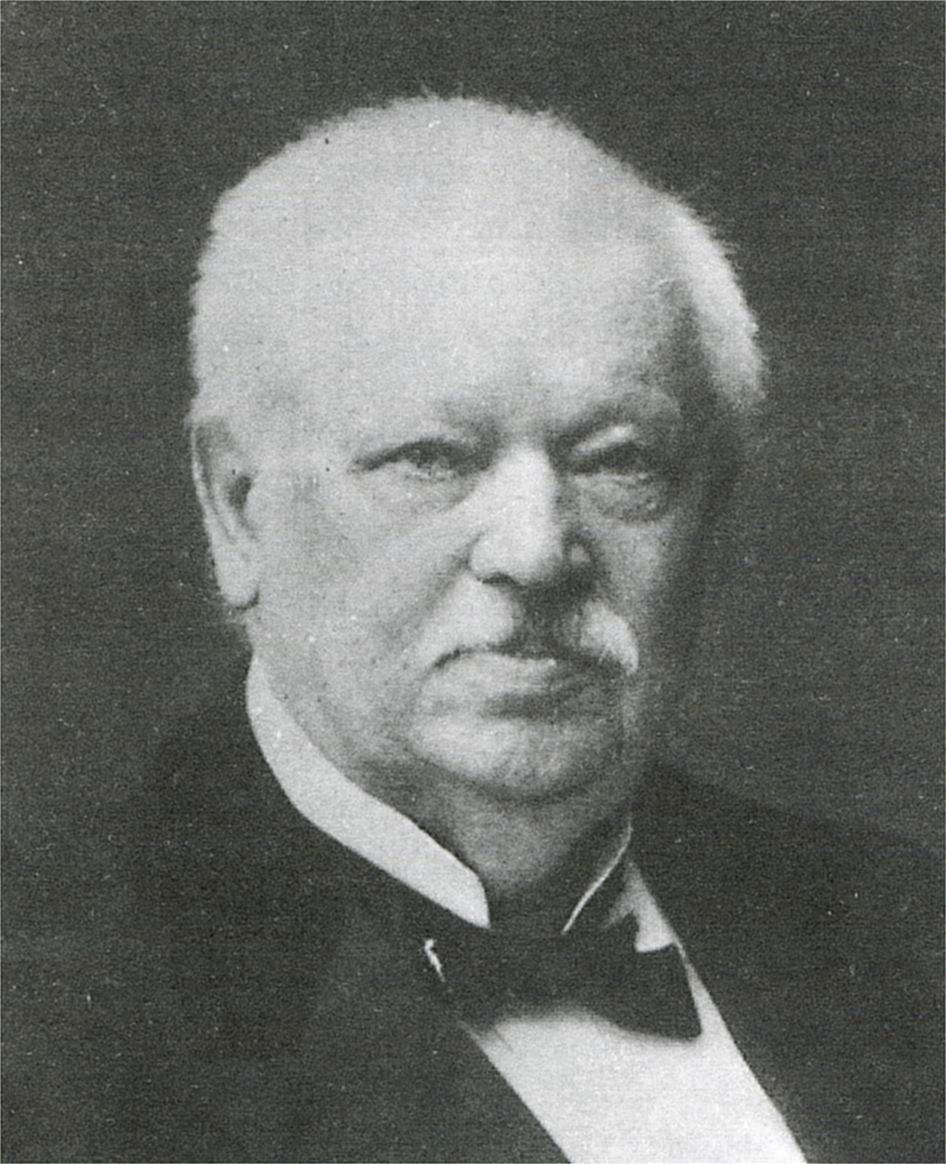
Nikolai Ivanovich Koksharov

Nikolai Ivanovich Koksharov (Russian: Николай Иванович Кокшаров) (23 November (5 December), 1818 – 21 December (2 January), 1893) was a Russian mineralogist, crystallographer, and major general in the Russian army. He was noted for his measurements of crystals using a goniometer.

== Life ==
Nikolai Koksharov was born in Ust-Kamenogorsk (today's Kazakhstan). He was educated at the military school of mines in St. Petersburg. At the age of twenty-two he was selected to accompany Roderick Murchison and Édouard de Verneuil, and afterwards Dr. Keyserling, in their geological survey of the Russian Empire. Subsequently, he devoted his attention mainly to the study of mineralogy and mining, and was appointed director of the Institute of Mines.

In 1865, he became director of the Imperial Mineralogical Society of St.Petersburg. He contributed numerous papers on euclase, zircon, epidote, orthite, monazite, and other mineralogical subjects to the St.Petersburg and Vienna academies of science, to Johann Christian Poggendorff's Annalen der Physik und Chemie, Leonhard and Browns Ja/irbuch, &c. He also issued as separate works Materialen zur Mineralogie Russlands and Vorlesungen uber Mineralogie.
