= Volodymyr Pidvysotskyi =

Ukrainian biologist (1857–1913)

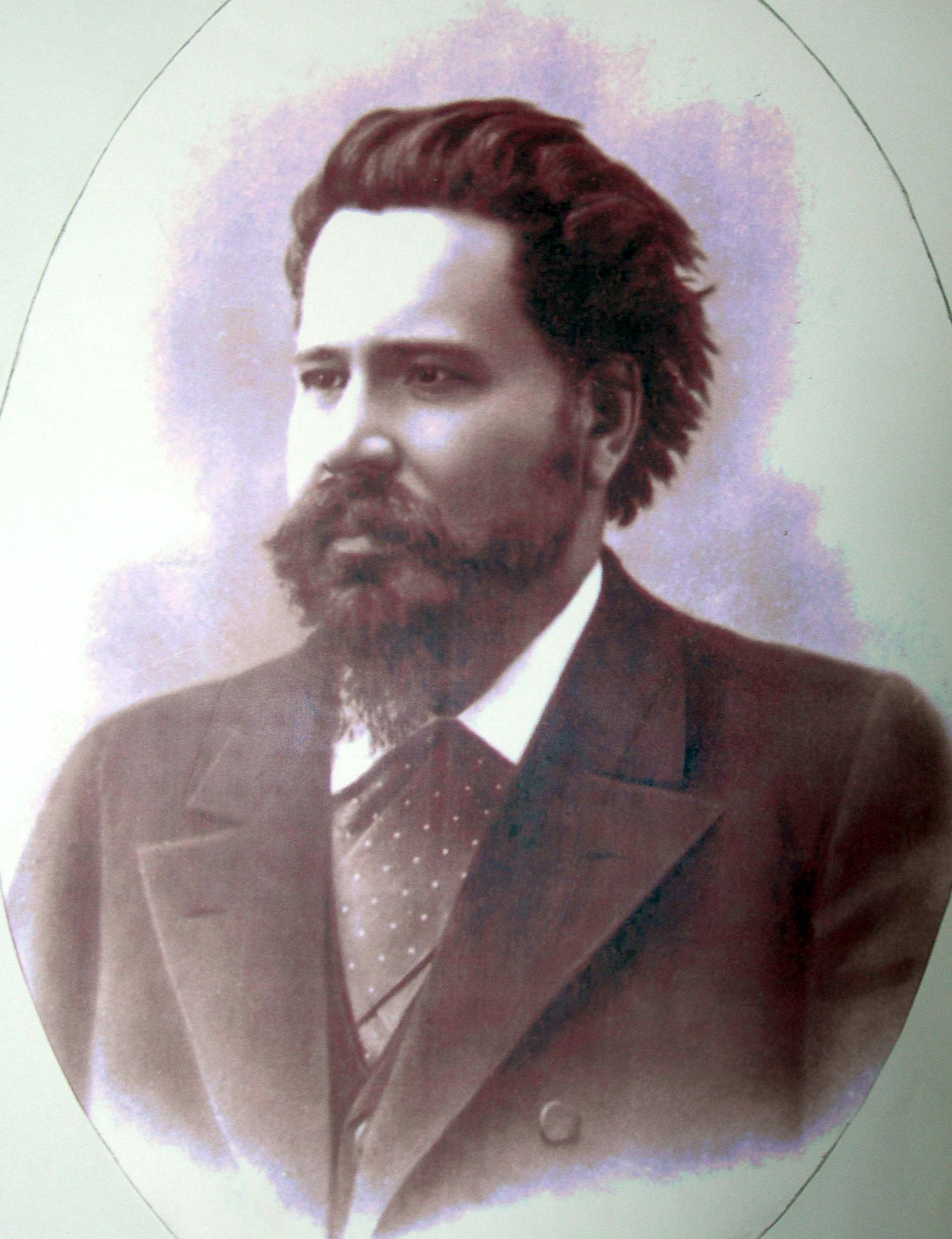

Vladimir Valerianovich Podvysotsky (Russian: Владимир Валерианович Подвысоцкий) or Volodymyr Valerianovych Pidvysotskyi (Ukrainian: Володимир Валеріанович Підвисоцький; 1857, village of Maksymivka, Borznyansky Uyezd, Chernigov Governorate — 22 January 1913, Saint Petersburg) was a Russian Empire pathologist, endocrinologist, immunologist and microbiologist.

Podvysotsky's father was Valerian Podvysotsky, a professor at the Kazan University. Vladimir attended a school in Geneva. He is considered the founder of the Kyiv school of pathology. He taught at the University of Novorossiya before moving to Saint Petersburg (1903) where he presided over the Institute of Experimental Medicine until his death.

Member of the Anatomical Society in Paris (1887). Member of the Imperial Military Medical Academy (1900). Honorary member of the Royal Institute of Experimental Therapy in Frankfurt in 1911.
