= List of compositions by Modest Mussorgsky =

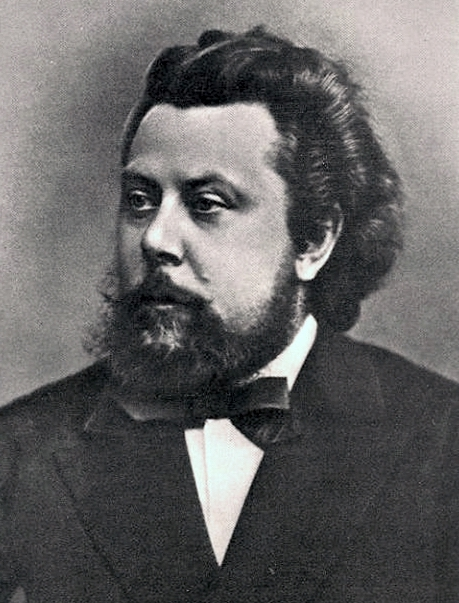
Modest Petrovich Mussorgsky, 1870

The following is a list of compositions by Modest Mussorgsky.

== Combined sortable list ==
Note: The publication date is the first known date of publication, regardless of edition or fidelity to the composer's original score.

Category	Title	Translation	Start	End	Text Basis	Status	Pub.	Publisher
Opera	Han d'Island	Hans of Iceland	1856	1856	Hugo	Projected	—	—
Opera	Эдип в Афинах	Oedipus in Athens	1858	1861	Ozerov	Unfinished	1883	
Opera	Саламбо (or Ливиец)	Salammbô (or The Libyan)	1863	1866-04-10	Flaubert	Unfinished	1939	Muzgiz
Opera	Женитьба	Marriage	1868-06-11	1868-07-08	Gogol	Unfinished	1908	Bessel
Opera	Борис Годунов	Boris Godunov	1868-10	1869-12-15	Pushkin	Initial Version	1928	Muzsektor
Opera	Бобыль	The Landless Peasant	1870	1870	Spielhagen	Projected	—	—
Opera	Борис Годунов	Boris Godunov	1871	1872-06-23	Pushkin	Revision	1874	Bessel
Opera-Ballet	Млада	Mlada	1872	1872	Krïlov	Unfinished	1931	Muzgiz
Opera	Хованщина	Khovanshchina	1872-06	1880	Mussorgsky	Unfinished	1883	Bessel
Opera	Сорочинская ярмарка	The Fair at Sorochyntsi	1874	1880	Gogol	Unfinished	1916	Bessel
Opera	Пугачёвщина	Pugachovshchina	1877	1877	Pushkin	Projected	—	—
Orchestra	Скерцо B-dur	Scherzo in B♭ major	1858	1858	—	Orchestration	1883	Bessel
Orchestra	Alla marcia notturna	Alla marcia notturna (like a nocturnal march)	1861	1861	—	—		
Orchestra	Симфония D-dur	Symphony in D major	1861	1862	—	Lost	—	—
Orchestra	Иванова ночь на лысой горе	Night on Bald Mountain	1866	1867	—		1968	
Orchestra	Intermezzo symphonique in modo classico	Symphonic Intermezzo in the Classic Style	1867	1867	—	Revision	1883	Bessel
Orchestra	Подибрад чешский	Podebrad of Bohemia	1867	1867	—	Projected	—	—
Orchestra	Взятие Карса	The Capture of Kars	1880	1880	—		1883	Bessel
Orchestra	Большая сюита на среднеазиатские темы	Grand Suite on Central Asian Themes (Transcaucasian Suite)	1880	1880	—	Projected	—	—
Piano	Полька "Подпрапорщик"	Porte-enseigne (Polka)	1852	1852	—		1852	Bernard
Piano	Souvenir d'Enfance	Souvenir of Childhood	1857	1857	—		1911	Bessel
Piano	Соната Es-dur	Sonata in E♭ major	1858	1858	—	Lost	—	—
Piano	Соната fis-moll	Sonata in F♯ minor	1858	1858	—	Lost	—	—
Piano	Скерцо cis-moll	Scherzo in C♯ minor	1858	1858	—	Initial Version	1911	Bessel
Piano	Скерцо cis-moll	Scherzo in C♯ minor	1858	1858	—	Revision	1939	Muzgiz
Piano	Скерцо B-dur	Scherzo in B♭ major	1858	1858	—			
Piano Duet	Персидский хор из оперы "Руслан и Людмила"	Persian Chorus from the Opera Ruslan and Lyudmila	1858	1858	—	Arrangement (Glinka)		
Piano Duet	Souvenir d'une nuit d'été à Madrid	Souvenir of a Summer Night in Madrid	1858	1858	—	Arrangement (Glinka)		
Piano	Импровизация	Impromptu	1859	1859	—	Initial Version	1939	Muzgiz
Piano	Импровизация апассионато (Воспоминание о Бельтове и Любе)	Passionate Impromptu (Recollection of Beltov and Lyuba)	1859	1859	—	Revision	1911	Bessel
Piano	Ein Kinderscherz	Children's Games	1860	1860	—		1873	Bitner
Piano	Ein Kinderscherz (Детские игры-уголки)	Children's Games	1859	1859	—		1934	Muzgiz
Piano Duet	Увертюра на темы трех русских песен	Overture on the Themes of Three Russian Songs	1860	1860	—	Arrangement (Balakirev)		
Piano Duet	Король Лир, музыка к трагедии Шекспира	King Lear, music to Shakespeare's Tragedy	1860	1860	—	Arrangement (Balakirev)		
Piano	Квартет для двух скрипок, альта и виолончели, Op. 59, No. 3	Andante, from String Quartet in C major, Op. 59, No. 3	1859	1859	—	Arrangement (Beethoven)		
Piano Duet	Соната C-dur	Sonata in C major	1860	1860	—	Unfinished		
Piano	Preludium in modo classico	Prelude in the Classic Style	1860	1860	—	Lost	—	—
Piano	Intermezzo in modo classico	Intermezzo in the Classic Style	1860	1861	—	Initial Version	1873	Bitner
Piano	Intermezzo in modo classico	Intermezzo in the Classic Style	1867	1867	—	Revision	1939	Muzgiz
Piano	Menuet monstre	Menuet monstre	1861	1861	—	Lost	—	—
Piano Duet	Квартет для двух скрипок, альта и виолончели, Op. 130	String Quartet in B♭ major, Op. 130	1862	1862	—	Arrangement (Beethoven)		
Piano	Грузинская песня	Georgian Song	1862	1862	—	Arrangement (Balakirev)	1862	Stellovsky
Piano Duet	Ромео и Джульетта	Romeo and Juliet	1862	1862	—	Arrangement (Berlioz)		
Piano	Из воспоминаний детства	From Memories of Childhood	1865	1865	—		1934	Muzgiz
Piano	Дума	Rêverie	1865	1865	—		1911	Bessel
Piano	La Capricieuse	La Capricieuse	1865	1865	—		1939	Muzgiz
Piano	Квартет для двух скрипок, альта и виолончели, Op. 59, No. 2	Allegretto, from String Quartet in e minor, Op. 59, No. 2	1867	1867	—	Arrangement (Beethoven)		
Piano	Квартет для двух скрипок, альта и виолончели, Op. 131	Presto, from String Quartet in C♯ minor, Op. 131	1867	1867	—	Arrangement (Beethoven)		
Piano	Квартет для двух скрипок, альта и виолончели, Op. 135	Lento and Vivace, from String Quartet in F major, Op. 135	1867	1867	—	Arrangement (Beethoven)		
Piano	Швея (скерцино)	The Seamstress (Scherzino)	1871	1871	—		1872	Bernard
Piano	Картинки с выставки	Pictures at an Exhibition	1874-06-02	1874-06-22	—		1886	Bessel
Piano	Буря на черном море	Storm on the Black Sea	1879	1879	—	Lost	—	—
Piano	Близ южного берега Крыма (Байдарки)	Near the Southern Shore of the Crimea (Baydarki)	1880	1880	—		1880	Bernard
Piano	На южном берегу Крыма (Гурзуф у Аю-Дага)	On the Southern Shore of the Crimea (Gurzuf at Ayu-Dag)	1880	1880	—		1880	Bernard
Piano	Méditation (feuillet d'album)	Meditation (Album Leaf)	1880	1880	—		1880	Bernard
Piano	Une Larme	A Tear	1880	1880	—		1880	Bernard
Piano	Au Village (Quasi Fantasia)	In the Village (Quasi Fantasia)	1880	1880	—		1882	
Piano	Ярмарочная сцена из оперы "Сорочинская ярмарка"	Fair Scene from the opera Sorochyntsi Fair	1880	1880	—	Arrangement (Mussorgsky)	1939	Muzgiz
Piano	Гопак веселых паробков из оперы "Сорочинская ярмарка"	Gopak of the Merry Lads from the opera Sorochyntsi Fair	1880	1880	—	Arrangement (Mussorgsky)	1939	Muzgiz
Chorus	Марш Шамиля	Shamil's March	1859	1859-10-11		Projected	—	—
Chorus	Поражение Сеннахериба	The Destruction of Sennacherib	1866	1867	Byron	Initial Version	1871	Bitner
Chorus	Поражение Сеннахериба	The Destruction of Sennacherib	1874	1874	Byron	Revision	1939	Muzgiz
Chorus	Иисус Навин	Iisus Navin (Joshua)	1874	1877-07-02	The Bible		1883	Bessel
Chorus	Вокализы для трех женских голосов	Vocalises for three women's voices	1880	1880	—			
Chorus	Пять Русских народных песен	Five Russian Folksongs	1880	1880	Anonymous	Unfinished		
Song	Сельская песня	"Rustic Song"	1857	1857-04-18	Grekov	Initial Version	1911	Bessel
Song	Где ты, звёздочка?	"Where Art Thou, Little Star?"	1858-06-03	1858-06-04	Grekov	Orchestration		
Song	Где ты, звёздочка?	"Where Art Thou, Little Star?"	1863-66	1863-66	Grekov	Revision		
Song	Meines Herzens Sehnsucht	"Thou Longing of My Heart"	1858	1858-09-06	Anonymous		1907	
Song	Отчего, скажи, душа-девица	"Tell Me Why, Fair Maiden"	1858	1858-07-31	Anonymous		1867	Iogansen
Song	Весёлый час	"The Joyous Hour"	1858-59	1858-59	Koltsov	Initial Version		
Song	Весёлый час	"The Joyous Hour"	1863-66	1863-66	Koltsov	Revision	1923	Bessel
Song	Листья шумели уныло	"Leaves Rustled Sadly"	1859	1859	Pleshcheyev		1911	Bessel
Song	Что вам слова любви?	"What are Words of Love to You?"	1860	1860	Ammosov		1923	Bessel
Song	Много есть у меня теремов и садов	"Many Are My Palaces and Gardens"	1863	1863	Koltsov		1923	Bessel
Song	Песнь старца	"Old Man's Song"	1863	1863-08-13	Goethe		1911	Bessel
Song	Царь Саул	"Tsar Saul"	1863	1863	Byron	Initial Version		
Song	Царь Саул	"Tsar Saul"	1863	1863	Byron	Revision	1871	Bessel
Song	Но если-бы с тобою я встретиться могла	"But If I Could Meet Thee"	1863	1863-08-15	Kurochkin		1923	Bessel
Song	Дуют ветры, ветры буйные	"The Winds Blow, the Wild Winds"	1864	1864-03-28	Koltsov		1911	Bessel
Song	Калистратушка	"Kalistratushka"	1864	1864-05-22	Nekrasov	Initial Version		
Song	Калистрат	"Kalistrat"	1864	1864	Nekrasov	Revision		
Song	Ночь	"Night"	1864	1864-04-10	Pushkin	Initial Version		
Song	Ночь	"Night"	1868	1868	Pushkin	Revision	1871	Bessel
Song Duet	Ogni sabato (Canto Popolare Toscano)	"Every Saturday" (Tuscan Popular Song)	1864	1864		Arrangement (Gordigiani)	1931	
Song	Молитва	"A Prayer"	1865	1865-02-02	Lermontov		1923	Bessel
Song	Отверженная (Опыт речитатива)	"The Outcast [Woman]" (An essay in recitative)	1865	1865-06-05	Holz-Miller		1923	Bessel
Song	Колыбельная песня	"Cradle Song"	1865	1865-09-05	Ostrovsky	Initial version		
Song	Спи, усни, крестьянский сын	"Sleep, Go to Sleep, Peasant Son"	1865	1865	Ostrovsky	Revision	1871	Bessel
Song	Малютка	"Little One"	1866	1866-01-07	Pleshcheyev		1923	Bessel
Song	Желание	"Desire"	1866-04-15	1866-04-16	Heine		1911	
Song	Из слёз моих	"From My Tears"	1866	1866	Heine			
Song	Светик Савишна	"Darling Savishna"	1866	1866-09-02	Mussorgsky		1867	Iogansen
Song	Ах, ты, пьяная тетеря	"Ah, You Drunken Sot"	1866	1866	Mussorgsky		1926	
Song	Семинарист	"The Seminarist"	1866	1866	Mussorgsky		1870	Benicke
Song	Гопак	"Gopak"	1866	1866-08-31	Shevchenko	Initial Version		
Song	Гопак	"Gopak"	1868	1868	Shevchenko	Revision	1868	Iogansen
Song	Песнь Ярёмы	"Yaryoma's Song"	1866	1866	Shevchenko	Lost	—	—
Song	На Днепре	"On the Dnieper"	1879	1879-12-23	Shevchenko	Revision	1888	
Song	Еврейская песня	"Hebrew Song"	1867	1867-06-12	Mey		1868	Iogansen
Song	Стрекотунья-белобока	"Magpie Whitesides"	1867	1867-08-26	Pushkin		1871	Bessel
Song	По грибы	"Gathering Mushrooms"	1867	1867-08	Mey		1868	Iogansen
Song	Пирушка	"The Banquet" (or The Feast)	1867	1867-09	Koltsov		1868	Iogansen
Song	Озорник	"The Urchin" (or The Ragamuffin)	1867	1867-12-19	Mussorgsky		1871	Bessel
Song	Светская сказочка (Козёл)	"A Society Tale (The Goat)"	1867	1867-12-23	Mussorgsky		1868	Iogansen
Song	По над Доном сад цветёт	"A Garden by the Don Blooms"	1867	1867-12-23	Koltsov		1883	Bessel
Song	Классик	"The Classicist"	1867	1867-12-30	Mussorgsky		1870	Arngold
Song	Сиротка	"The Orphan"	1868	1868-04-06	Mussorgsky		1871	Bessel
Song	Колыбельная Ерёмушки	"Yeryomushka's Lullaby"	1868	1868-03-16	Nekrasov		1871	Bessel
Song	Детская песенка	"A Child's Song"	1868	1868	Mey		1871	Bessel
Song Cycle	Детская	The Nursery	1868	1870	Mussorgsky		1872	Bessel
Song	С няней	"With Nanny"	1868	1868-04-26	Mussorgsky	Part of a cycle	1872	Bessel
Song	В углу	"In the Corner"	1870	1870-09-30	Mussorgsky	Part of a cycle	1871	Bessel
Song	Жук	"The Beetle"	1870	1870-10-18	Mussorgsky	Part of a cycle	1871	Bessel
Song	С куклой	"With the Doll"	1870	1870-12-18	Mussorgsky	Part of a cycle	1871	Bessel
Song	На сон грядущий	"At Bedtime"	1870	1870-12-18	Mussorgsky	Part of a cycle	1872	Bessel
Song Cycle	На даче	At the Dacha	1872	1872	Mussorgsky	Unfinished	1882	Bessel
Song	Поехал на палочке	"Ride on a Stick-Horse"	1872	1872-09-15	Mussorgsky	Part of a cycle	1882	Bessel
Song	Кот Матрос	"The Cat 'Sailor'"	1872	1872-08-15	Mussorgsky	Part of a cycle	1882	Bessel
Song	Раёк	"The Gallery (The Peep-Show)"	1870	1870-06-15	Mussorgsky		1871	Bessel
Song	Вечерняя песенка	"Evening Song"	1871	1871-03-15	Pleshcheyev		1912	Bessel
Song Cycle	Без солнца	Sunless	1874	1874-08-25	Golenishchev-Kutuzov		1874	Bessel
Song	В четырёх стенах	"Within Four Walls"	1874	1874-05-07	Golenishchev-Kutuzov	Part of a cycle	1874	Bessel
Song	Меня в толпе ты не узнала	"Thou Didst Not Know Me in the Crowd"	1874	1874-05-19	Golenishchev-Kutuzov	Part of a cycle	1874	Bessel
Song	Окончен праздный шумный день	"The Idle Noisy Day is Ended"	1874	1874-05-20	Golenishchev-Kutuzov	Part of a cycle	1874	Bessel
Song	Скучай	"Be Bored"	1874	1874-06-02	Golenishchev-Kutuzov	Part of a cycle	1874	Bessel
Song	Элегия	"Elegy"	1874	1874-08-19	Golenishchev-Kutuzov	Part of a cycle	1874	Bessel
Song	Над рекой	"On the River"	1874	1874-08-25	Golenishchev-Kutuzov	Part of a cycle	1874	Bessel
Song	Забытый	"Forgotten"	1874	1874	Golenishchev-Kutuzov		1874	Bessel
Song	Надгробное письмо	"The Epitaph"	1874	1874	Mussorgsky	Unfinished	1912	Bessel
Song	Крапивная Гора	"Nettle Mountain"	1874	1874	Mussorgsky	Unfinished	1939	Muzgiz
Song Cycle	Песни и пляски смерти	Songs and Dances of Death	1875	1877	Golenishchev-Kutuzov		1882	Bessel
Song	Колыбельная	"Lullaby"	1875	1875-04-14	Golenishchev-Kutuzov	Part of a cycle	1882	Bessel
Song	Серенада	"Serenade"	1875	1875-05-11	Golenishchev-Kutuzov	Part of a cycle	1882	Bessel
Song	Трепак	"Trepak"	1875	1875-02-17	Golenishchev-Kutuzov	Part of a cycle	1882	Bessel
Song	Полководец	"The Field-Marshal"	1877	1877-06-05	Golenishchev-Kutuzov	Part of a cycle	1882	Bessel
Song	Непонятная	"The Misunderstood One"	1875	1875-12-21	Mussorgsky		1911	Bessel
Song	Не божиим громом горе ударило	"Not Like Thunder from Heaven"	1877	1877-03-05	Tolstoy		1882	Bessel
Song	Горними тихо летела душа небесами	"Softly the Spirit Flew up to Heaven"	1877	1877-03-09	Tolstoy		1882	Bessel
Song	Ой, честь ли то молодцу лён прясти	"Is It an Honor for a Young Man to Weave Flax?"	1877	1877-03-20	Tolstoy		1882	Bessel
Song	Рассевается, расступается	"It Scatters and Breaks"	1877	1877-03-21	Tolstoy		1882	Bessel
Song	Видение	"The Vision"	1877	1877-04-07	Golenishchev-Kutuzov		1882	Bessel
Song	Спесь	"Pride"	1877-05-15	1877-05-16	Tolstoy		1882	Bessel
Song	Странник	"The Wanderer"	1878	1878	Rückert		1883	Bessel
Song	Песня Мефистофеля в погребке Ауэрбаха (Песня о блохе)	"Mephistopheles' Song in Auerbach's Cellar (Song of the Flea)"	1879	1879	Goethe		1883	

== Detailed list by category ==
=== Operas ===
Title	Start	End	Notes
Han of Iceland	1856	1856	Projected; to be based on the novel Han d'Islande (1823) by Victor Hugo
Oedipus in Athens	1858	1860	Unfinished; based on the tragedy Oedipus in Athens (1804) by Vladislav Ozerov; only one number survives—'Scene in the Temple: Chorus of the People'
Salammbô	1863	1866	Unfinished; based on the novel Salammbô (1862) by Gustave Flaubert
Marriage	1868	1868	Unfinished; Act I only (4 scenes); piano-vocal score; based on the comedy Marriage (1842) by Nikolai Gogol; Rimsky-Korsakov edition published in 1908; composer's version published in 1933
Boris Godunov	1868-10	1869-12-15	Original version; based on the drama Boris Godunov (1825) by Alexander Pushkin
Bobïl	1870	1870	Projected; to be based on the drama Hans und Grete (1868) by Friedrich Spielhagen; Marfa's Divination from Khovanshchina derives from sketches for this work
Boris Godunov	1871	1872	Revised version; based on the drama Boris Godunov (1825) by Alexander Pushkin; minor revisions in 1873
Mlada	1872	1872	Unfinished; libretto by Viktor Krïlov; collaborative work with Cui, Minkus, Rimsky-Korsakov, and Borodin;
Khovanshchina	1872	1880	Unfinished; libretto by Mussorgsky; based on historical accounts
The Fair at Sorochyntsi	1874	1880	Unfinished; based on the short story Sorochyntsi Fair, from Evenings on a Farm Near Dikanka (1832) by Nikolai Gogol
Pugachovshchina	1877	1877	Projected; possibly to be based on the novel The Captain's Daughter (1836) by Alexander Pushkin

=== Orchestral works ===
Title	Start	End	Notes
Scherzo in B♭ major	1858	1858	Originally for piano
Alla marcia notturna	1861	1861	
Symphony in D major	1861	1862	Lost, unfinished: Andante, Scherzo, and Finale only
Night on Bald Mountain	1867	1867	Tone poem; recast for orchestra and chorus as 'Glorification of Chornobog' for inclusion in the collaborative opera Mlada (1872), and again as 'Dream Vision of the Peasant Lad' in the opera Sorochyntsi Fair (1880)
Intermezzo symphonique in modo classico	1867	1867	Originally for piano; trio added
Podebrad of Bohemia	1867	1867	Projected; based on the life of George of Poděbrady
The Capture of Kars (March)	1880	1880	Occasional piece commemorating the Siege of Kars (1855)
Transcaucasian Suite	1880	1880	Projected; for orchestra, harps, and piano

=== Piano works ===
Title	Start	End	Notes
Polka Flag-Bearer (Подпрапорщик or Porte-enseigne)”	1852	1852	
Souvenir of Childhood	1857	1857	edition by V. Karatygin (1911)
Sonata in E♭ major	1858	1858	lost; was unfinished: Scherzo and Finale only
Sonata in F♯ minor	1858	1858	lost
Scherzo in C♯ minor	1858	1858	edition by V. Karatygin (1911)
Scherzo in B♭ major	1858	1858	orchestrated
Souvenir of a Summer Night in Madrid	1858	1858	arrangement for piano 4-hands of the Fantasia on Spanish Themes (Souvenir d'une nuit d'été à Madrid, 1848) by Mikhail Glinka
Passionate Impromptu (Recollection of Beltov and Lyuba)	1859	1859	inspired by the novel Who is to Blame? (1847) by Aleksandr Gertsen (Herzen)
King Lear, Music to Shakespeare's Tragedy	1859	1860	arrangement for piano 4-hands of the overture and entr'actes to the incidental music King Lear by Mily Balakirev
Andante, from String Quartet in C major	1859	1859	arrangement for piano solo of the 2nd movement of the String Quartet in C major, Op. 59, No. 3, by Ludwig van Beethoven
Children's Game: Corners (уголки)	1859	1859	original
Children's Game: Corners (уголки)	1860	1860	revised version
Overture on the Themes of Three Russian Songs	1860	1860	arrangement for piano 4-hands of the Overture on the Themes of Three Russian Songs (1858) by Mili Balakirev
Sonata (Allegro assai in C Major — Scherzo in C Minor) for Piano 4-Hands	1860	1860	unfinished; scherzo is based on the Scherzo in C♯ minor (1858)
Prelude in the Classic Style	1860	1860	lost
Intermezzo in the Classic Style	1860	1861	orchestrated in 1867
Menuet Monstre	1861	1861	lost
Georgian Song	1862	1862	arrangement of the orchestral accompaniment to the song by Balakirev
String Quartet in B♭ major	1862	1862	arrangement for two pianos, eight hands, of the String Quartet in B♭ major, Op. 130, by Ludwig van Beethoven; finale incomplete
Romeo and Juliet	1862	1862	arrangement for piano 4-hands of two numbers from Roméo et Juliette by Hector Berlioz: • Бал у Капулетти (Ball at the Capulets) • Королева Маб (Queen Mab)
From Memories of Childhood	1865	1865	two numbers: • Няня и я (Nanny and I) • Няня запирает меня в темную комнату (Первое наказание), or Nanny Shuts Me In a Dark Room (First Punishment)
Rêverie	1865	1865	on a theme by V. Loginov
La Capricieuse	1865	1865	on a theme by L. Geyden (Heyden)
Allegretto, from String Quartet in e minor	1867	1867	arrangement for piano solo of the 3rd movement of the String Quartet in e minor, Op. 59, No. 2, by Ludwig van Beethoven
Presto, from String Quartet in C♯ minor	1867	1867	arrangement for piano solo of the 5th movement of the String Quartet in C♯ minor, Op. 131, by Beethoven
Vivace and Lento, from String Quartet in F major	1867	1867	arrangement for piano solo of the 2nd and 3rd movements of the String Quartet in F major, Op. 135, by Beethoven
Scherzino “La couturière (Швея, or The Seamstress)”	1871	1871	
Pictures at an Exhibition (Картинки с выставки)	1874	1874	edition by Nikolay Rimsky-Korsakov (1886)
Storm on the Black Sea	1879	1879	lost
On Crimea’s South Coast (На южном берегу Крыма)	1880	1880	inspired by a visit to Gurzuf at Ayu-Dag in Crimea
Capriccio “Near Crimea’s South Coast (Близ южного берега Крыма)”	1880	1880	also known as the Baydarki Capriccio
Méditation (Размышление)	1880	1880	
Une larme (Слеза, or A Tear)	1880	1880	
Quasi fantasia “Au village (В деревне)”	1880	1880	
Fair Scene from the opera Sorochyntsi Fair	1880	1880	arrangement of the Fair Scene from The Fair at Sorochyntsi (1880)
Gopak of the Merry Lads from the opera Sorochyntsi Fair	1880	1880	arrangement of the Gopak from The Fair at Sorochyntsi (1880)

=== Choral works ===
Title	Start	End	Notes
Shamil's March	1859	1859	Projected; for tenor, baritone, chorus, and orchestra
The Destruction of Sennacherib	1866	1867	Original version; for chorus and orchestra; based on The Destruction of Sennacherib from Hebrew Melodies (1815)
The Destruction of Sennacherib	1874	1874	Revised version; for chorus and orchestra; based on The Destruction of Sennacherib from Hebrew Melodies (1815)
Iisus Navin	1874	1877-07-02	Also known as Joshua; for alto, baritone, chorus, and piano; based on a biblical text; orchestral edition by Rimsky-Korsakov published in 1883
Three Vocalises	1880	1880	For three-part female voices: • Andante cantabile • Largo • Andante giusto
Five Russian Folksongs	1880	1880	For four-part male voices; No.4 with 2 solo tenors; No.5 incomplete: • Скажи, девица милая ("Tell Me, Dear Maiden") • Ты взойди, взойди солнце красное ("Rise, Rise Thou Fair Sun") • У ворот, ворот батюшкиных ("At the Gates, Father's Gates") • Уж ты, воля, моя воля ("Oh Thou, Freedom, My Freedom") • Плывет, восплывает, зеленый садок ("A Green Garden Floats")

=== Songs ===
Title	Start	End	Notes
"Rustic Song"	1857	1857-04-18	Original version of the song Where Art Thou, Little Star? (1863–1866); based on a text by Nikolay Grekov; orchestrated on 1858-06-03
"Where Art Thou, Little Star?"	1858-06-03	1858-06-04	Orchestrated version of the song Rustic Song (1857); based on a text by Nikolay Grekov
"Thou Longing of My Heart"	1858	1858	Based on a text by an anonymous author; German text; a wedding present for Malvina Bamberg, César Cui's bride; manuscript lost; published in 1907
"Tell Me Why, Fair Maiden"	1858	1858-07-31	Based on a text by an anonymous author
"The Joyous Hour"	1858	1859	Original version, revised in 1859; based on a text by Aleksey Koltsov
"Leaves Rustled Sadly"	1859	1859	Original version, revised in 1863-1866; based on a text by Aleksey Pleshcheyev
"What Are Words of Love to You?"	1860	1860	Original version, revised in 1863-1866; based on a text by A. Ammosov
"The Joyous Hour"	1863	1866	Revised version, originally composed in 1858-1859; based on a text by Aleksey Koltsov; published in Paris (1923)
"Leaves Rustled Sadly"	1863	1866	Revised version, original composed in 1859; based on a text by Aleksey Pleshcheyev
"What Are Words of Love to You?"	1863	1866	Revised version, original version composed in 1860; based on a text by A. Ammosov; published in Paris (1923)
"Many Are My Palaces and Gardens"	1863	1863	Based on a text by Aleksey Koltsov
"Old Man's Song"	1863	1863	Also known as The Harper's Song; based on An die Türen will ich schleichen from Wilhelm Meisters Lehrjahre (Bk.5, Ch.14) by Johann Wolfgang von Goethe
"Tsar Saul"	1863	1863	Based on Warriors and Chiefs (Song of Saul before His Last Battle) from Hebrew Melodies (1815) by Byron, translated by Ivan Kozlov
"But If I Could Meet Thee Again"	1863	1863	Based on a text by Vasily Kurochkin
"Where Art Thou, Little Star?"	1863-66	1863-66	Revised version of the song Rustic Song (1858); based on a text by Nikolay Grekov
"The Winds Blow, the Wild Winds"	1864	1864	Based on a text by Aleksey Koltsov; published in Paris (1909)
"Night"	1864	1864	Original version, revised in 1868; based on a text by Aleksandr Pushkin;
"Kalistratushka"	1864	1864	Original version of the song Kalistrat; based on a text by Nikolay Nekrasov
"Kalistrat"	1864	1864	Revised version of the song Kalistratushka; based on a text by Nikolay Nekrasov;
"Every Saturday (Tuscan Popular Song)"	1864	1864	Arrangement of the song Ogni sabato avresti il lume acceso (1853) by Luigi Gordigiani; for mezzo-soprano, baritone, and piano
"A Prayer"	1865	1865	Based on a text by Mikhail Lermontov
"The Outcast [Woman]" (An essay in recitative)	1865	1865	Based on a text by Holz-Miller
"Cradle Song"	1865	1865	Original version of Sleep, Go to Sleep, Peasant Son; based on a text by Aleksandr Ostrovsky
"Sleep, Go to Sleep, Peasant Son"	1865	1865	Revised version of Cradle Song; based on a text by Aleksandr Ostrovsky
"Little One"	1866	1866-01-07	Based on a text by Aleksey Pleshcheyev
"Desire"	1866-04-15	1866-04-16	Based on a text by Heinrich Heine, Ich wollt' meine Schmerzen ergössen
"From My Tears"	1866	1866	Based on a text by Heinrich Heine, Aus meinen Tränen
"Darling Savishna"	1866	1866	Text by Mussorgsky
"Ah, You Drunken Sot"	1866	1866	Text by Mussorgsky
"The Seminarist"	1866	1866	Text by Mussorgsky
"Hopak"	1866	1866	Original version, revised in 1868; based on the epic poem Gaydamaki (1841) by Taras Shevchenko, translated by Lev Mey
"Yaryoma's Song"	1866	1866	Lost; original version of On the Dnieper; based on the epic poem Gaydamaki (1841) by Taras Shevchenko, translated by Lev Mey
"Hebrew Song"	1867	1867	Based on a text by Lev Mey
"Magpie Whitesides"	1867	1867	Based on a text by Aleksandr Pushkin
"Gathering Mushrooms"	1867	1867	Based on a text by Lev Mey
"The Banquet" (or The Feast)	1867	1867	Based on a text by Aleksey Koltsov
"The Urchin" (or The Ragamuffin)	1867	1867	Text by Mussorgsky
"A Society Tale" (The Goat)	1867	1867	Text by Mussorgsky
"A Garden by the Don Blooms"	1867	1867-12-23	Ballad; composed 23 December 1867 in Saint Petersburg; based on a text by Aleksey Koltsov; published in 1883 by Bessel
"The Classicist"	1867	1867-12-30	Musical pamphlet ("In response to a remark by [Aleksandr] Famintsïn regarding the heresy of the Russian school"); composed 30 December 1867 in Saint Petersburg; text by Mussorgsky; published in 1870 by Arngold; dedicated to Nadezhda Opochinin
"Night"	1868	1868	Revised version, original composed in 1864; based on a text by Aleksandr Pushkin;
"Hopak"	1868	1868	Revised version, original composed in 1866; orchestrated; based on the epic poem Gaydamaki (1841) by Taras Shevchenko, translated by Lev Mey
"The Orphan"	1868	1868	Text by Mussorgsky
"Yeryomushka's Lullaby"	1868	1868	Based on a text by Nikolay Nekrasov
"A Child's Song"	1868	1868	Based on a text by Lev Mey
The Nursery	1868	1872	Text by Mussorgsky; cycle of 7 songs
"With Nanny"	1868	1868-04-26	Text by Mussorgsky; part of The Nursery
"In the Corner"	1870	1870-09-30	Text by Mussorgsky; part of The Nursery
"The Beetle"	1870	1870-10-18	Text by Mussorgsky; part of The Nursery
"With the Doll"	1870	1870-12-18	Text by Mussorgsky; part of The Nursery
"Going to Sleep"	1870	1870	Text by Mussorgsky; part of The Nursery
"The Peep-Show"	1870	1870	Text by Mussorgsky; satire
"Evening Song"	1871	1871	Based on a text by Aleksey Pleshcheyev
At the Dacha	1872	1881	Text by Mussorgsky; unfinished cycle of songs; the two songs completed were later included in The Nursery
"Ride on a Stick-Horse"	1872	1872-09-15	Text by Mussorgsky; part of At the Dacha
"The Cat 'Sailor'"	1872	1872-08-15	Text by Mussorgsky; part of At the Dacha
Sunless	1874	1874	Based on a text by Arseniy Golenishchev-Kutuzov; cycle of 6 songs
"Within Four Walls"	1874	1874	Based on a text by Arseniy Golenishchev-Kutuzov; part of Sunless
"Thou Didst Not Know Me in the Crowd"	1874	1874	Based on a text by Arseniy Golenishchev-Kutuzov; part of Sunless
"The Idle Noisy Day is Ended"	1874	1874	Based on a text by Arseniy Golenishchev-Kutuzov; part of Sunless
"Boredom" (or Ennui)	1874	1874	Based on a text by Arseniy Golenishchev-Kutuzov; part of Sunless
"Elegy"	1874	1874	Based on a text by Arseniy Golenishchev-Kutuzov; part of Sunless
"Over the River"	1874	1874	Based on a text by Arseniy Golenishchev-Kutuzov; part of Sunless
"Forgotten"	1874	1874	Based on a text by Arseniy Golenishchev-Kutuzov; inspired by the painting Forgotten (1872) by Vasiliy Vereshchagin
"Evil Death (The Epitaph)"	1874	1874	Text by Mussorgsky; unfinished
"Nettle Mountain"	1874-08-10	1874	Text by Mussorgsky; unfinished; satire
Songs and Dances of Death	1875	1877	Based on a text by Arseniy Golenishchev-Kutuzov; cycle of 4 songs
"Lullaby"	1875	1875	Based on a text by Arseniy Golenishchev-Kutuz
"Trepak"	1875	1875	Based on a text by Arseniy Golenishchev-Kutuzov; part of Songs and Dances of Death
"The Misunderstood One"	1875	1875-12-21	Text by Mussorgsky
"The Field-Marshal"	1877	1877	Based on a text by Arseniy Golenishchev-Kutuzov; part of Songs and Dances of Death
"Not Like Thunder From Heaven"	1877	1877	Based on a text by Aleksey Tolstoy
"Softly the Spirit Flew up to Heaven"	1877	1877	Based on a text by Aleksey Tolstoy
"Pride"	1877	1877	Based on a text by Aleksey Tolstoy
"Is It an Honor for a Young Man to Weave Flax?"	1877	1877	Based on a text by Aleksey Tolstoy
"It Scatters and Breaks"	1877	1877	Based on a text by Aleksey Tolstoy
"The Vision"	1877	1877	Based on a text by Arseniy Golenishchev-Kutuzov
"The Wanderer"	1878	1878	Based on Abendlied des Wanderers by Friedrich Rückert, translated by Aleksey Pleshcheyev
"On the Dnieper"	1879	1879	Revised version of Yaryoma's Song; based on the epic poem Gaydamaki (1841) by Taras Shevchenko, translated by Lev Mey
"Mephistopheles' Song in Auerbach's Cellar (Song of the Flea)"	1879	1879	Based on Faust: The First Part of the Tragedy (1808) by Johann Wolfgang von Goethe, translated by Strugovshchikov

== Youthful Years ==
Youthful Years: A Collection of Romances and Songs (Russian: Юные годы: сборник романсов и песен, romanized: Yunïye godï: sbornik romansov i pesen) is a bound series of 18 manuscripts of songs by Mussorgsky, the existence of which was announced by Charles Malherbe in 1909.

1. "Where Art Thou, Little Star?"
2. "The Joyous Hour"
3. "The Leaves Rustled Sadly"
4. "Many Are My Palaces and Gardens"
5. "A Prayer"
6. "Tell Me Why, Gentle Maiden"
7. "What Are Words of Love to You?"
8. "The Winds Blow, Wild Wind"
9. "But If I Could Meet With Thee"
10. "Little One"
11. "Old Man's Song"
12. "King Saul"
13. "Night"
14. "Kalistrat"
15. "The Outcast"
16. "Sleep, Go to Sleep, Peasant Son"
17. "Song of the Balearic Islander"
18. "Every Saturday"

== Opus numbers ==
Michel-Dimitri Calvocoressi provides this list of works with opus numbers, compiled by the composer, prefaced by the following remarks (italics added): "The other catalogue which was sent to Stassof is dated 16 August 1878; but, as it mentions no work composed later than 1874, Andrei Rimsky-Korsakof suggests, rightly, that it must have been compiled some four years earlier. Its only value is that of a biographical curiosity."

Note: The columns 'category' and 'notes', as well as the column headings, have been added for the convenience of the reader. It will be noticed that Calvocoressi's date given in the preceding remarks (16 August 1878) does not match that given below.

"To Vladimir Vasilievich Stasov in memory of Mussorianin That's all I know " - M. Mussorianin
26 August '78, Petrograd

Opus	Category	Works	Composer's remarks	Notes
Op. 1	Various	• Ein Kinderscherz (1859) • Scherzo in B♭ major for orchestra (1859) • Intermezzo (1861) • Scherzino (1872)		
Op. 2	Choral	• The Destruction of Sennacherib (1867) • Joshua (1866)	"Choral"	"Jewish" choruses; Joshua (Iisus Navin), completed in 1877, is based on 'War Song of the Libyans' from Salammbô, composed in 1866
Op. 3	Songs	• "Hopak" (1866) • "Gathering Mushrooms" (1867) • "Yeremushka's Lullaby" (1868) • "The Peasant's Lullaby" (1865) • "The Orphan" (1868) • "The He-Goat" (1867)		
Op. 4	Songs	• "The Ragamuffin" (1868) • "The Seminarist" (1866) • "Savishna" (1866)		
Op. 5	Songs	• "Night" (1864) • "King Saul" (1863) • "The Feast" (1867) • "Jewish Song" (1867) • "The Magpie" (1867) • "A Child's Song" (1868)		
Op. 6	Song Album	The Nursery (1868-1869): • "With Nanny" • "In the Corner" • "The Cockchafer" • "Evening Prayer" • "With the Doll"		
Op. 7	Opera	Marriage (1868)	"An act of Gogol's Marriage"	
Op. 8	Songs	• "The Classicist" (1867) • "The Peep-Show" (1869)		Satiric songs
Op. 9	Opera	Boris Godunov (1868-1872)		
Op. 10	Opera	Mlada (1873): • "Market Scene" • "March of the Princes and Priests" • "Glorification of Tchernobog"	"Scenes from the opera Mlada (not an opera of mine)"	The Mlada numbers were composed in 1872.
Op. 11	Piano	Pictures at an Exhibition (1874)	"In memory of Hartmann"	
Op. 12	Song Album	Sunless (1874)	"Album of six poems by Count Golenishchef-Kutuzof"	
-	Opera	Salammbô (1864-1865)	"Studies for the opera Salammbô after Flaubert"	Composed in 1863-1866
-	Song	"I'm Riding to Yukka!" (1873)		Also known as 'The Hobby-Horse'; part of At the Dacha; later appended to The Nursery; composed in 1872
-	Song	"The Old Believer's Song" (1874)		Marfa's song, 'A Maiden Wandered', from Act 3 of Khovanshchina
-	Song	"Forgotten" (1874)	"After Vereshchagin"	
-	Song	"The Mound of Nettles" (1874)		Satiric song; unfinished
-	Opera	Khovanshchina (1874)	"Materials for the opera Khovanshchina (a national music drama)"	
