= Karevo =

Karevo (Russian: Карево) is the name of two rural localities in Russia:

- Karevo, Pskov Oblast, a village in Kunyinsky District of Pskov Oblast
- Karevo, Vladimir Oblast, a village in Sudogodsky District of Vladimir Oblast
