= Sunless =

Sunless may refer to:

- Sunless (song cycle), by Modest Mussorgsky
- Sans Soleil (Sunless), a 1982 film by [Chris Marker, named after the song cycle
- Sunless (album), a 2019 album by English band PSOTY
- Sunless tanning
