= The Destruction of Sennacherib (choral work) =

Choral work of Modest Mussorgsky

The Destruction of Sennacherib (Russian: Поражение Сеннахериба), is a choral work composed by Modest Mussorgsky (1839–1881), based on Lord Byron's poem "The Destruction of Sennacherib". There are two versions of the work: the first is dated 29 January [N.S. 10 February] 1867, dedicated to Mily Balakirev; it was first performed on 6 March [N.S. 18 March] 1867. A revised version is dated 2 January [N.S. 14 January] 1874, dedicated to Vladimir Stasov.
