= Hebrew Melodies =

Cycle of poems

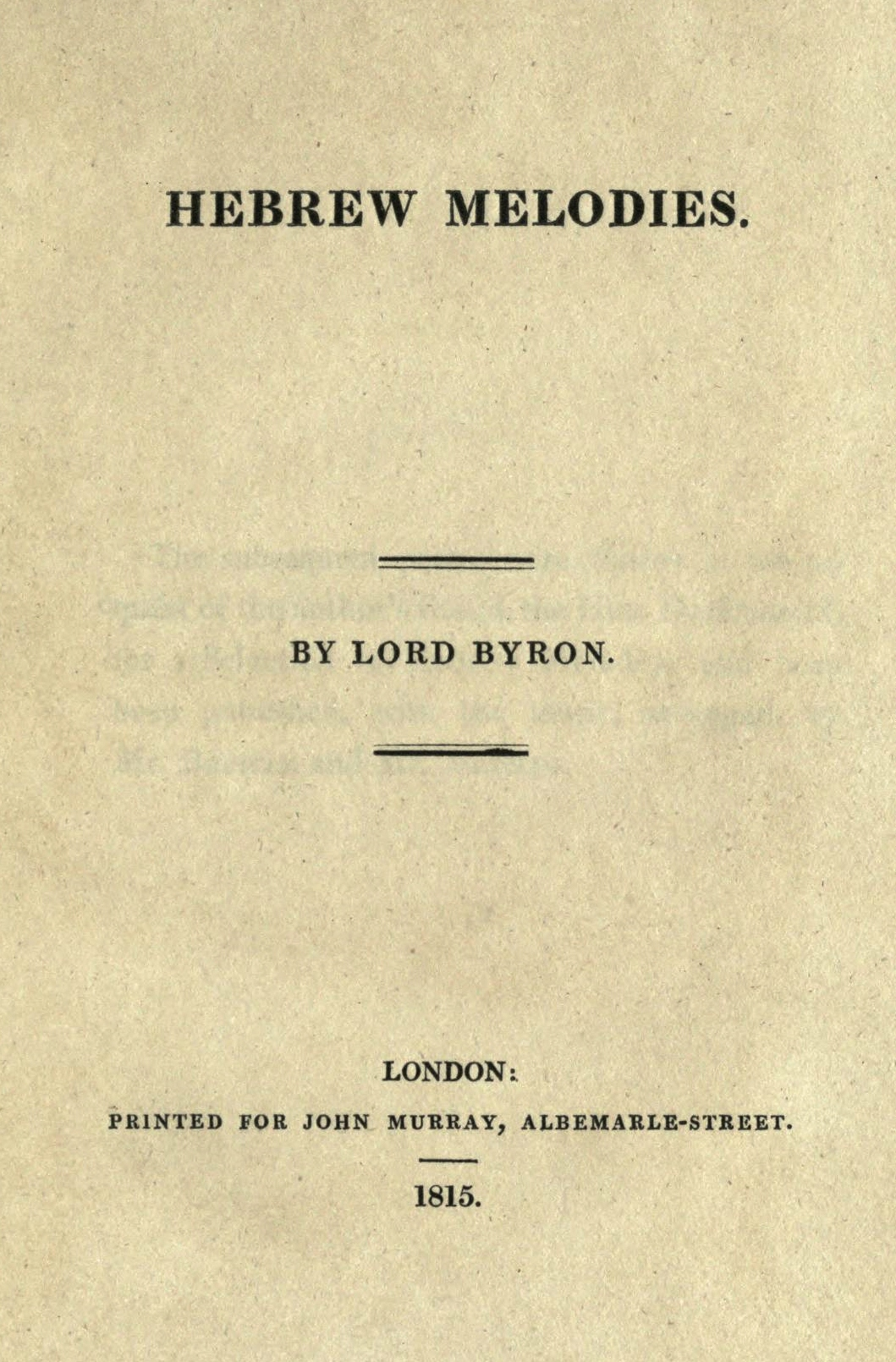
Title page of the first edition of the poems (May 1815)

Hebrew Melodies is a collection of 30 poems by Lord Byron. They were largely created by Byron to accompany music composed by Isaac Nathan, who played the poet melodies which he claimed dated back to the service of the Temple in Jerusalem.

== Background ==
Nathan was an aspiring composer who was the son of a hazzan (synagogue cantor) of Canterbury, of Polish-Jewish ancestry, and was originally educated to be a rabbi. He had published an advertisement in the London Gentleman's Magazine in May 1813 that he was "about to publish 'Hebrew Melodies', all of them upward of 1000 years old and some of them performed by the Ancient Hebrews before the destruction of the Temple." At this stage, he had no words to go with the melodies which he intended to adapt from synagogue usage (although in fact many of these tunes had originated as European folk-melodies and did not have the ancestry he claimed for them). He initially approached Walter Scott, before writing to Byron in 1814. Eventually Byron was encouraged by his friend Douglas Kinnaird to take up Nathan's proposal. Many of the poems were written during the period of Byron's sessions with Nathan between October 1814 and February 1815; a few, including "She Walks in Beauty" and "I speak not – I trace not – I breathe not", predate their meeting.

Nathan's motives were commercial – he was hoping to cash in on a fashion for exotic folk music. (A critical review of the first edition, mocking the concept, commented, "If we should now see the melodies of Kamschatska, or of Madagascar, or of the Hottentots advertised, [...] we should know what to expect: – minstrels, and languishing maidens, the bright tear, the dark blue eye [...]") To this end Nathan persuaded the well-known singer John Braham (who was also Jewish) to lend his name to the title page in return for 50% of any profits.

Byron's motives for cooperating are less clear, but he seems to have been genuinely sympathetic to the cause of the Jews. Byron gave the copyright of the poems to Nathan, and also left him a £50 note when the scandal of the poet's relationship with his half-sister Augusta caused him to flee England in 1816 – an event which also boosted sales of the "Melodies".

== Publication ==
The first volume of twelve musical settings by Nathan for voice and piano was published in April 1815 by Nathan himself. In May of the same year Byron's complete lyrics were published as a book of poems by John Murray, and an edition containing 24 musical settings was published by Nathan in April 1816. This edition, which sold for a guinea, named Braham as a joint-composer in a frontispiece designed by Edward Blore, which also carried a dedication, by Royal permission, to the Princess Royal, Princess Charlotte, to whom Nathan had given some singing lessons.

To the 24 poems published by 1816 Nathan subsequently added six other poems in later editions, the last being "Bright be the place of thy soul", included in Nathan's Fugitive Pieces and Reminiscences of Lord Byron in 1829.

== The poems ==
The poems were not intended to have a religious message, nor were they written from a consistent perspective. In Thomas Ashton's analysis, "First Byron gave Nathan the secular love lyrics he had written in [...] 1814. Then, warming to the composer, he provided some vaguely Jewish poems. Finally, after [his] marriage [...] he sent Nathan poems dealing directly with Old Testament subjects."

Byron wrote to Augusta that the Hebrew Melodies were written "partly from Job &c. & partly my own imagination". They reflected his general sympathy with the downtrodden: as he once wrote, "The Greeks [...] have as small a chance of redemption from the Turks as the Jews have from mankind in general." Thomas Ashton writes "Byron put together nationalism and Jews to write poems about Jewish nationalism, but in those poems he joined Jewish nationalism and a Calvinistically inclined understanding of the Old Testament to create metaphors of man and man's condition [..] In the plight of the exiled Jews, Byron found man's plight, and the tears he shed for fallen nationhood were shed for fallen man as well."

== Nathan's music ==
Not all of the music provided by Nathan can be traced to synagogue melodies; of the first book of twelve, two ("I saw thee weep" and "It is the hour") seem to have been composed by Nathan. Those that are from synagogue melodies are far more recent than the time of the Temple, many of them taken from European folk-tunes including Lutheran hymns which were adapted by Jewish congregations in Central Europe. Nathan's settings are of varying quality: for example "She Walks in Beauty" fits well with the synagogue hymn Adon Olam, whilst "On Jordan's Banks" is forced to fit the hymn Ma'oz Tzur by clumsily altering the natural stresses on the words.

Burwick and Douglass identify four musical styles adopted by Nathan in his settings. "On Jordan's Banks" and "From the Last Hill" they classify as hymns. Five, including "The Destruction of Sennacherib" are executed as 'martial songs'. A third category, the largest (14 songs) they consider derived from German and Italian styles, with "My Soul is Dark" and its Italian ornamentation an example of the latter, and "My Soul is Dark" based on the German lieder style. Two of the songs in this category, "Thou whose spell" and "A Spirit Pass'd" (whose tripartite structure includes a trio, a recitative and an aria), are considered to be influenced by the tradition of oratorio. In eight of the songs they discern specific 'Jewish' characteristics, either because the music seeks to evoke "the stereotypical figure of the suffering Jew", or because the melodic line and 'orientalist' harmonies used by Nathan suggest the exoticism of his subject.

== Reception ==
In October 1814 Byron wrote to his fiancée Annabella Milbanke (whom he was to marry in January 1815, and was a strict Christian) on his writing on this unlikely topic. "It is odd enough that this should have fallen to my lot — who have been abused as an "infidel" — Augusta says they will call me a Jew next" — and indeed that came to pass in street ballads; Byron was also the butt of quips from reviewers of the Melodies such as "A young Lord is seldom the better for meddling with Jews". The British Review complained that "Lord Byron [...] may now be considered as poet laureate to the synagogue." The Courier published parodies of some of the lyrics as English Melodies. These included a version of The Destruction of Sennacherib adapted to a Parliamentary vote ("Oh! Tierney came down like a wolf on the fold / And his phalanx of voters was boasting and bold [...]"), and a personal attack on the poet based on "Sun of the Sleepless": "Son of the faithless! melancholy rat!/ Whose circling sleeve still polishes thy hat / Offering at once thyself and it to sell [...]". Many reviews were however positive; the Gentleman's Magazine called the verses "elegant", and they were also approved by the Edinburgh Review and the Ladies' Monthly Museum. The Christian Observer in August 1815 wrote "The present state of the Jewish people — expatriated — dispersed — trodden down — contemned — afforded the noble poet a very fine subject; and [...] he has not neglected to avail himself of it."

== Influence ==
The poems became popular not only in England but also throughout Europe. In Russia translations of some of the poems were made by Mikhail Lermontov and others. The German poet Heinrich Heine wrote his Hebraïscher Melodien (named as a tribute to Byron's work) as the last section of his 1851 collection, Romanzero.

Many other composers wrote settings of translations of Byron's words, including Felix Mendelssohn, Fanny Mendelssohn, Robert Schumann, Max Bruch, Mily Balakirev and Modest Musorgsky.

== List of poems in the collection ==
- She Walks in Beauty
- The Harp the Monarch Minstrel swept
- If that high world
- The Wild Gazelle
- Oh! weep for those
- On Jordan's banks
- Jephtha's Daughter
- Oh! snatch'd away in beauty's bloom
- My soul is dark
- I saw thee weep
- Thy days are done
- It is the hour
- Warriors and Chiefs
- We sate down and wept by the waters of Babel
- The Vision of Belshazzar
- Herod's Lament for Mariamne
- Were my bosom as false as thou deem'st it to be
- The Destruction of Sennacherib
- Thou whose spell can raise the dead
- When coldness wraps this suffering clay
- Fame, wisdom, love, and power were mine
- From the last hill that looks on thy once holy dome
- Francisca
- Sun of the sleepless
- Bright be the place of thy soul
- I speak not – I trace not – I breathe not
- In the valley of waters
- A spirit pass'd before me
- They say that Hope is happiness
- Bright be the place of they soul
