= Portrait of M. P. Mussorgsky =

1881 painting by Ilya Yefimovich Repin

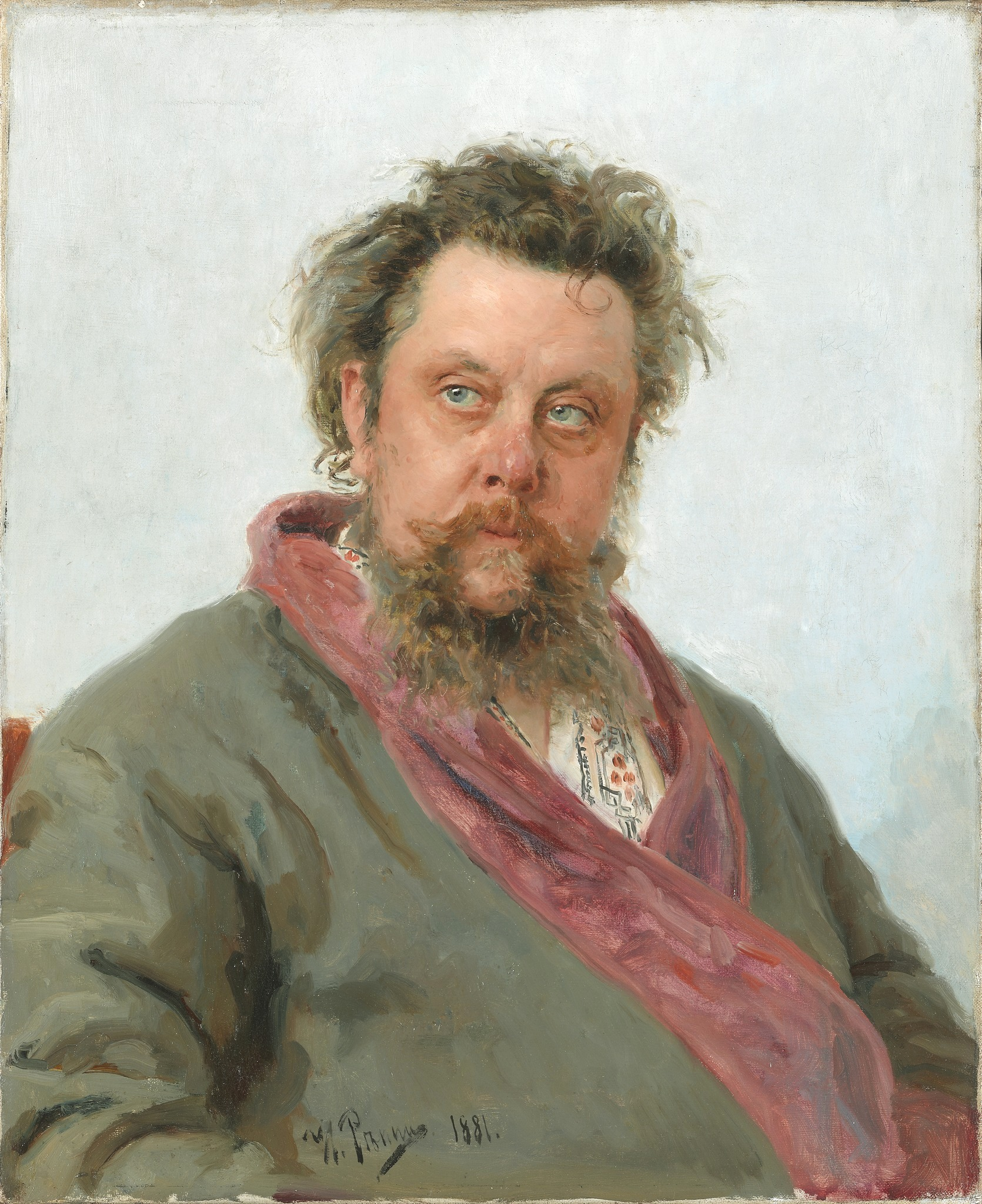
- Artist: Ilya Repin
- Year: 1881
- Dimensions: 58.5 cm × 71.8 cm (23 1/32 in × 28 9/32 in)
- Location: Tretyakov Gallery, Moscow, Russia

Portrait of M. P. Mussorgsky is an 1881 oil painting by Russian realism painter Ilya Repin depicting composer, Modest Mussorgsky. Its dimensions are 58.5 cm x 71.8 cm (23 1/32 in x 38 9/32 in), and it's located at the Tretyakov Gallery in Moscow, Russia, with the inventory number, 730. It was painted merely days prior to the composer's death.

== History ==
Repin was initially requested to paint the work by Vladimir Stasov. He painted it at Nikolaevsky Military Hospital over the span of four sittings. They took place between 14 and 17 March 1881 O.S., or 2 and 5 March 1881 N.S. Repin used a desk to create the portrait due to the unavailability of an easel at the hospital.

The painting was later sold to Pavel Tretyakov, who had purchased the work for 400 rubles without even seeing it. Repin ended up donating that money to help fund a monument in Mussorgsky's honor.

== Description ==
The composer is depicted against a neutral colored background wearing a green hospital robe with red trim.
