= Anapestic tetrameter =

Poetic meter of four anapestic feet per line

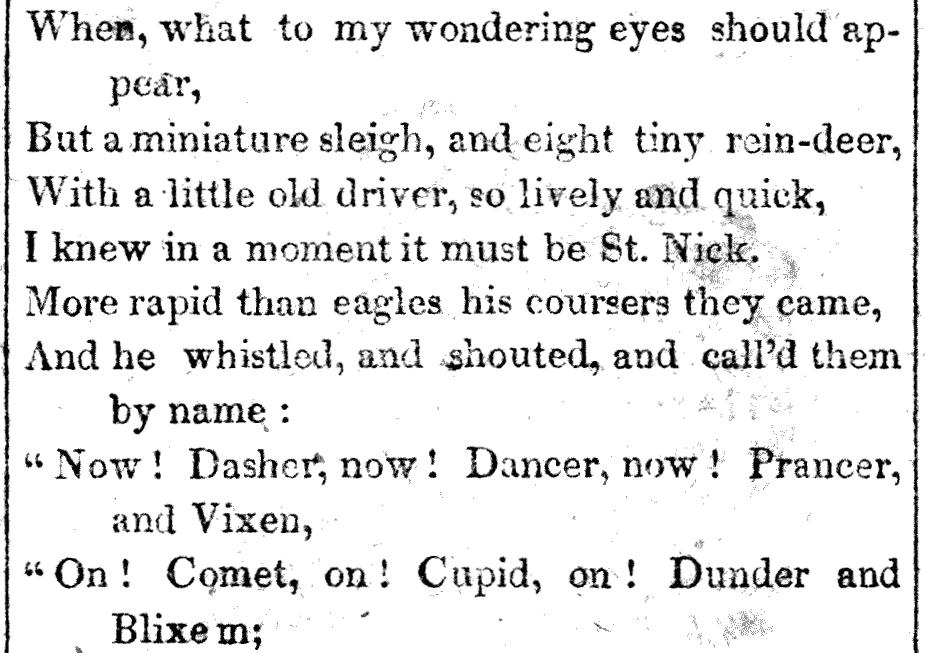
Anapestic tetrameter exemplified in "A Visit from St. Nicholas".

Anapestic tetrameter (British spelling: anapaestic) is a poetic meter that has four anapestic metrical feet per line. Each foot has two unstressed syllables followed by a stressed syllable. It is sometimes referred to as a "reverse dactyl", and shares the rapid, driving pace of the dactyl.

== Description and uses ==
Anapestic tetrameter is a rhythm well suited for comic verse, and prominent examples include Clement Clarke Moore's "A Visit from St. Nicholas" and the majority of Dr. Seuss's poems. When used in comic form, anapestic tetrameter is often highly regular, as the regularity emphasizes the breezy, melodic feel of the meter, though the initial unstressed beat of a line may often be omitted.

== Non comic usage ==
The verse form is not solely comic. Lord Byron's "The Destruction of Sennacherib" is in anapestic tetrameter. Eminem's hit song "The Way I Am" uses the meter for all parts of the song except the chorus. In non-comic works, it is likely that anapestic tetrameter will be used in a less regular manner, with caesuras and other meters breaking up the driving regularity of the beat such as in the case of Edgar Allan Poe's "Annabel Lee". Anapestic tetrameter is generally used in the parode (entrance ode) of classical Greek tragedy.

== Example ==
An anapestic foot is two unstressed syllables followed by a stressed syllable. The rhythm could be written like this:

da	da	DUM

A line of anapestic tetrameter is four of these in a row:

da	da	DUM	da	da	DUM	da	da	DUM	da	da	DUM

One can scan this with a 'x' mark representing an unstressed syllable and a '/' mark representing a stressed syllable. In this notation a line of anapestic tetrameter would look like this:

x	x	/	x	x	/	x	x	/	x	x	/

The following lines from Dr. Seuss' Yertle the Turtle are examples, showing a complete line of anapestic tetrameter followed by a line with the first unstressed syllable omitted. This common technique is called an iambic substitution.

And toDAY the Great YERtle, that MARvelous HE
Is KING of the MUD. That is ALL he can SEE.

The scansion of this can be notated as follows:

x	x	/	x	x	/	x	x	/	x	x	/
And	to-	day	the	Great	Yer-	tle,	that	mar-	vel	ous	he
	x	/	x	x	/	x	x	/	x	x	/
	Is	King	of	the	Mud.	That	is	all	he	can	see

== In Polish ==
Anapestic tetrameter was introduced into Polish literature by Adam Mickiewicz. As Polish language lacks masculine endings, anapestic tetrameter is usually a fourteener (7+7) with feminine endings at both half-lines: ssSssSs||ssSssSs. Mickiewicz probably took it from Walter Scott's The Eve of Saint John. In the 20th century the form was used by Bruno Jasieński and Julian Tuwim. Anapestic tetrameter with masculine ending (ssSssSssSssS) is rare. In Jasieński's But w butonierce lines are shaped according to the pattern ssSssSs||ssSssSs or ssSssSs||ssSssS.

Zmarnowałem podeszwy w całodziennych spieszeniach,
Teraz jestem słoneczny, siebiepewny i rad.
Idę młody, genialny, trzymam ręce w kieszeniach,
Stawiam kroki milowe, zamaszyste, jak świat.
