= Sans Soleil =

1983 French documentary by Chris Marker

- Film poster
- Directed by: Chris Marker
- Written by: Chris Marker (Note: Marker is credited as the writer and cinematographer under the pseudonym Sandor Krasna)
- Narrated by: Florence Delay (French version); Riyoko Ikeda (Japanese version); Charlotte Kerr (German version); Alexandra Stewart (English version)
- Cinematography: Chris Marker
- Edited by: Chris Marker
- Music by: Chris Marker (Note: Marker is credited as the composer under the pseudonym Michel Krasna)
- Distributed by: Argos Films
- Release date: 1983
- Running time: 100 minutes
- Country: France
- Language: French

Sans Soleil (French pronunciation: [sɑ̃ sɔlɛj]; "Sunless") is a 1983 French documentary film directed by Chris Marker. It is a meditation on the nature of human memory, showing the inability to recall the context and nuances of memory, and how, as a result, the perception of personal and global histories is affected. The title Sans Soleil is from the song cycle Sunless by Modest Mussorgsky, a brief fragment of which features in the film. Sans Soleil is composed of documentary footage shot by Marker interwoven with stock footage, clips from Japanese movies and shows, and excerpts and stills from other films.

In a 2014 Sight and Sound poll, film critics voted Sans Soleil the third best documentary film of all time.

== Description ==
Expanding the documentary genre, this experimental essay-film is a composition of thoughts, images and scenes, mainly from Japan and Guinea-Bissau, "two extreme poles of survival". Some other scenes were filmed in Cape Verde, Iceland, Paris, and San Francisco. A female narrator reads from letters supposedly sent to her by the (fictitious) cameraman Sandor Krasna.

Sans Soleil is often labeled a documentary, travelogue, or essay-film. Despite the film's modest use of fictional content, it should not be confused with a mockumentary. The fictional content derived from the juxtaposition of narrative and image adds meaning to the film, along with occasional nondescript movement between locations and lack of character-based narrative.

Chris Marker has said: "On a more matter-of-fact level, I could tell you that the film intended to be, and is nothing more than, a home movie. I really think that my main talent has been to find people to pay for my home movies. Were I born rich, I guess I would have made more or less the same films, at least the traveling kind, but nobody would have heard of them except my friends and visitors."

== Title and introductory quotations ==
The title Sans Soleil is from the song cycle Sunless by Modest Mussorgsky "although only a brief fragment of Mussorgsky's cycle of songs (a brief passage of 'Sur le fleuve', the last of the songs in the cycle, which concerns itself with death) is heard in the course of the film."

The original French version of Sans Soleil opens with the following quotation by Jean Racine from the second preface to his tragedy Bajazet (1672):

"L'éloignement des pays répare en quelque sorte la trop grande proximité des temps."
(The distance between the countries compensates somewhat for the excessive closeness of the times.)

Marker replaced this quote with the following one by T. S. Eliot from Ash Wednesday (1930) for the English version of the film:

"Because I know that time is always time
And place is always and only place"...

(And what is actual is actual only for one time
And only for one place.)

== Production ==
Sans Soleil contains some stock footage, clips from Japanese films and television, and a few excerpts from other films. The original documentary footage was filmed by Marker with a 16mm Beaulieu silent film camera in conjunction with a non-sync portable tape recorder; the film contains no synchronous sound. Some of the stock footage shots were colourized with an EMS Spectre video synthesizer. A number of sequences in Sans Soleil are borrowed from other filmmakers who are not mentioned until the film's credits, except the footage of the Icelandic volcano which is accredited in narration to Haroun Tazieff.

The filmmakers whose footage was used who were not mentioned in the narration are Sana Na N'Hada, Jean-Michel Humeau, Mario Marret, Eugenio Bentivoglio and Daniele Tessier. Pierre Camus was an assistant director; Anne-Marie L'Hote and Catherine Adda, assistant editors; Antoine Bonfanti and Paul Bertault, mixing.

The film was assembled largely in the 1970s, a period when Marker was part of a political commune and preferred to downplay his authorial signature, which may partly explain why he is represented in the film by Sandor Krasna's letters. The title "Conception and editing: Chris Marker," at the end of the credits, is the only indication that Sans Soleil is his film.

== Release ==
New Yorker Films released the film in the United States.

== Influences ==
The sequence in San Francisco references Alfred Hitchcock's 1958 film Vertigo and Marker's own 1962 film La Jetée. Marker's use of the name "The Zone" to describe the space in which Hayao Yamaneko's images are transformed is a homage to Stalker, a 1979 film by Andrei Tarkovsky, as noted in one of the letters read in the film.

English rock band Kasabian used a sound clip from the documentary in their 2009 album West Ryder Pauper Lunatic Asylum at the beginning of the song "West Ryder Silver Bullet".

== Reception ==
Sans Soleil has received critical acclaim, and has appeared in many "best films" lists:

- "From Toy Story to Psycho: the 100 greatest films of all time" (The Daily Telegraph, 2019): #62
- "Critics’ 50 Greatest Documentaries of All Time" (Sight & Sound, 2014): #3

However, not all critics have been so positive. In The Guardian, Peter Bradshaw awarded it 3 stars out of 5, saying it was "sometimes perplexing, often intriguing, occasionally redundant. The modified video images of urban commotion and guerrilla warfare, together with Moog-synth score, look a bit quaint." In The New York Times, Vincent Canby was negative, saying "Mr. Marker pretends to be examining the quality of contemporary life, though what he actually is doing is examining his own, not always coherent or especially interesting reactions to our world. Sans Soleil is a totally self-absorbed movie that closes out all but the most devoted Marker students."

By 2022 Sans Soleil had climbed to 59th on the BFI Greatest Films of all time list in the critics list and 72nd in the Directors poll.
