= Night (Mussorgsky song) =

"Night" (Ночь/Noch') is a Russian art song by composer Modest Mussorgsky. It is the composer's only full setting of a Pushkin verse, and one of only two Pushkin settings, along with the song "Magpie". The song exists in two versions, the original being written in 1864.

The text of the poem begins "Мой голос для тебя и ласковый и томный..", in English translation: "My voice for thee, my love, with languorous caresses, Disturbs the solemn peace the midnight dark possesses". The poem was also set by Anton Rubinstein.

== Selected recordings ==
- "Noch'" Galina Vishnevskaya London Symphony Orchestra, Igor Markevitch, recorded 26 August 1962
- Olga Borodina
- Joan Rodgers with Malcolm Martineau
