= Arseny Golenishchev-Kutuzov =

Russian writer (1848–1913)

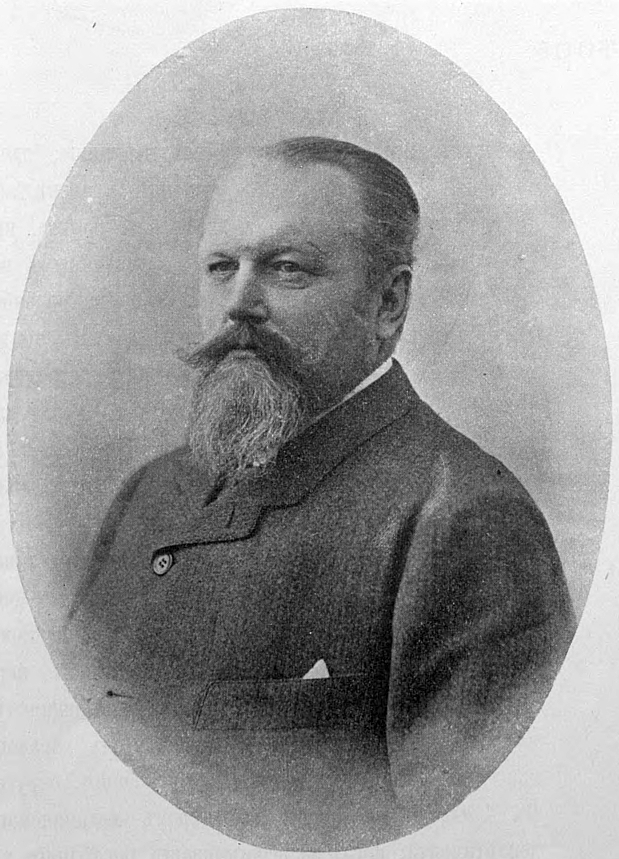

Count Arseny Arkadyevich Golenishchev-Kutuzov (Russian: Арсе́ний Арка́дьевич Голени́щев-Куту́зов, IPA: [ɐrˈsʲenʲɪj ɐrˈkadʲjɪvʲɪdʑ ɡəlʲɪˈnʲiɕːɪf kʊˈtuzəf]; 1848–1913), was a Russian poet known in part for writing the texts of Modest Mussorgsky's two song cycles of the 1870s: Sunless and Songs and Dances of Death.

He was the son of Arkadii Pavlovich Golenischev-Kutuzov (1812-1859), a senator and state secretary for the Kingdom of Poland, and the grandson of Pavel Vassiliyevich Golenischev-Kutuzov (1772-1843), governor-general of St. Petersburg 1825-1830 (the latter is not to be confused with field marshal Mikhail Illarionovich Goleníschev-Kutúzov who commanded the Russian forces against the Napoleon invasion in Russia in 1812, and who came from a younger noble branch of the family).
