= Songs and Dances of Death =

Song cycle by Modest Mussorgsky

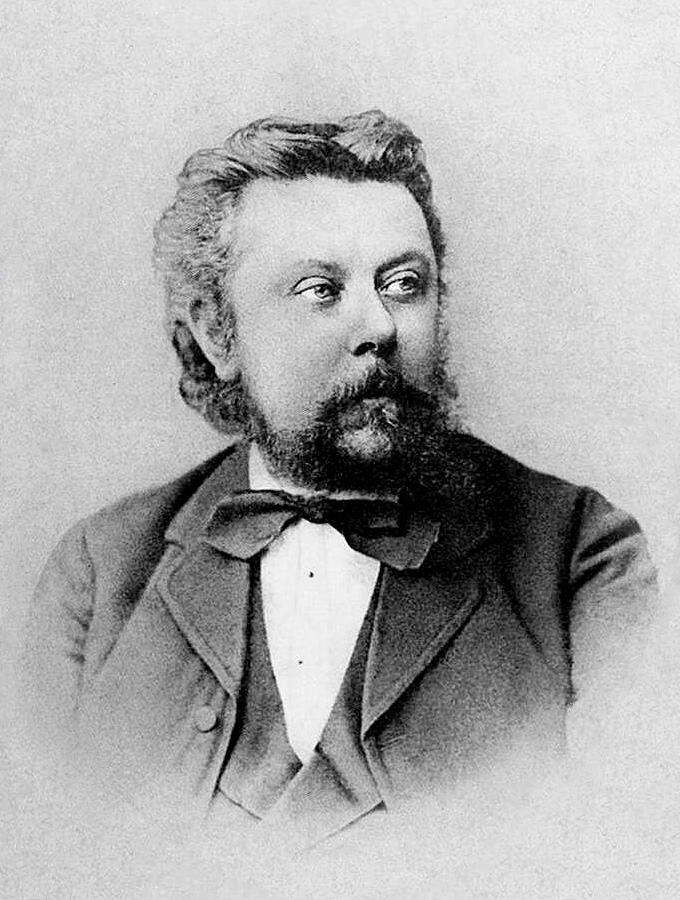
Mussorgsky in 1874

Songs and Dances of Death (Russian: Песни и пляски смерти, Pesni i plyaski smerti) is a song cycle for voice (usually bass or bass-baritone) and piano by Modest Petrovich Mussorgsky, written in the mid-1870s, to poems by Arseny Golenishchev-Kutuzov, a relative of the composer.

Each song deals with death in a poetic manner although the depictions are realistic in that they reflect experiences not uncommon in 19th century Russia: child death, death in youth, drunken misadventure and war.

The song cycle is considered Mussorgsky's masterpiece in the genre.

== Songs ==
Songs and Dances of Death consists of four individual songs, as follows:

1. Lullaby (Колыбельная) (14 April 1875) (in C minor–A minor)

A mother in a peasant hut cradles her sick child, who grows more feverish. Death appears, and tries to console the frantic mother and her child. The mother's lines in the song are marked by agitato markings and sixteenth-note rests indicating her fear and panic. In contrast, Death's lines are slow and deliberate, marked with lento and tranquillo markings. Each of Death's interjections ends with a "lullaby" motive directed to the child. Eventually, the mother accepts her child's fate, and allows Death to rock the child to eternal sleep.

2. Serenade (Серенада) (11 May 1875) (in G minor–F♯ minor)

The knightly figure of Death sings a serenade outside the window of a dying adolescent girl, Death acts as both the wooer and the wooed, simultaneously attempting to "seduce" the dying girl with the beauty of his serenade as he is grotesquely seduced by the dying girl's sickly pallor.

3. Trepak (Трепак) (17 February 1875) (in D minor–A♭ major)

A drunken peasant stumbles outside into the snow and becomes caught in a blizzard. The figure of Death invites him to dance a folk-dance called the Trepak. In this song, Death is first portrayed as a terror, as the fierce blizzard envelops the peasant, then as a seducer, as she speaks sweet words to the peasant to convince him to lie down in the snow. In the final section of the song, Death acts as a comforter, singing a lullaby of summer days as the man freezes to death.

4. The Field Marshal (Полководец) (5 June 1877) (in E♭ minor–D minor)

After a narrative depiction of a bloody battle, The figure of Death appears as an officer to survey the aftermath, illuminated by the moon. She addresses the dead troops, tells them that while they were enemies in life, they are comrades in death, and she is their commanding officer. She assures them that although the living will forget about them, she will remember them, and will harden the earth above them so that they cannot be resurrected.

== Recordings ==
The Songs and Dances of Death have been recorded by numerous vocalists, including Vladimir Rosing, George London, Ferruccio Furlanetto, Nicolai Ghiaurov, Boris Christoff, Kim Borg, Martti Talvela (twice: once with piano accompaniment and once with full orchestra), Matti Salminen, Anatoly Kotcherga, Paata Burchuladze, Aage Haugland, Dmitri Hvorostovsky, Ewa Podles, Irina Arkhipova, Galina Vishnevskaya, Brigitte Fassbaender, Anja Silja and Yevgeny Nesterenko. Odekhiren Amaize

== Versions by others ==
- 1882, Alexander Glazunov and Nikolai Rimsky-Korsakov

The songs were first orchestrated by Glazunov (Nos. 1 and 3) and Rimsky-Korsakov (Nos. 2 and 4) shortly after Mussorgsky's death. They were published in 1882. Mussorgsky had intended to orchestrate the cycle himself but never realised the ambition. In the Glazunov/Rimsky-Korsakov orchestration, 'Trepak' is first.

- 1962, Dmitri Shostakovich

Shostakovich orchestrated the whole cycle for the soprano Galina Vishnevskaya and dedicated it to her. Seven years later, noting that he wanted to continue Mussorgsky's "too short" set of songs, he wrote his Fourteenth Symphony for soprano, bass and chamber orchestra, adding to the musical gallery of death's appearances. The Shostakovich orchestration had a substantial influence on many of his later works, and has since been adapted for bass and baritone voices.

- 1966 (pub.), Samuil Feinberg

Serenade transcribed for solo piano.

- 1983, Edison Denisov

Version for bass and orchestra, premiered and recorded by Yevgeny Nesterenko with Gennady Rozhdestvensky conducting in 1985.

- 1984, Kalevi Aho

Version for bass and orchestra.

- 1994, Ramon Lazkano

Version for voice and small orchestra, premiered by Dmitri Hvorostovsky with Louis Langrée conducting in the same year.

- 2007, Alexander Raskatov

Version for bass (or tenor) and orchestra, with 3 optional interludes (Steady Time) between the movements; premiered by Robert Holl with Reinbert de Leeuw conducting in the same year.

- 2012, Peter Breiner

Version for orchestra only, recorded by him and the New Zealand Symphony Orchestra on Naxos.
