= The Nursery =

Song cycle by Modest Mussorgsky

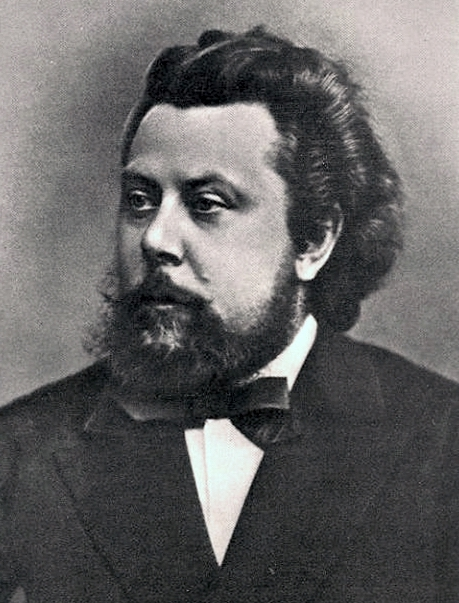
Musorgsky in 1870

The Nursery (Russian: Детская, Detskaya, literally Children's [Room]) is a song cycle by the Russian composer Modest Mussorgsky set to his own lyrics, composed between 1868 and 1872. The cycle was published in two series. Only the first two songs survive of the second series.

== Synopses ==
=== Series 1: The Nursery ===
1. With Nanny (B♭ major)

A child begs the nurse to tell a story, first about the awful bogey-man who carries naughty children into the forest and devours them, and later about a fairy-tale Tsar and Tsaritsa who live in a rich palace by the sea.

2. In the Corner (F major)

The nurse berates Mishenka for spoiling her knitting and sends him to the corner.

3. The Beetle (F major)

A child relates to the nurse an encounter with a large beetle.

4. With the Doll (A♭ major)

A child sings a lullaby to her doll.

5. At Bedtime (A♭ major)

A child recites his prayers.

=== Series 2: At the Dacha ===
The two surviving songs of Series 2 (Russian: «На Даче», Na Dache, At the Dacha) along with a new edition of the five songs of Series 1, were published by V. Bessel and Co. in 1908.

1. Ride on a Hobby Horse (D♭ major)

A child relating his imaginary journey to Yukki on a stick (hobby horse) falls, injures himself, and resumes his journey.

2. The Cat 'Sailor' (A major)

A child foils the attempt by Matros ("Sailor") the cat to catch the family canary.

3. Dream

A child's fantastic dream

4. [Unknown title]

A quarrel between two children

== Publication history ==
Series	Title	Translation	Date	Dedication	Pub. Date	Publisher
Детская 1	С няней	With Nanny	1868-04-26	Aleksandr Dargomyzhsky	1872	Bessel
Детская 2	В углу	In the Corner	1870-09-30	Viktor Gartman	1872	Bessel
Детская 3	Жук	The Beetle	1870-10-18	Vladimir Stasov	1872	Bessel
Детская 4	С куклой	With the Doll	1870-12-18	Tanyushka and Goga Musorgsky	1872	Bessel
Детская 5	На сон грядущий	At Bedtime	1870-12-18	Sasha Cui	1872	Bessel
На Даче 1	Поехал на палочке	Ride on a Hobby Horse	1872-09-14		1882	Bessel
На Даче 2	Кот Матрос	The Cat 'Sailor'	1872-08-15		1882	Bessel
На Даче 3	Сон	Dream	Projected	–	–	–
На Даче 4	[Unknown]	[Unknown]	Projected	–	–	–

== Notes ==
- The song cycle was arranged for soprano and orchestra by Edison Denisov in 1976 and premiered in 1979.
- An orchestral (no voice) version was arranged by Peter Breiner and recorded in 2012 by him with the New Zealand Symphony Orchestra on Naxos.
- A version with orchestral accompaniment was arranged by the Israeli composer Noam Sheriff.
