= Karevo, Pskov Oblast =

Human settlement in Kunyinsky District, Pskov Oblast, Russia

Karevo Карево
- Village
- Location within Pskov Oblast Location within Russia
- Coordinates: 56°16′N 31°16′E
- Country: Russia
- Region: Pskov Oblast
- District: Kunyinsky District
- Time zone: UTC+3:00

Karevo (Russian: Карево) is a rural locality (a village) in Kunyinsky District, Pskov Oblast, Russia. Included as a part of Zhizhitsk Volost.

== Geography ==
Located 5 km west from the center of Volost, village Zhizhitsa, on a North-Western shore of Kadosno lake.

== Population ==
In 2001, the population numbered 31 people.

== History ==
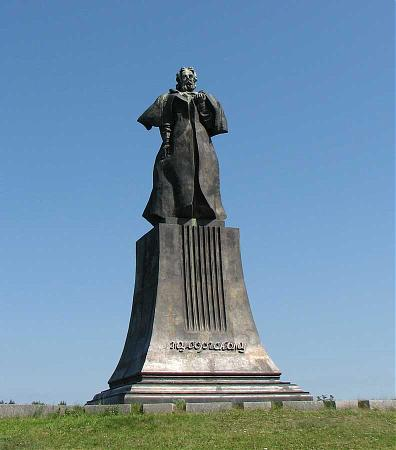
Modest Mussorgsky monument in Karevo, est. 1989

Karevo is a birthplace of great Russian composer Modest Mussorgsky. The village Naumovo is a place of his museum-estate.
