= Karevo, Vladimir Oblast =

Karevo Карево
- Village
- Location within Vladimir Oblast Location within Russia
- Coordinates: 55°45′N 41°16′E
- Country: Russia
- Region: Vladimir Oblast
- District: Sudogodsky District
- Time zone: UTC+3:00

Karevo (Russian: Карево) is a rural locality (a village) in Moshokskoye Rural Settlement, Sudogodsky District, Vladimir Oblast, Russia. The population was 15 as of 2010.

== Geography ==
Karevo is located 40 km southeast of Sudogda (the district's administrative centre) by road. Goryachevo is the nearest rural locality.
