= The Destruction of Sennacherib =

1815 poem by Lord Byron

- by Lord Byron
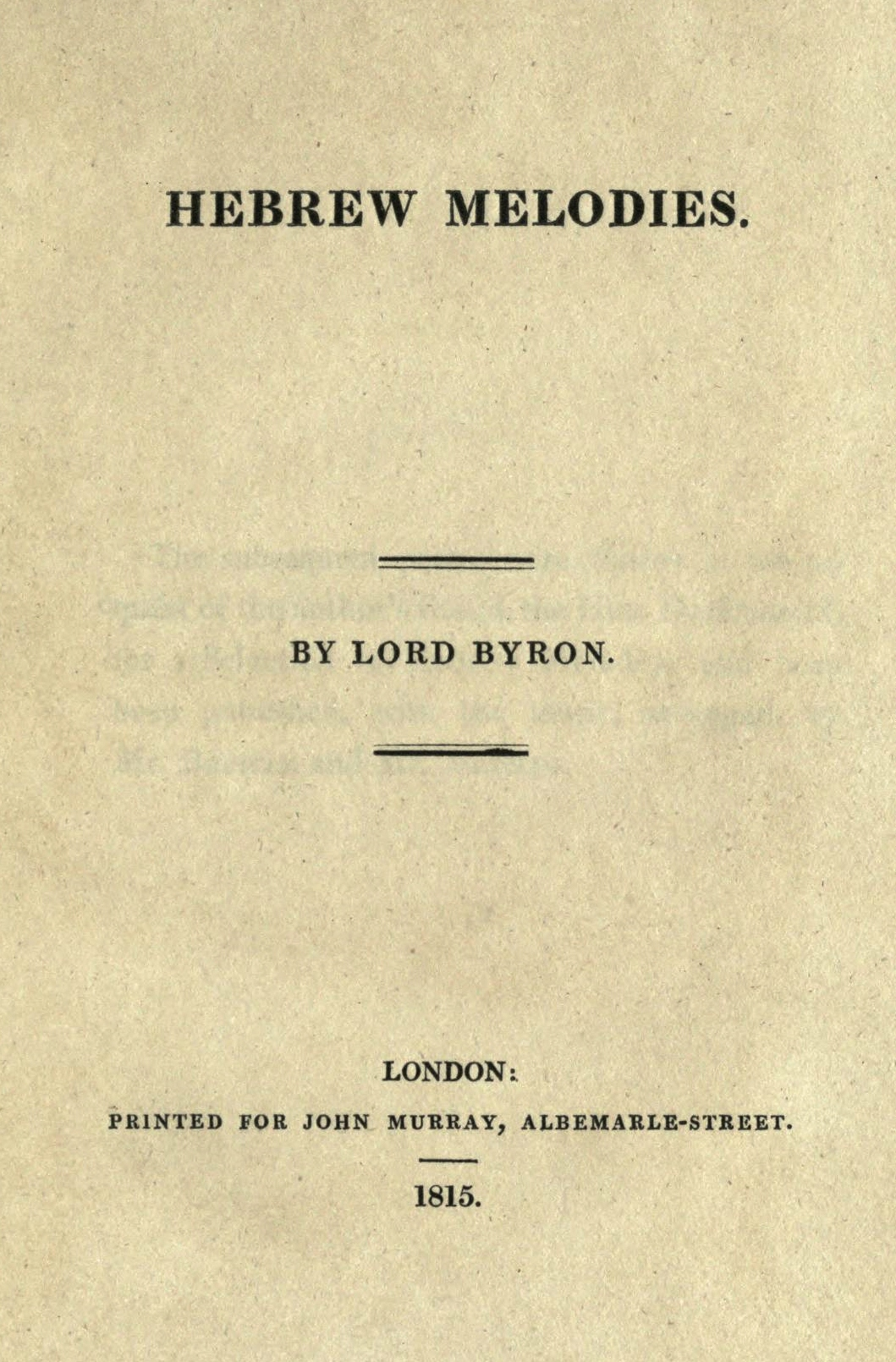
- First published in: Hebrew Melodies
- Country: UK
- Language: English
- Subject: Assyrian siege of Jerusalem
- Rhyme scheme: Couplet
- Publication date: 1815
- Lines: 24
- Metre: Anapestic tetrameter

Full text
- The Works of Lord Byron (ed. Coleridge, Prothero)/Poetry/Volume 3/Hebrew Melodies/The Destruction of Sennacherib at Wikisource

The Destruction of Sennacherib

The Assyrian came down like the wolf on the fold,
And his cohorts were gleaming in purple and gold;
And the sheen of their spears was like stars on the sea,
When the blue wave rolls nightly on deep Galilee.

Like the leaves of the forest when Summer is green,
That host with their banners at sunset were seen:
Like the leaves of the forest when Autumn hath blown,
That host on the morrow lay wither'd and strown.

For the Angel of Death spread his wings on the blast,
And breathed in the face of the foe as he pass'd;
And the eyes of the sleepers wax'd deadly and chill,
And their hearts but once heaved, and for ever grew still!

And there lay the steed with his nostril all wide,
But through it there roll'd not the breath of his pride:
And the foam of his gasping lay white on the turf,
And cold as the spray of the rock-beating surf.

And there lay the rider distorted and pale,
With the dew on his brow and the rust on his mail;
And the tents were all silent, the banners alone,
The lances unlifted, the trumpet unblown.

And the widows of Ashur are loud in their wail,
And the idols are broke in the temple of Baal;
And the might of the Gentile, unsmote by the sword,
Hath melted like snow in the glance of the Lord!

— Lord Byron

"The Destruction of Sennacherib" is a poem by Lord Byron first published in 1815 in his Hebrew Melodies (in which it was titled The Destruction of Semnacherib).

The poem is based on the biblical account of the historical Assyrian siege of Jerusalem in 701 BC by Assyrian king Sennacherib, as described in 2 Kings 18–19, Isaiah 36–37.

The rhythm of the poem has a feel of the beat of a galloping horse's hooves (an anapestic tetrameter) as the Assyrian rides into battle.

== Biblical story ==
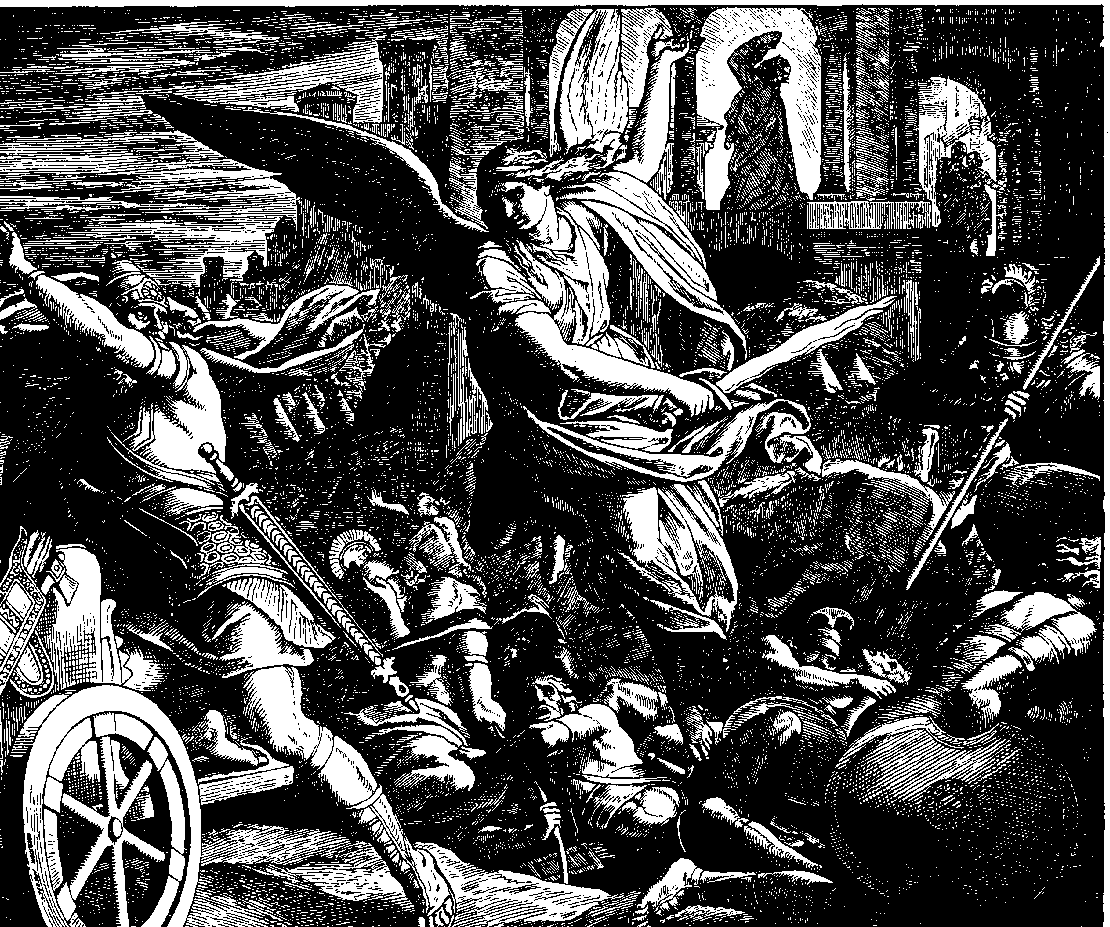
Jerusalem Delivered from Sennacherib, 1860 woodcut by Julius Schnorr von Karolsfeld

The poem relates to the Biblical account of Sennacherib's attempted siege of Jerusalem. According to the Bible record in 2 Kings 18:13, the Assyrian army came "against all the fenced cities of Judah, and took them." When the Assyrians were besieging Jerusalem, Hezekiah prayed to Jehovah in the Temple, and Isaiah sent the reply from Jehovah to Hezekiah: "I will defend this city, to save it, for mine own sake, and for my servant David's sake" (2 Kings 19:34), and during the following night the Angel of the Lord (מַלְאַךְ יְהוָה) "smote in the camp of the Assyrians an hundred fourscore and five thousand" (i.e. 185,000), so by morning most of the Assyrian army was found "as dead corpses" (2 Kings 19:35), and Sennacherib went back to Nineveh. The Assyrian annals do mention tribute paid by Hezekiah to Sennacherib (as recorded in 2 Kings 18), and the Assyrian Siege of Jerusalem (dated 701 BC), but omits any mention of its failure or the loss of the army.

== Reception ==
The poem was popular in Victorian England and, when the first Australian cricket team to tour England defeated a strong MCC team, including W. G. Grace, at Lord's on 27 May 1878, the satirical magazine Punch celebrated by publishing a parody of the poem including a wry commentary on Grace's contribution:

The Australians came down like a wolf on the fold,
The Marylebone cracks for a trifle were bowled;
Our Grace before dinner was very soon done,
And Grace after dinner did not get a run.

Mark Twain has references to this poem throughout his works, from his early newspaper sketches to The Adventures of Tom Sawyer, and it is mentioned often in biographies of him, making it clear that it was important to him.

Ogden Nash's "Very Like a Whale", a humorous complaint about poetical metaphors, uses this poem for its inspiration:

...Now then, this particular Assyrian, the one whose cohorts were gleaming in purple and gold,
Just what does the poet mean when he says he came down like a wolf on the fold?
In heaven and earth more than is dreamed of in our philosophy there are a great many things.
But I don't imagine that among them there is a wolf with purple and gold cohorts or purple and gold anythings.
No, no, Lord Byron, before I'll believe that this Assyrian was actually like a wolf I must have some kind of proof;
Did he run on all fours and did he have a hairy tail and a big red mouth and big white teeth and did he say Woof woof woof?...

== In popular culture ==
- The student body of the University of Washington voted to adopt the colors purple and gold as the school's official color scheme in 1896 with a specific link to Lord Byron's poem.
- The first two lines of the poem are often alluded to in P. G. Wodehouse's stories by Bertie Wooster. As in the novel Joy in the Morning, in this interaction between Wooster and his valet Jeeves: "One false step, and he'll swoop on me like the – who was it who came down like a wolf on the fold?"—"The Assyrian, sir."
- In the spy comedy Archer, the character of Pam Poovey has an excerpt from the poem tattooed down her back.
- In the Terry Pratchett novel, Going Postal, the character Adora Belle Dearheart quotes a variation of the opening lines to Moist von Lipwig, replacing 'the Assyrian' with 'the Postman'.

== Sources ==
- Ashton, Thomas L. (1972). Byron's Hebrew Melodies. London: Routledge and Kegan Paul. ISBN 0710071736
- Byron, George Gordon and Nathan, Isaac, ed. Frederick Burwick and Paul Douglass (1988), A Selection of Hebrew Melodies, Ancient and Modern, By Isaac Nathan and Lord Byron. Tuscaloosa and London: University of Alabama Press. ISBN 0-8173-0373-1
- Conway, David (2012). Jewry in Music: Entry to the Profession from the Enlightenment to Richard Wagner. Cambridge: Cambridge University Press. ISBN 978-1-316-63960-3.

== Bibliography ==
- Altham, H S (1962). A History of Cricket, Volume 1 (to 1914). George Allen & Unwin.
- Byron, George Gordon, Lord (1905). The Complete Poetical Works (Cambridge ed.). Boston: Houghton Mifflin. p. 222.
- Nims, John Frederick (1981). The Harper Anthology of Poetry. Harper & Row. p. 611. ISBN 978-0-06-044847-9. Retrieved 3 June 2013.
