= Sunless (song cycle) =

Song cycle by Modest Mussorgsky

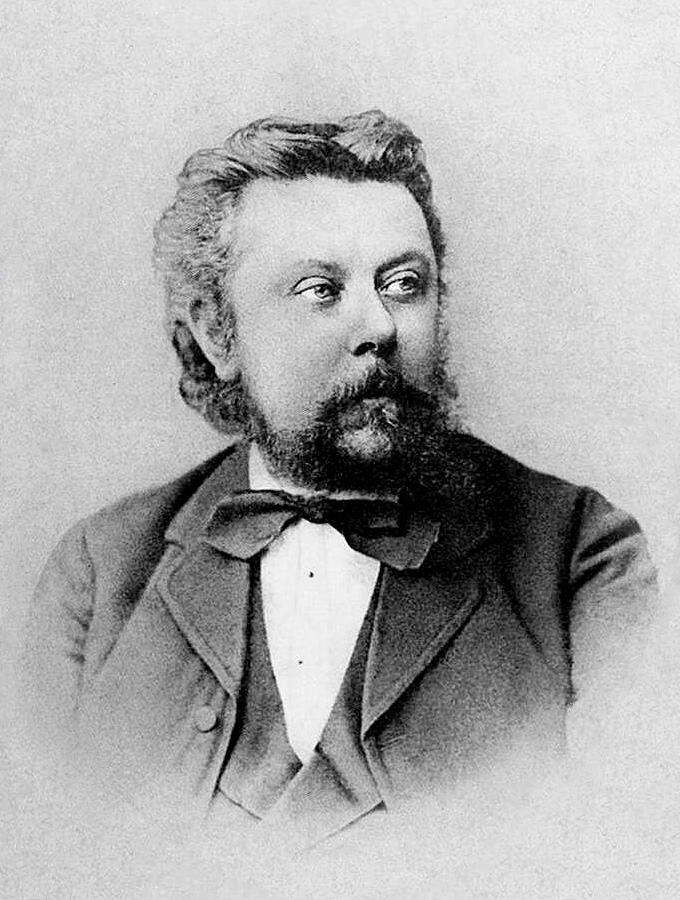
Mussorgsky in 1874

Sunless (Russian: Без солнца, Bez Solntsa, literally Without Sun) is a song cycle by Modest Petrovich Mussorgsky, written in 1874 and arranged for voice and piano. The song cycle is set to poems by Arseny Golenishchev-Kutuzov, a relative of the composer.

Mussorgsky chose six unpublished poems for the cycle by Golenishchev-Kutuzov, whom he had recently met. These poems comprise a loose narrative that is nostalgic, surreal, and pessimistic, dwelling upon lost love, romantic rejection, and doubts from the protagonist's past, culminating in a contemplation of death. This narrative is believed to be in part autobiographical; musicologist Richard Taruskin characterized it as the voice of "a neurotically self-absorbed, broken-down aristocrat." Scholars have speculated that this pessimism may have arisen from the poor reception of Mussorgsky's opera Boris Godunov, the death of Mussorgsky's friends Viktor Gartmann and Nadezhda Opochinina in 1873-74, tensions in Mussorgsky's relationship with Golenishchev-Kutuzov, and/or the class tensions of the decade.

Sunless was described by scholar Simon Perry as "aesthetically and stylistically anomalous" among Mussorgsky's work, makes use of symmetrical or “synthetic” chromaticism.

The song cycle, like Boris Godunov, met a scathing reception, and Mussorgsky did not mention it in his autobiography.

== Song titles ==
The individual song titles are as follows:

1. "В четырех стенах" ("Within four walls") – D major
2. "Меня в толпе ты не узнала" ("Thou didst not know me in the crowd") – D major
3. "Окончен праздный шумный день" ("The noisy festival day is ended") – C major
4. "Скучай" ("Boredom: For the album of a fashionable young lady") – B minor
5. "Элегия" ("Elegy") – B minor, ending in F♯ minor
6. "Над рекой" ("By the River") – C♯ major

== In popular culture ==
- The piece was featured and discussed in the film-essay Sans Soleil by director Chris Marker, receiving an electronic experimental interpretation by composer Isao Tomita.
