= Modest Mussorgsky =

Russian composer (1839–1881)

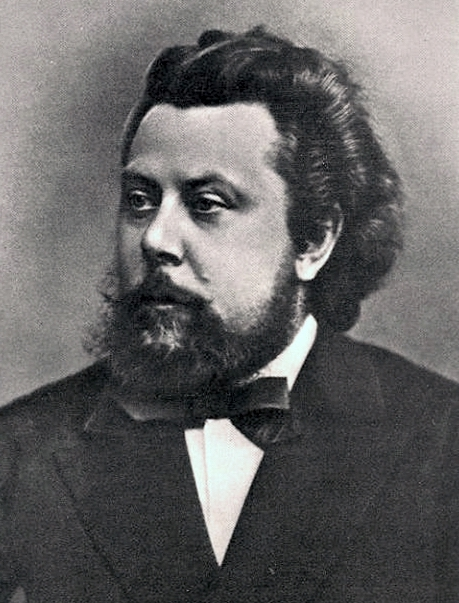
Mussorgsky, c. 1870

Modest Petrovich Mussorgsky (Note: In this name that follows East Slavic naming customs, the patronymic is Petrovich and the family name is Mussorgsky.) (/mʊˈsɔːrɡski, -ˈzɔːrɡ-/; Russian: Модест Петрович Мусоргский, romanized: Modest Petrovich Musorgsky; (Note: In his day, the name was written Модестъ Петровичъ Мусоргскій.) (Note: The BGN/PCGN transliteration of Russian is used for his name here. ALA-LC system: Modest Petrovich Musorgskiĭ. ISO 9: Modest Petrovič Musorgskij.) IPA: [mɐˈdɛst pʲɪˈtrovʲɪtɕ ˈmusərkskʲɪj]; 21 March [O.S. 9 March] 1839 – 28 March [O.S. 16 March] 1881) was a Russian composer, one of the group known as "The Five." He was an innovator of Russian music in the Romantic period and strove to achieve a uniquely Russian musical identity, often in deliberate defiance of the established conventions of Western music.

Many of Mussorgsky's works were inspired by Russian history, Russian folklore, and other national themes. Such works include the opera Boris Godunov, the orchestral tone poem Night on Bald Mountain and the piano suite Pictures at an Exhibition.

For many years, Mussorgsky's works were mainly known in versions revised or completed by other composers. Many of his most important compositions have posthumously come into their own in their original forms, and some of the original scores are now also available.

At the State Institute for Art Studies in Moscow, M. P. Musorgsky's Complete Works: Academic Edition is being published. As of 2026, six volumes have been issued, including the opera Boris Godunov: two volumes of the vocal score (2020) and four volumes of the full score (2025). The vocal score was prepared by Nadezhda Teterina and Evgeny Levashev. The full score was prepared by Evgeny Levashev, Nadezhda Teterina, and Roman Berchenko.

== Name ==
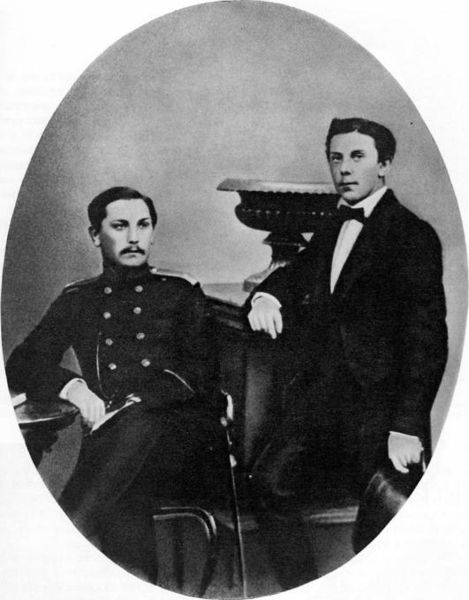
The aristocratic Mussorgsky brothers—Filaret (also known as "Yevgeniy", left), and Modest (right) in 1858

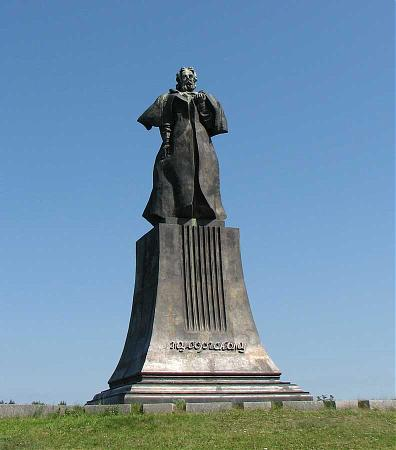
Monument on the site of the Mussorgsky family house in Karevo, Pskov Oblast

The spelling and pronunciation of the composer's name have caused some confusion.

The family name derives from a 15th- or 16th-century ancestor, Roman Vasilyevich Monastyryov, who appears in the Velvet Book, the 17th-century genealogy of Russian boyars. Roman Vasilyevich bore the nickname "Musorga" (from Greek: μουσουργός, romanized: musurgos, meaning "music maker"), and was the grandfather of the first Mussorgsky. The composer could trace his lineage to Rurik, the legendary ninth-century prince of Novgorod and founder of the Russian monarchy.

In Mussorgsky family documents, the spelling of the name varies: "Musarskiy", "Muserskiy", "Muserskoy", "Musirskoy", "Musorskiy", and "Musurskiy". The baptismal record gives the composer's name as "Muserskiy".

In early (up to 1858) letters to Mily Balakirev, the composer signed his name "Musorskiy" (Мусoрский). The "g" made its first appearance in a letter to Balakirev in 1863. Mussorgsky used this new spelling (Мусoргскій, Musorgskiy) to the end of his life, but occasionally reverted to the earlier "Musorskiy". The addition of the "g" to the name was likely initiated by the composer's elder brother Filaret to obscure the resemblance of the name's root to an unsavory Russian word:

мусoр (músor) — n. m. debris, rubbish, refuse

Mussorgsky apparently did not take the new spelling seriously and played on the "rubbish" connection in letters to Vladimir Stasov and to Stasov's family, routinely signing his name Musoryanin, roughly "garbage-dweller" (compare dvoryanin: "nobleman").

The first syllable of the name originally received the stress (i.e., MÚS-ər-skiy), and does so to this day in Russia, including the composer's home district. The mutability of the second-syllable vowel in the versions of the name mentioned above gives evidence that this syllable did not receive the stress.

The addition of the "g" and the accompanying shift in stress to the second syllable (i.e., Mu-SÓRK-skiy), sometimes described as a Polish variant, was supported by Filaret Mussorgsky's descendants until his line ended in the 20th century. Their example was followed by many influential Russians, such as Fyodor Shalyapin, Nikolay Golovanov, and Tikhon Khrennikov, who, perhaps dismayed that the great composer's name was "reminiscent of garbage", supported the second-syllable stress that has also become entrenched in the West.

The Western convention of doubling the first "s", which is not observed in scholarly literature (e.g., The Grove Dictionary of Music and Musicians), likely arose because in many Western European languages a single intervocalic /s/ often becomes voiced to /z/ (as in "music"), unlike in Slavic languages where the intervocalic /s/ is always unvoiced. Doubling the consonant thus reinforces its voiceless sibilant /s/ sound.

"Modest" is the Russian form of the name "Modestus" which means "moderate" or "restrained" in Late Latin. He was called "Modinka" (Модинька), diminutive form with the stressed O, by his close friends and relatives.

== Life ==
=== Early years ===
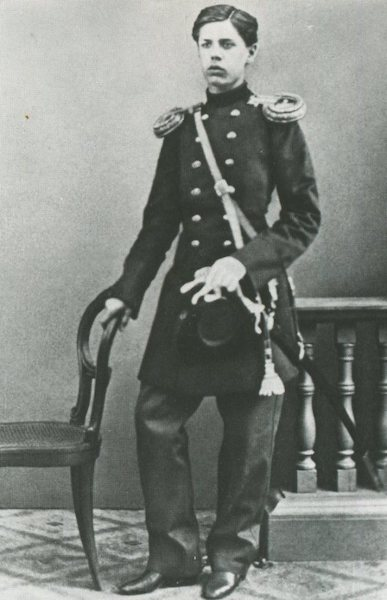
Mussorgsky in 1856 as a cadet in the Preobrazhensky Regiment of the Imperial Guard

Mussorgsky was born in Karevo, Toropets Uyezd, Pskov Governorate, Russian Empire, 400 km (250 mi) south of Saint Petersburg. His wealthy and land-owning family, the noble family of Mussorgsky, is reputedly descended from Rurik, through the sovereign princes of Smolensk. His mother, Julia Chirikova, was the daughter of a comparatively non-rich nobleman. Modest's paternal grandmother Irina used to be a serf that could be sold without land in his grandfather's estate. (Note: Modest Mussorgsky's father Peter was eventually adopted by his biological father Alexei, Mussorgsky's grandfather, after the official marriage of Alexei and his domestic serf Irina following her emancipation (it was long time before the Emancipation reform of 1861). Irina was an unordinary woman, the best dancer-singer in the estate. Her strong character had promoted her to a 'manager of all keys' position and status of the estate owner's legitimate wife. Unfortunately, Peter's original illegitimate status (his date of birth is lost, legitimized 9 May 1820, died in 1854) was considered a disgrace which had prevented him from making a successful military career according to the Mussorgsky family tradition.) At age six, Mussorgsky began receiving piano lessons from his mother, herself a trained pianist. His progress was sufficiently rapid that three years later, he was able to perform a John Field concerto and works by Franz Liszt for family and friends. At age 10, Mussorgsky and his brother were taken to Saint Petersburg to study at the elite German language Petrischule (St. Peter's School). While there, Modest studied the piano with Anton Gerke. In 1852, the 12-year-old Mussorgsky published a piano piece titled "Porte-enseigne Polka" at his father's expense.

Mussorgsky's parents planned the move to Saint Petersburg so that both their sons would renew the family tradition of military service. Mussorgsky entered the Cadet School of the Guards at age 13. Controversy had arisen over the educational attitudes at the time of both this institute and its director, General Sutgof. All agreed the Cadet School could be a brutal place, especially for new recruits. More tellingly for Mussorgsky, it was likely where he began his eventual path to alcoholism. According to a former student, singer and composer Nikolai Kompaneisky, Sutgof "was proud when a cadet returned from leave drunk with champagne."

Music still remained important to Mussorgsky. Sutgof's daughter was also a pupil of Gerke, and Mussorgsky was allowed to attend lessons with her. His skills as a pianist made Mussorgsky much in demand by fellow-cadets; for them, he would play dances interspersed with his own improvisations. In 1856, Mussorgsky – who had developed a strong interest in history and studied German philosophy – graduated from the Cadet School. Following family tradition, he received a commission with the Preobrazhensky Regiment, the foremost regiment of the Russian Imperial Guard.

=== Maturity ===
In October 1856, the 17-year-old Mussorgsky met the 22-year-old Alexander Borodin while both men served at a military hospital in Saint Petersburg. The two were soon on good terms. Borodin later remembered:

His little uniform was spic and span, close-fitting, his feet turned outwards, his hair smoothed down and greased, his nails perfectly cut, his hands well groomed like a lord's. His manners were elegant, aristocratic: his speech likewise, delivered through somewhat clenched teeth, interspersed with French phrases, was rather precious. There was a touch—though very moderate—of foppishness. His politeness and good manners were exceptional. The ladies made a fuss of him. He sat at the piano and, throwing up his hands coquettishly, played with extreme sweetness and grace (etc) extracts from Trovatore, Traviata, and so on, and around him buzzed in chorus: "Charmant, délicieux!" and suchlike. I met Modest Petrovich three or four times at Popov's in this way, both on duty and at the hospital."

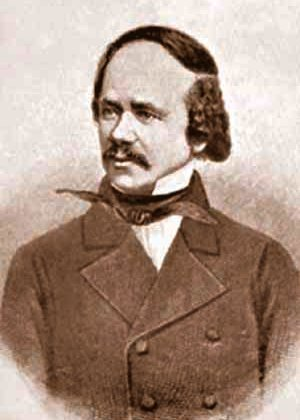
Alexander Dargomyzhsky

More portentous was Mussorgsky's introduction that winter to Alexander Dargomyzhsky, at that time the most important Russian composer after Mikhail Glinka. Dargomyzhsky was impressed with Mussorgsky's pianism. As a result, Mussorgsky became a fixture at Dargomyzhsky's soirées. There, as critic Vladimir Stasov later recalled, he began "his true musical life."

Over the next two years at Dargomyzhsky's, Mussorgsky met several figures of importance in Russia's cultural life, among them Stasov, César Cui (a fellow officer), and Mily Balakirev. Balakirev had an especially strong impact. Within days he took it upon himself to help shape Mussorgsky's fate as a composer. He recalled to Stasov, "Because I am not a theorist, I could not teach him harmony (as, for instance Rimsky-Korsakov now teaches it) ... [but] I explained to him the form of compositions, and to do this we played through both Beethoven symphonies [as piano duets] and much else (Schumann, Schubert, Glinka, and others), analyzing the form." Up to this point, Mussorgsky had known nothing but piano music; his knowledge of more radical recent music was virtually non-existent. Balakirev started filling these gaps in Mussorgsky's knowledge.

In 1858, within a few months of beginning his studies with Balakirev, Mussorgsky resigned his commission to devote himself entirely to music. He also suffered a painful crisis at this time. This may have had a spiritual component (in a letter to Balakirev the young man referred to "mysticism and cynical thoughts about the Deity"), but its exact nature will probably never be known. In 1859, the 20-year-old gained valuable theatrical experience by assisting in a production of Glinka's opera A Life for the Tsar on the Glebovo estate of a former singer and her wealthy husband; Mussorgsky also met Konstantin Lyadov (father of Anatoly Lyadov) and enjoyed a formative visit to Moscow – after which he professed love of "everything Russian". Mussorgsky and his brother were also inspired by the gothic script, they were using an "M" personal sign instead of family coat of arms, very similar to the symbols of the early Rurikids.

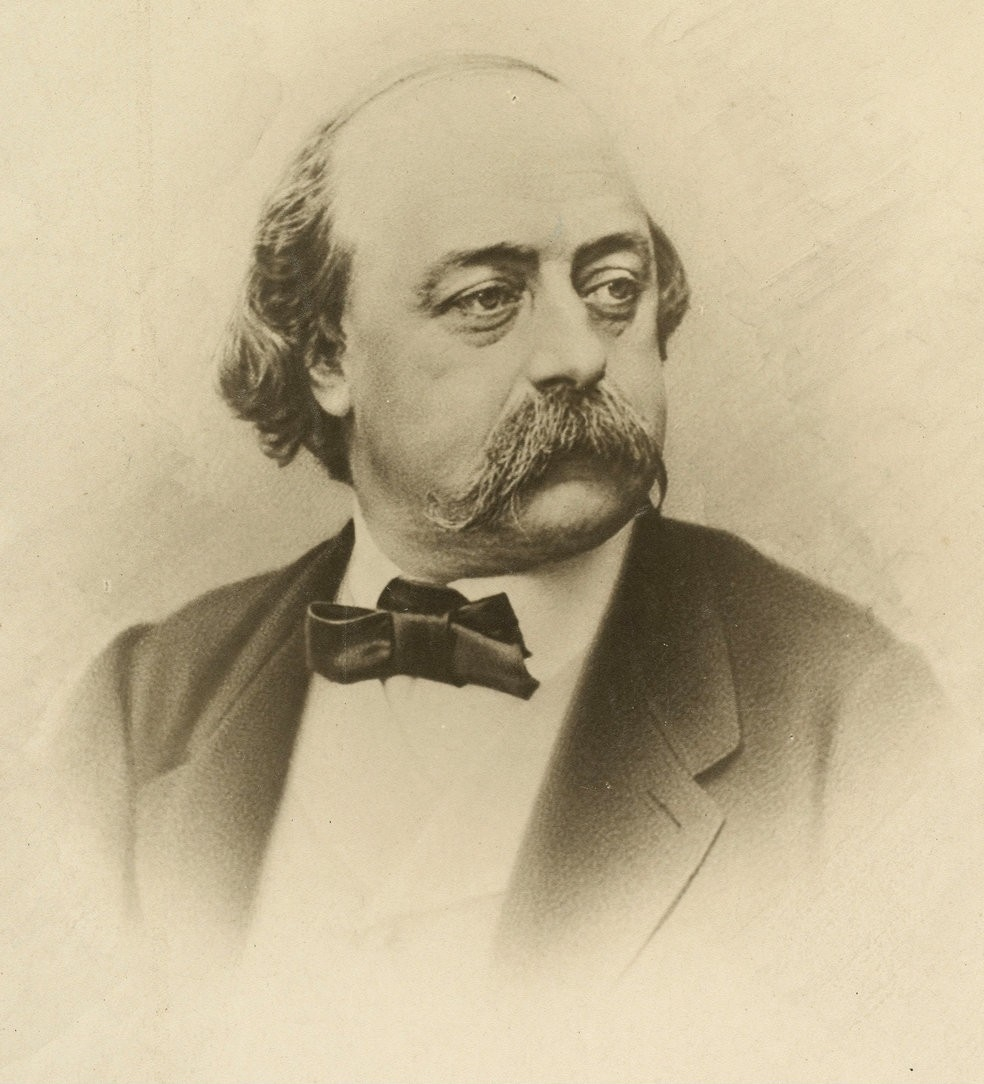
Gustave Flaubert. Mussorgsky started an opera based on his Salammbô but did not finish it.

Despite this epiphany, Mussorgsky's music leaned more toward foreign models; a four-hand piano sonata that he produced in 1860 contains his only movement in sonata form. Nor is any 'nationalistic' impulse easily discernible in the incidental music for Vladislav Ozerov's play Oedipus in Athens, on which he worked between the ages of 19 and 22 (and then abandoned unfinished), or in the Intermezzo in Modo Classico for piano solo (revised and orchestrated in 1867). The latter was the only important piece he composed between December 1860 and August 1863: the reasons for this probably lie in the painful re-emergence of his subjective crisis in 1860 and the purely objective difficulties which resulted from the emancipation of the serfs the following year – as a result of which the family was deprived of half its estate, and Mussorgsky had to spend a good deal of time in Karevo unsuccessfully attempting to stave off their looming impoverishment.

By this time, Mussorgsky had freed himself from the influence of Balakirev and was largely teaching himself. In 1863 he began an opera – Salammbô – on which he worked between 1863 and 1866 before losing interest in the project. During this period, he returned to Saint Petersburg and supported himself as a low-grade civil servant while living in a six-man "commune". In a heady artistic and intellectual atmosphere, he read and discussed a wide range of modern artistic and scientific ideas – including those of the provocative writer Chernyshevsky, known for the bold assertion that, in art, "form and content are opposites". Under such influences he came more and more to embrace the idea of artistic realism and all that it entailed, whether this concerned the responsibility to depict life "as it is truly lived"; the preoccupation with the lower strata of society; or the rejection of repeating, symmetrical musical forms as insufficiently true to the unrepeating, unpredictable course of "real life".

Night on Bald Mountain
Rimsky-Korsakov's edited version of the piece, performed by the Skidmore College Orchestra

"Real life" affected Mussorgsky painfully in 1865 when his mother died; at this point, the composer had his first serious bout of alcoholism, which forced him to leave the commune to stay with his brother. However, the 26-year-old was on the point of writing his first realistic songs (including "Hopak" and "Darling Savishna", both of them composed in 1866 and among his first "real" publications the following year). The year 1867 was also the one in which he finished the original orchestral version of his Night on Bald Mountain (which, Balakirev criticised and refused to conduct, with the result that it was never performed during Mussorgsky's lifetime).

=== Peak ===
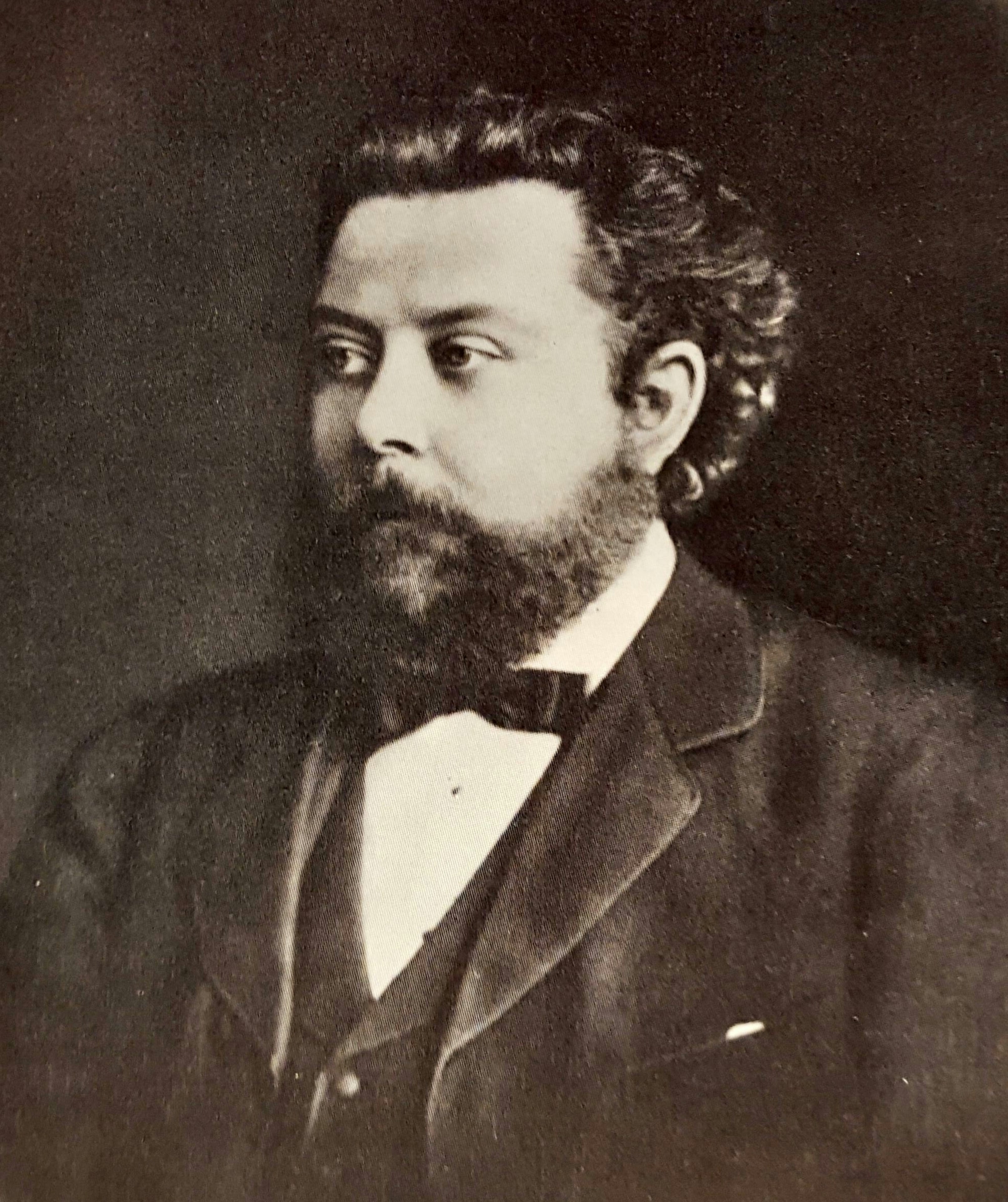
Mussorgsky in 1876

Mussorgsky's career as a civil servant was by no means stable or secure: though he was assigned to various posts and even received a promotion in these early years, Mussorgsky was declared "supernumerary" in 1867 – remaining "in service" but receiving no wages. However, decisive developments were occurring in his artistic life. Although it was in 1867 that Stasov first referred to the "kuchka" (Russian: кучка, lit. bunch, English: "The Five") of Russian composers loosely grouped around Balakirev, Mussorgsky was by then ceasing to seek Balakirev's approval and was moving closer to the older Alexander Dargomyzhsky. Inside The Five and its close companions, Mussorgsky was nicknamed as "Humour", Balakirev was "Power", and Rimsky-Korsakov was "Sincerity".

Since 1866, Dargomyzhsky had been working on his opera The Stone Guest, a version of the Don Juan story with a Pushkin text that he declared would be set "just as it stands, so that the inner truth of the text should not be distorted", and in a manner that abolished the "unrealistic" division between aria and recitative in favor of a continuous mode of syllabic but lyrically heightened declamation somewhere between the two.

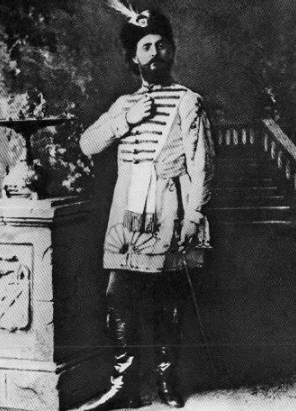
Fyodor Komissarzhevsky as The Pretender in Boris Godunov

Under the influence of this work (and the ideas of Georg Gottfried Gervinus, according to whom "the highest natural object of musical imitation is emotion, and the method of imitating emotion is to mimic speech"), Mussorgsky in 1868 rapidly set the first eleven scenes of Nikolai Gogol's play Marriage (Zhenitba), with his priority being to render into music the natural accents and patterns of the play's naturalistic and deliberately humdrum dialogue. This work marked an extreme position in Mussorgsky's pursuit of naturalistic word-setting: he abandoned it unorchestrated after reaching the end of his "Act 1", and though its characteristically "Mussorgskyian" declamation is to be heard in all his later vocal music, the naturalistic mode of vocal writing more and more became merely one expressive element among many.

A few months after abandoning Zhenitba, the 29-year-old Mussorgsky was encouraged to write an opera on the story of Boris Godunov. This he did, assembling and shaping a text from Pushkin's play and Karamzin's history. Mussorgsky completed the large-scale score the following year while living with friends and working for the Forestry Department. However, the finished opera was rejected for theatrical performance in 1871, apparently because of its lack of any "prima donna" role. Mussorgsky set to work producing a revised and enlarged "second version". During the next year, which he spent sharing rooms with Rimsky-Korsakov, he made changes that went beyond those requested by the theatre. In this version the opera was accepted, probably in May 1872, and three excerpts were staged at the Mariinsky Theatre in 1873. It is often asserted that in 1872 the opera was rejected a second time, but no specific evidence for this exists.

By the time of the first production of Boris Godunov in February 1874, Mussorgsky had taken part in the ill-fated Mlada project (in the course of which he had made a choral version of his Night on Bald Mountain) and had begun Khovanshchina. Though far from being a critical success – and in spite of receiving only a dozen or so performances – the popular reaction in favour of Boris made this the peak of Mussorgsky's career.

=== Decline ===
From this peak, a pattern of decline became increasingly apparent. At this point, the Balakirev circle was disintegrating, something Mussorgsky was especially bitter about. He wrote to Vladimir Stasov, "[T]he Mighty Handful has degenerated into soulless traitors." In drifting away from his old friends, Mussorgsky had been seen to fall victim to "fits of madness" that could well have been alcoholism-related. His friend Viktor Hartmann had died, and Mussorgsky's relative and recent roommate Arseny Golenishchev-Kutuzov (who furnished the poems for the song-cycle Sunless and would go on to provide those for the Songs and Dances of Death) had moved away to get married. Mussorgsky engaged a new and prominent personal private physician about 1870, Dr. George Leon Carrick, sometime Secretary and later President of the St. Petersburg Physicians' Society and a cousin of Sir Harry Lauder.

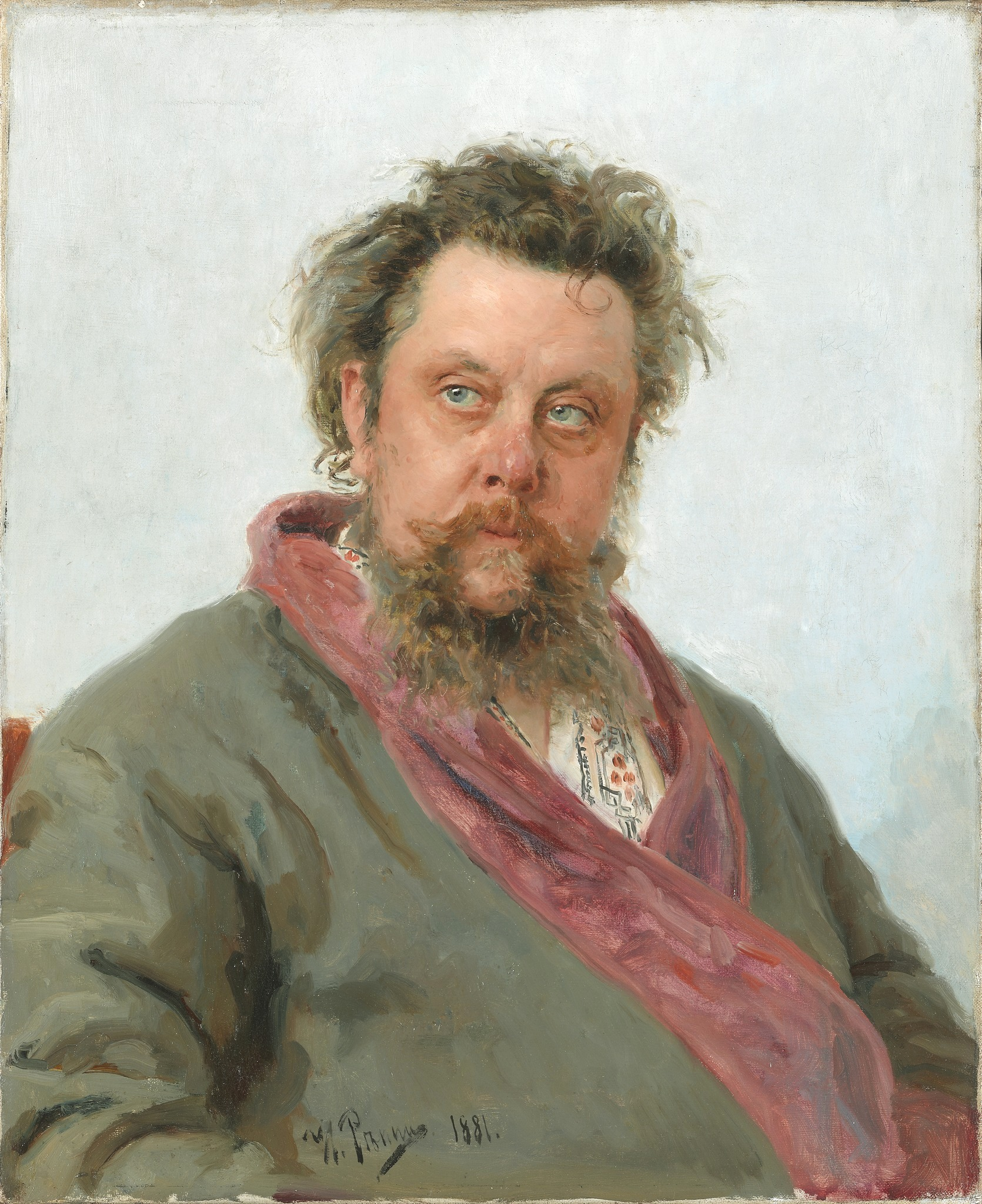
Ilya Repin's celebrated portrait of Mussorgsky, painted 2–5 March 1881, only a few days before the composer's death

While Mussorgsky suffered personally from alcoholism, it was also a behavior pattern considered typical for those of Mussorgsky's generation who wanted to oppose the establishment and protest through extreme forms of behavior. One contemporary noted, "an intense worship of Bacchus was considered to be almost obligatory for a writer of that period. It was a showing off, a 'pose,' for the best people of the [eighteen-]sixties." Another writes, "Talented people in Russia who love the simple folk cannot but drink." Mussorgsky spent day and night in a Saint Petersburg tavern of low repute, the Maly Yaroslavets, accompanied by other bohemian dropouts. He and his fellow drinkers idealized their alcoholism, perhaps seeing it as ethical and aesthetic opposition.

Pictures at an Exhibition
Part 1

Part 2

Part 3
Arrangement for two pianos

For a time, Mussorgsky was able to maintain his creative output: his compositions from 1874 include Sunless, the Khovanshchina Prelude, and the piano suite Pictures at an Exhibition (in memory of Hartmann); Mussorgsky also began working on another opera based on Gogol, The Fair at Sorochyntsi (for which he produced another choral version of Night on Bald Mountain).

In the years that followed, Mussorgsky's decline became increasingly steep. Although now part of a new circle of eminent personages that included singers, medical men, and actors, he was increasingly unable to resist drinking, and a succession of deaths among his closest associates caused him great pain. However, Mussorgsky's alcoholism would seem to be in check at times, and among the most powerful works composed during his last six years are the four Songs and Dances of Death. Mussorgsky's civil service career was made more precarious by his frequent "illnesses" and absences, and Mussorgsky was fortunate to obtain a transfer to a post (in the Office of Government Control), where his music-loving superior treated him with great leniency – even allowing Mussorgsky to spend three months touring 12 cities as a singer's accompanist in 1879.

However, the decline could not be halted. In 1880, Mussorgsky was finally dismissed from government service. Aware of his destitution, one group of friends organized a stipend designed to support the completion of Khovanshchina while another group organized a similar fund to pay him to complete The Fair at Sorochyntsi, but neither work was completed (although Khovanshchina, in piano score with only two numbers uncomposed, came close to being finished).

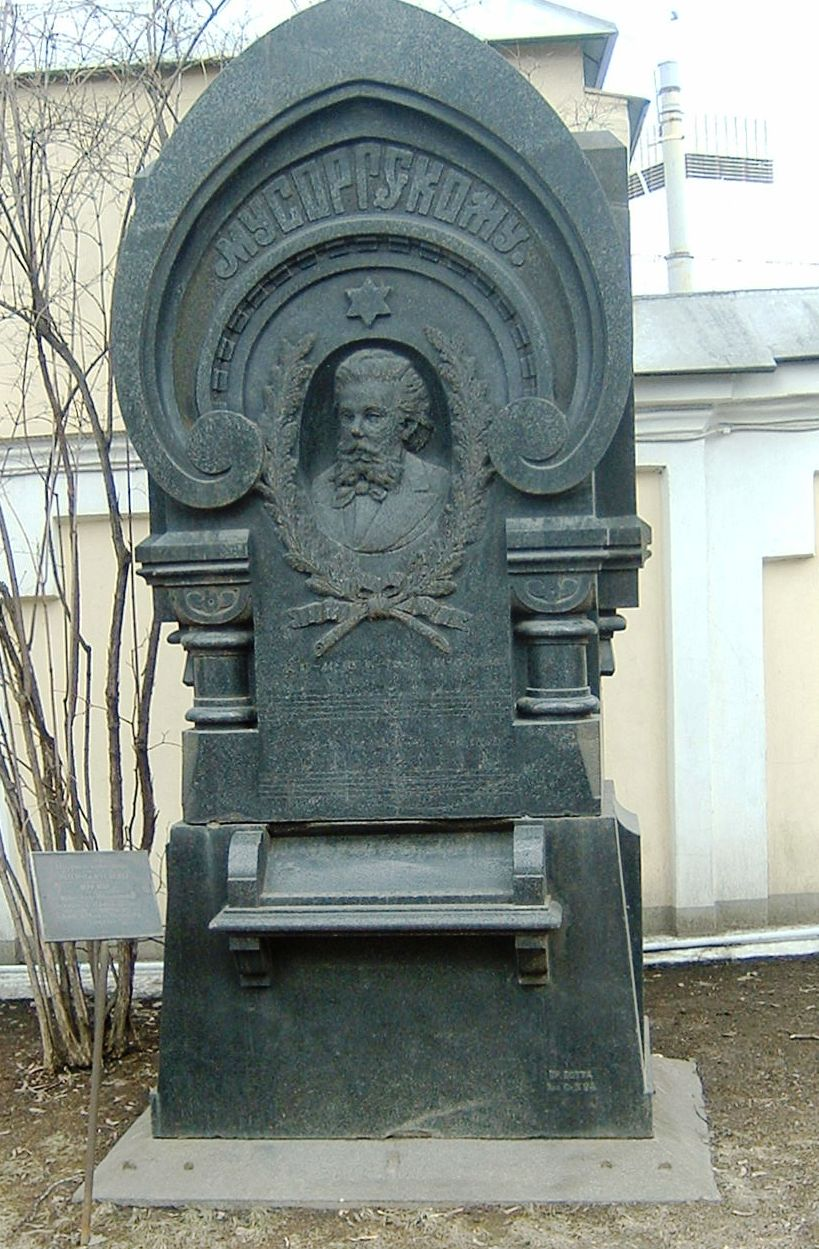
Mussorgsky's grave at Tikhvin Cemetery of the Alexander Nevsky Monastery in Saint Petersburg

In early 1881, a desperate Mussorgsky declared to a friend that there was "nothing left but begging" and suffered four seizures in rapid succession. Mussorgsky also suffered from delirium tremens during this period. Although he found a comfortable room in a good hospital—and for several weeks even appeared to be rallying—the situation was hopeless. In March 1881, Ilya Repin painted the famous, red-nosed portrait in what were to be the last days of the composer's life as Mussorgsky died a week after his 42nd birthday. Mussorgsky was interred at the Tikhvin Cemetery of the Alexander Nevsky Monastery in Saint Petersburg.

Mussorgsky, like others of "The Five", was perceived as an extremist by the emperor and much of his court. (Note: Under [the rule of] Alexander II the dominance of the Baltic Germans remained. Mikhail Katkov's employee, the Latvian Krisjanis Valdemar, in the article "Who rules Russia: the Russians themselves or the Germans?" collected the statistics: "Among ministers – 15% are Germans, among members of the State Council – 25%, among senators – 40%, generals – 50%, governors – 60%. And since the governors run Russia, this will be the answer to the question posed. Since all the Empresses [consorts] are German, it is natural that under their protection the Germans infiltrate into the higher administration. Katkov, having read the article with amazement, did not believe in the numbers. And he told the secretary to check it. The results of the check were even more striking: there were not 40 but 63% of German senators! But Katkov published Valdemar's article, replacing only the words about Empresses with 'high officials'".) This may have been the reason Tsar Alexander III personally crossed off Boris Godunov from the list of proposed pieces for the Imperial Opera in 1888.

== Works ==
"The Old Castle" from Pictures at an Exhibition
Performed on piano and saxophone by David Hernando

Mussorgsky's works, while strikingly novel, are stylistically Romantic and draw heavily on Russian musical themes. He has been the inspiration for many Russian composers, including most notably Dmitri Shostakovich (in his late symphonies) and Sergei Prokofiev (in his operas).

In 1868 or 1869, Mussorgsky composed the opera Boris Godunov, about the life of the Russian tsar, but it was rejected by the Mariinsky Opera. Mussorgsky thus edited the work, making a final version in 1874. The early version is considered darker and more concise than the later version, but also more crude. Nikolai Rimsky-Korsakov re-orchestrated the opera in 1896 and revised it in 1908. The opera has also been revised by other composers, notably Shostakovich, who made two versions, one for film and one for stage.

The opera Khovanshchina was unfinished and unperformed when Mussorgsky died, but it was completed by Rimsky-Korsakov and received its premiere in 1886 in Saint Petersburg. This opera was also revised by Shostakovich. The Fair at Sorochyntsi, another opera, was left incomplete at his death but a dance excerpt, the Gopak, is frequently performed.

Mussorgsky's most imaginative and frequently performed work is the cycle of piano pieces describing paintings in sound called Pictures at an Exhibition. This composition, best known through an orchestral arrangement by Maurice Ravel, was written in commemoration of his friend, the architect Viktor Hartmann.

Mussorgsky's single-movement orchestral work Night on Bald Mountain enjoyed broad popular recognition in the 1940s when it was featured, in tandem with Schubert's "Ave Maria", in the 1940 Walt Disney animated film Fantasia.

Among the composer's other works are a number of songs, including three song cycles: The Nursery (1872), Sunless (1874) and Songs and Dances of Death (1877); plus Mephistopheles' Song of the Flea and many others. Important early recordings of songs by Mussorgsky were made by tenor Vladimir Rosing in the 1920s and 1930s. Other recordings have been made by Boris Christoff between 1951 and 1957 and by Sergei Leiferkus in 1993.

== Reputation ==
Contemporary opinions of Mussorgsky as a composer and person varied from positive to ambiguous to negative. Mussorgsky's eventual supporters, Vladimir Stasov and Mily Balakirev, initially registered strongly negative impressions of the composer. Stasov wrote to Balakirev, in an 1863 letter, "I have no use for Mussorgsky. His views may tally with mine, but I have never heard him express an intelligent idea. All in him is flabby, dull. He is, it seems to me, a thorough idiot", and Balakirev agreed: "Yes, Mussorgsky is little short of an idiot."

Mixed impressions are recorded by Rimsky-Korsakov and Tchaikovsky, colleagues of Mussorgsky who, unlike him, made their living as composers. Both praised his talent while expressing disappointment with his technique. Rimsky-Korsakov wrote that Mussorgsky's scores included:

absurd, disconnected harmony, ugly part-writing, sometimes strikingly illogical modulation, sometimes a depressing lack of it, unsuccessful scoring of orchestral things... what was needed at the moment was an edition for performance, for practical artistic aims, for familiarization with his enormous talent, not for the study of his personality and artistic transgressions.

While preparing an edition of Sorochintsï Fair, Anatoly Lyadov remarked: "It is easy enough to correct Mussorgsky's irregularities. The only trouble is that when this is done, the character and originality of the music are done away with, and the composer's individuality vanishes."

Tchaikovsky, in a letter to his patroness Nadezhda von Meck, was also critical of Mussorgsky:

Mussorgsky you very rightly call a hopeless case. In talent he is perhaps superior to all the [other members of The Five], but his nature is narrow-minded, devoid of any urge towards self-perfection, blindly believing in the ridiculous theories of his circle and in his own genius. In addition, he has a certain base side to his nature which likes coarseness, uncouthness, roughness. He flaunts his illiteracy, takes pride in his ignorance, mucks along anyhow, blindly believing in the infallibility of his genius. Yet he has flashes of talent which are, moreover, not devoid of originality.

Western perceptions of Mussorgsky changed with the European premiere of Boris Godunov in 1908. Before the premiere, he was regarded as an eccentric in the West. Critic Edward Dannreuther, wrote, in the 1905 edition of The Oxford History of Music, "Mussorgsky, in his vocal efforts, appears wilfully eccentric. His style impresses the Western ear as barbarously ugly." However, after the premiere, views on Mussorgsky's music changed drastically. Gerald Abraham, a musicologist, and an authority on Mussorgsky: "As a musical translator of words and all that can be expressed in words, of psychological states, and even physical movement, he is unsurpassed; as an absolute musician he was hopelessly limited, with remarkably little ability to construct pure music or even a purely musical texture."

Beginning in 1918, Maria Olenina-d'Alheim performed Mussorgky's vocal works widely throughout France and England, introducing his music to large audiences of Western listeners.

== In popular culture ==
Mussorgsky's tone poem Night on Bald Mountain was used in the 1940 animated film Fantasia, accompanied by an animation of Chernobog summoning evil spirits on a mountain. It segues into Ave Maria by Franz Schubert.

The progressive rock band Emerson, Lake & Palmer performed and recorded an arrangement of Mussorgsky's Pictures at an Exhibition in 1971, featuring lyrics by Greg Lake, and released it as a live album of the same name.

The first 20 seconds of Michael Jackson's 1995 song "HIStory" relies on an orchestrated version of "The Bogatyr Gates (In the Capital in Kiev)" fragment of The Pictures at an Exhibition.

The 2020 film Eurovision Song Contest: The Story of Fire Saga starring Dan Stevens as Alexander Lemtov, a flamboyant singer representing Russia, had a non-typical Russian character development as an obvious cultural reference to Modest Mussorgsky, also known domestically for encouraging a female opera singer Daria Leonova to compose a classical song "Letter After the Ball".
