= List of Russian composers =

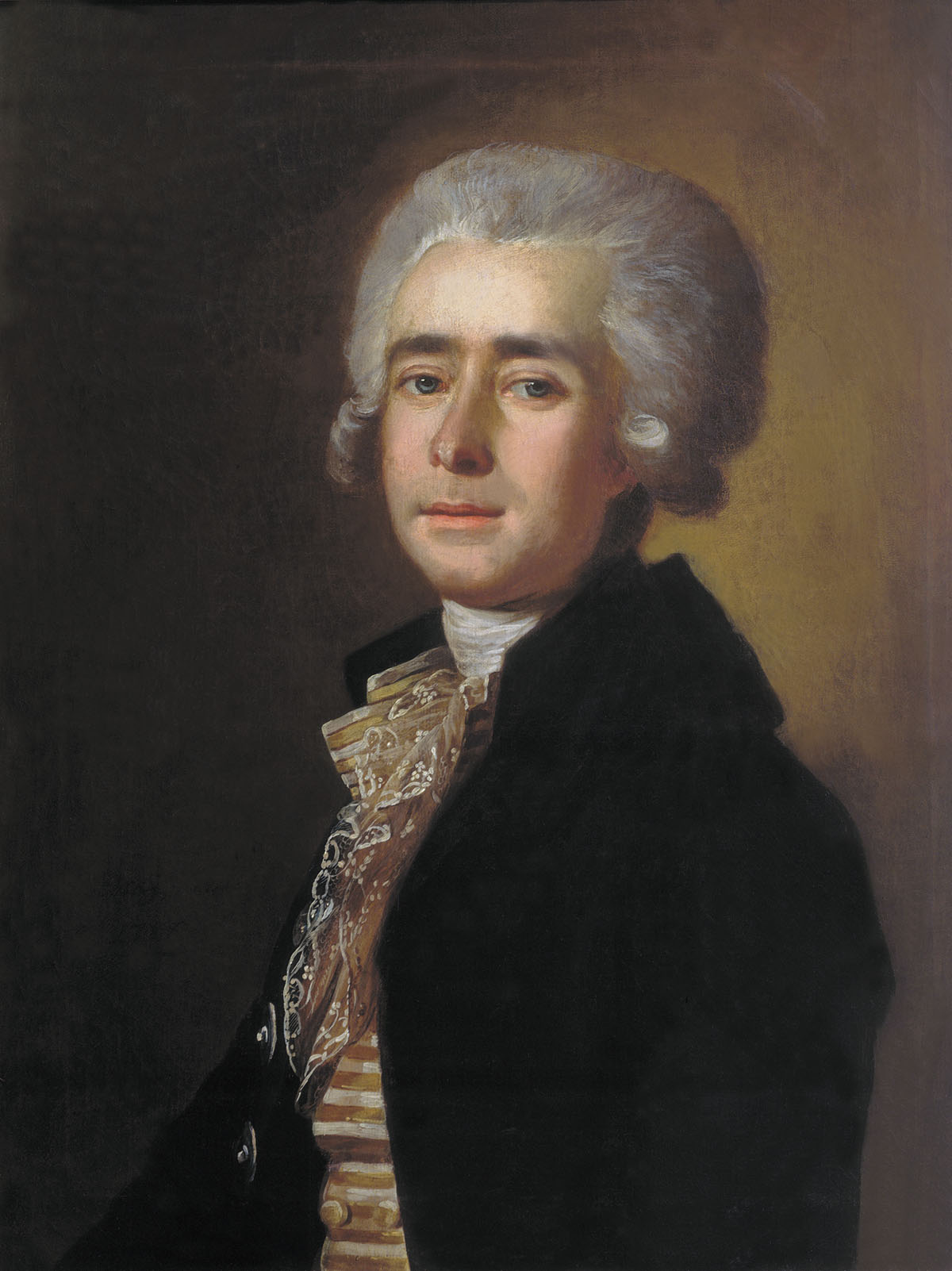
Bortniansky

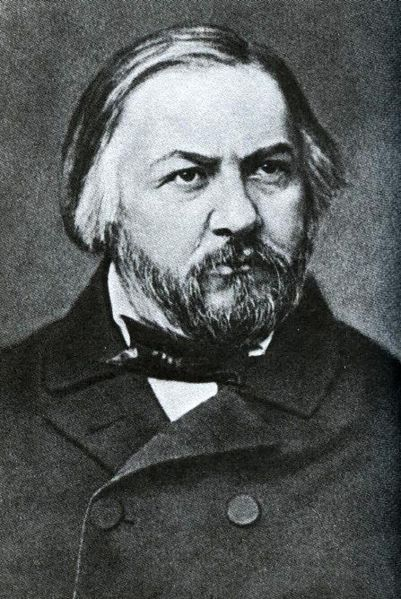
Glinka

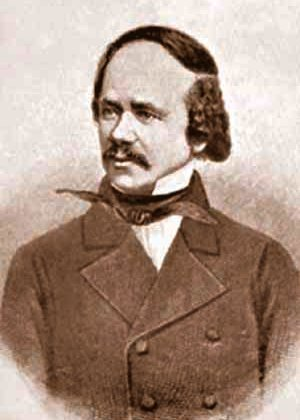
Dargomyzhsky

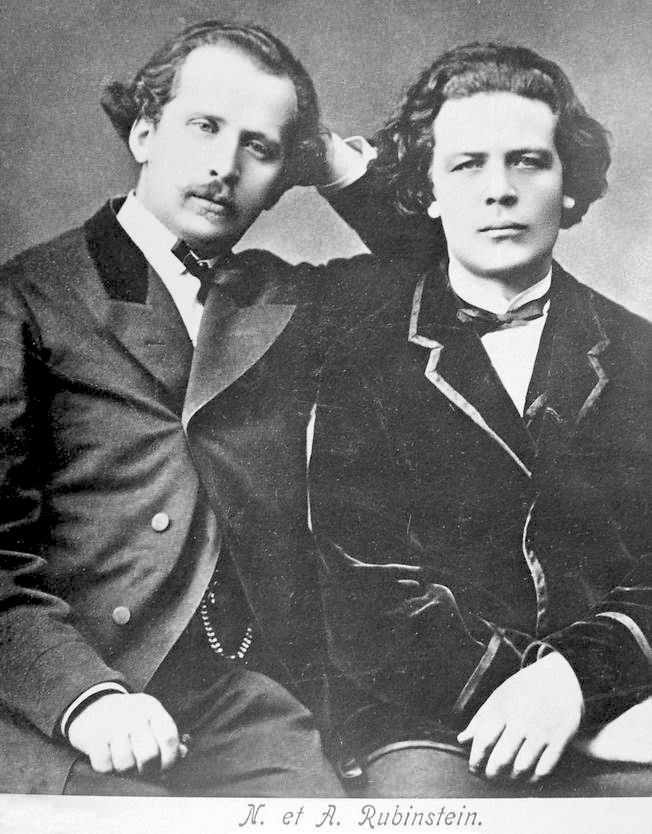
Nikolai and Anton Rubinstein

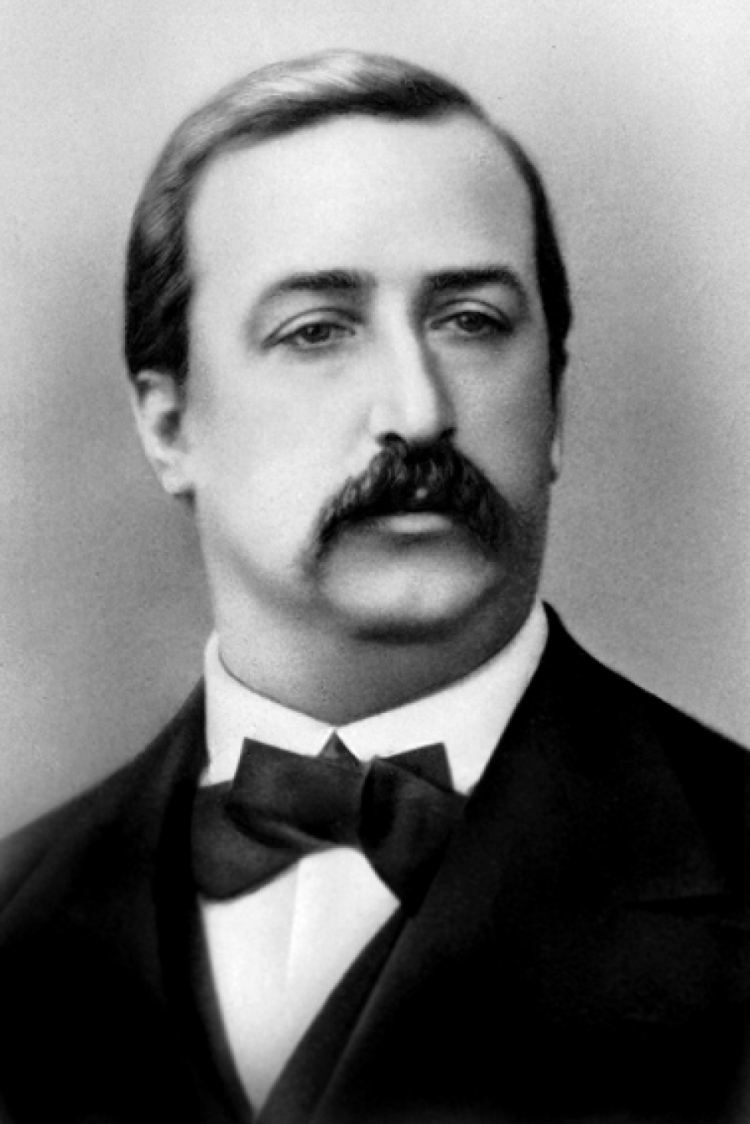
Borodin

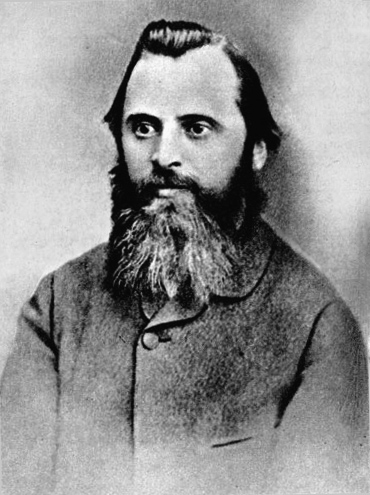
Balakirev

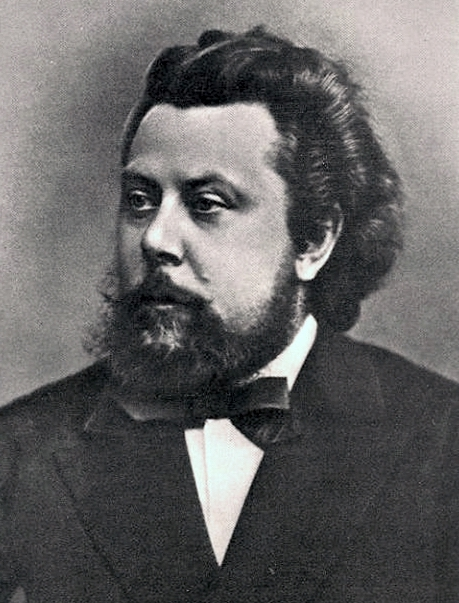
Mussorgsky

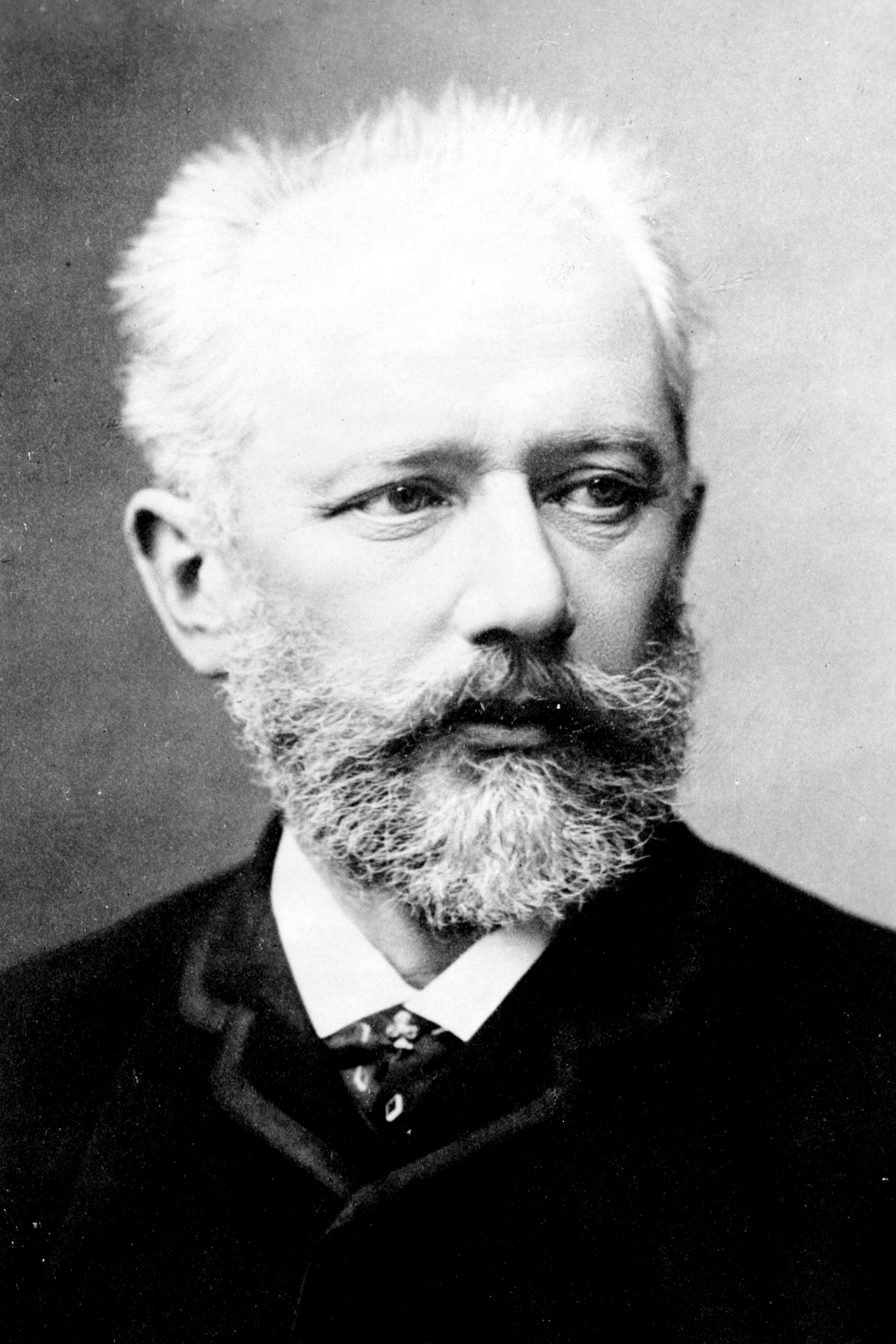
Tchaikovsky

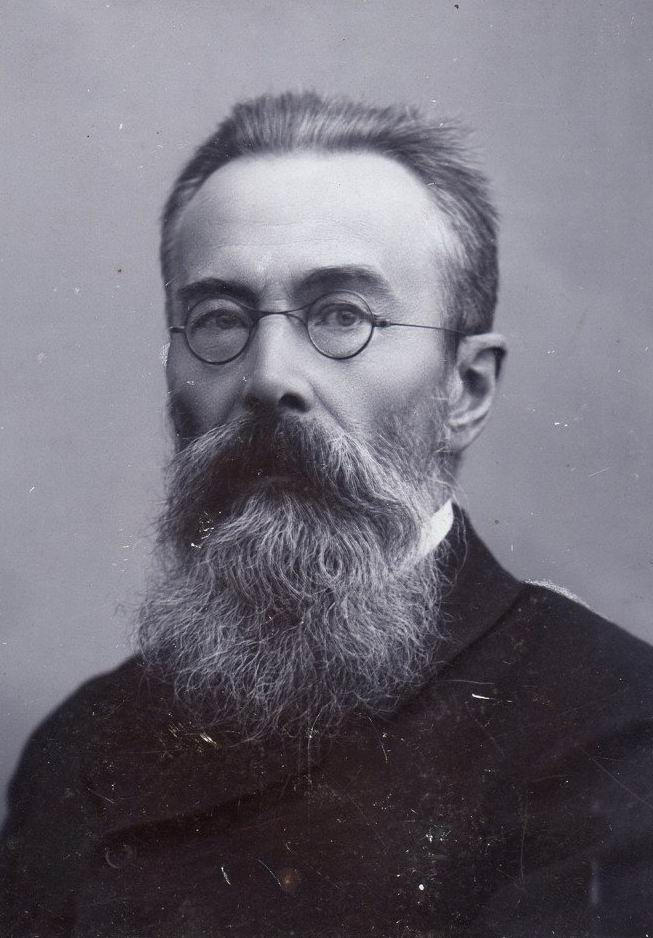
Rimsky-Korsakov

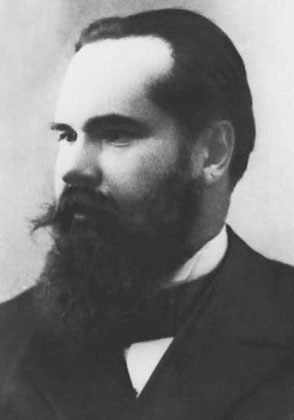
Taneyev

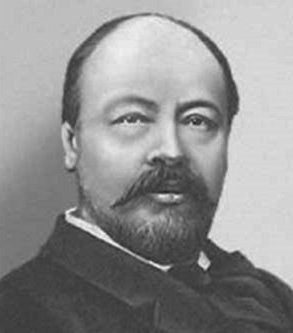
Lyadov

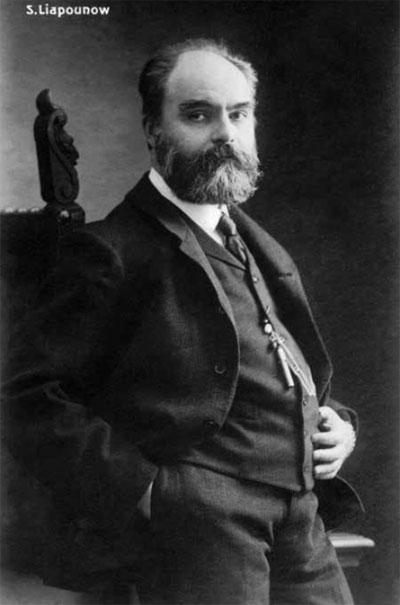
Lyapunov

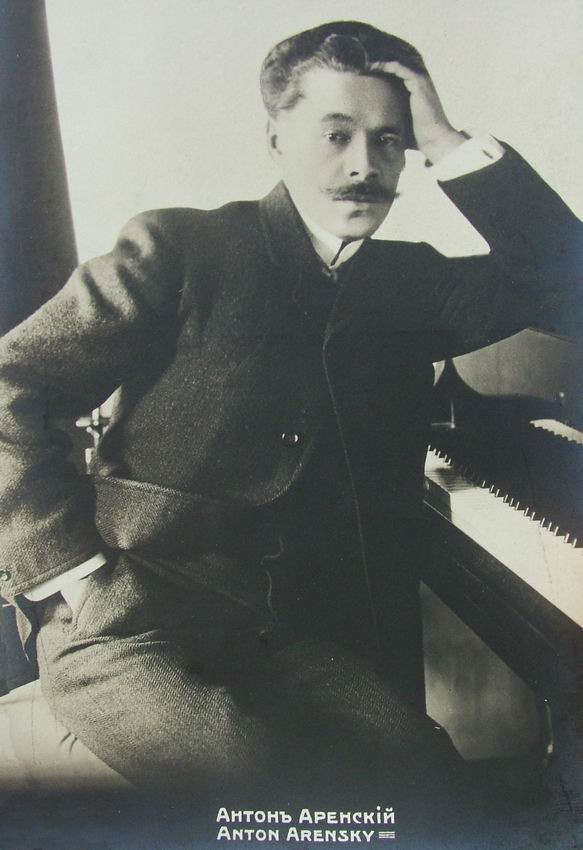
Arensky

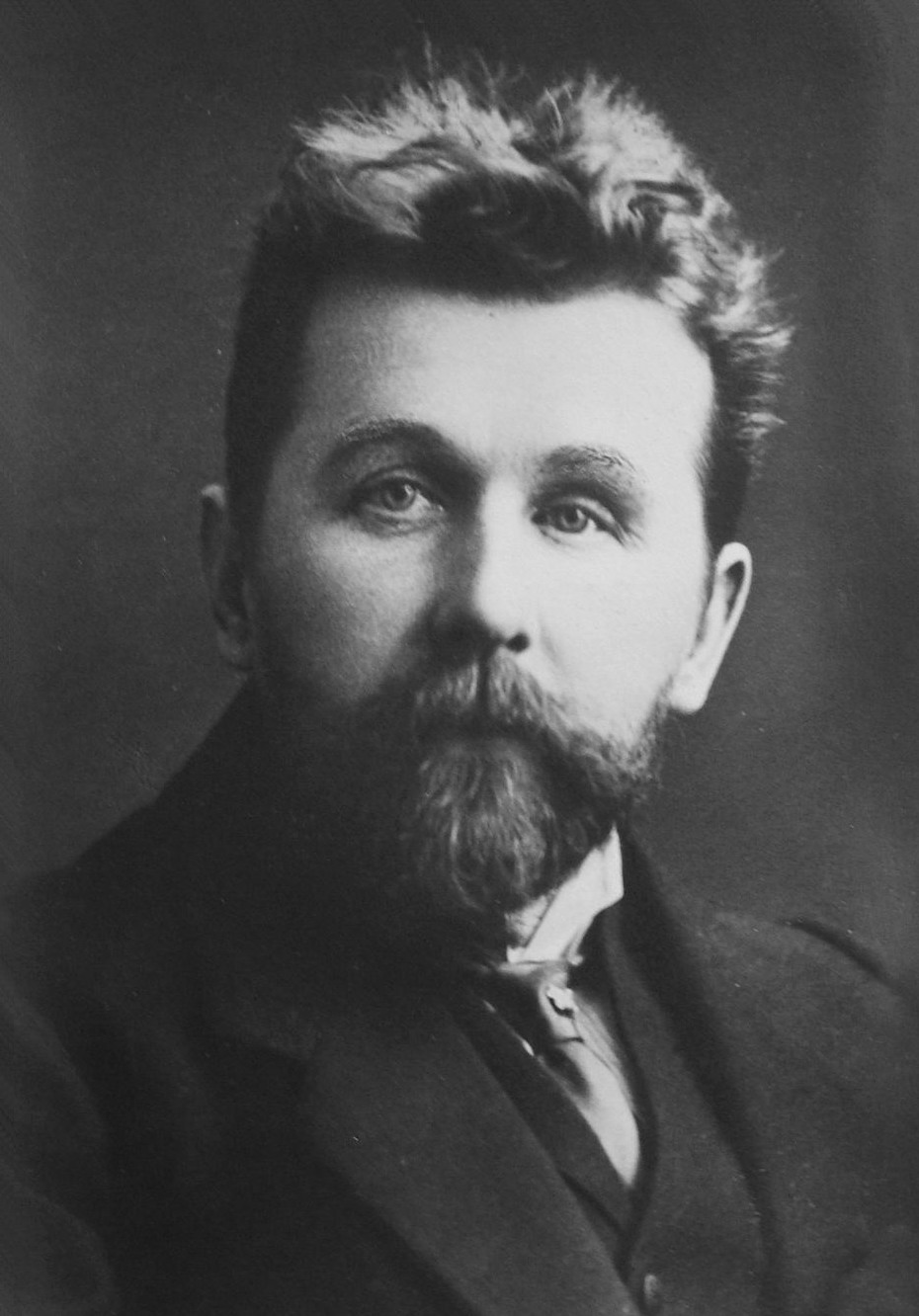
Gretchaninov

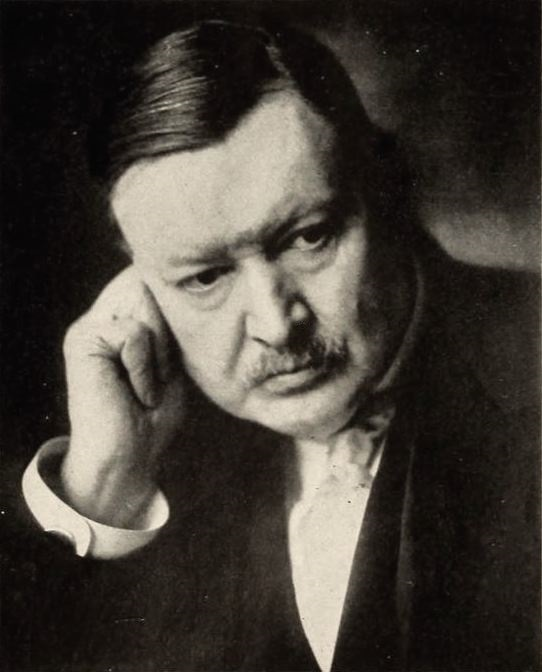
Glazunov

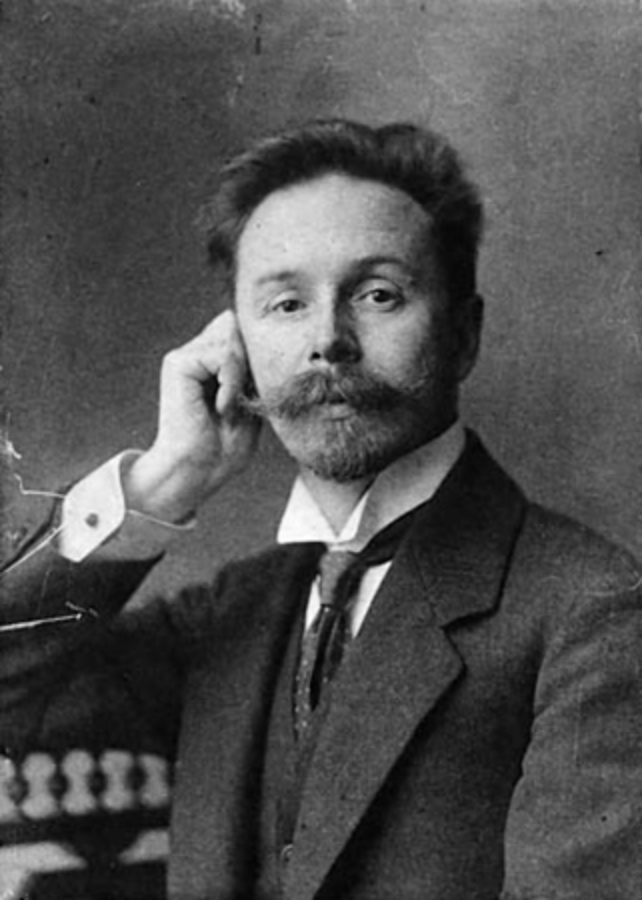
Scriabin

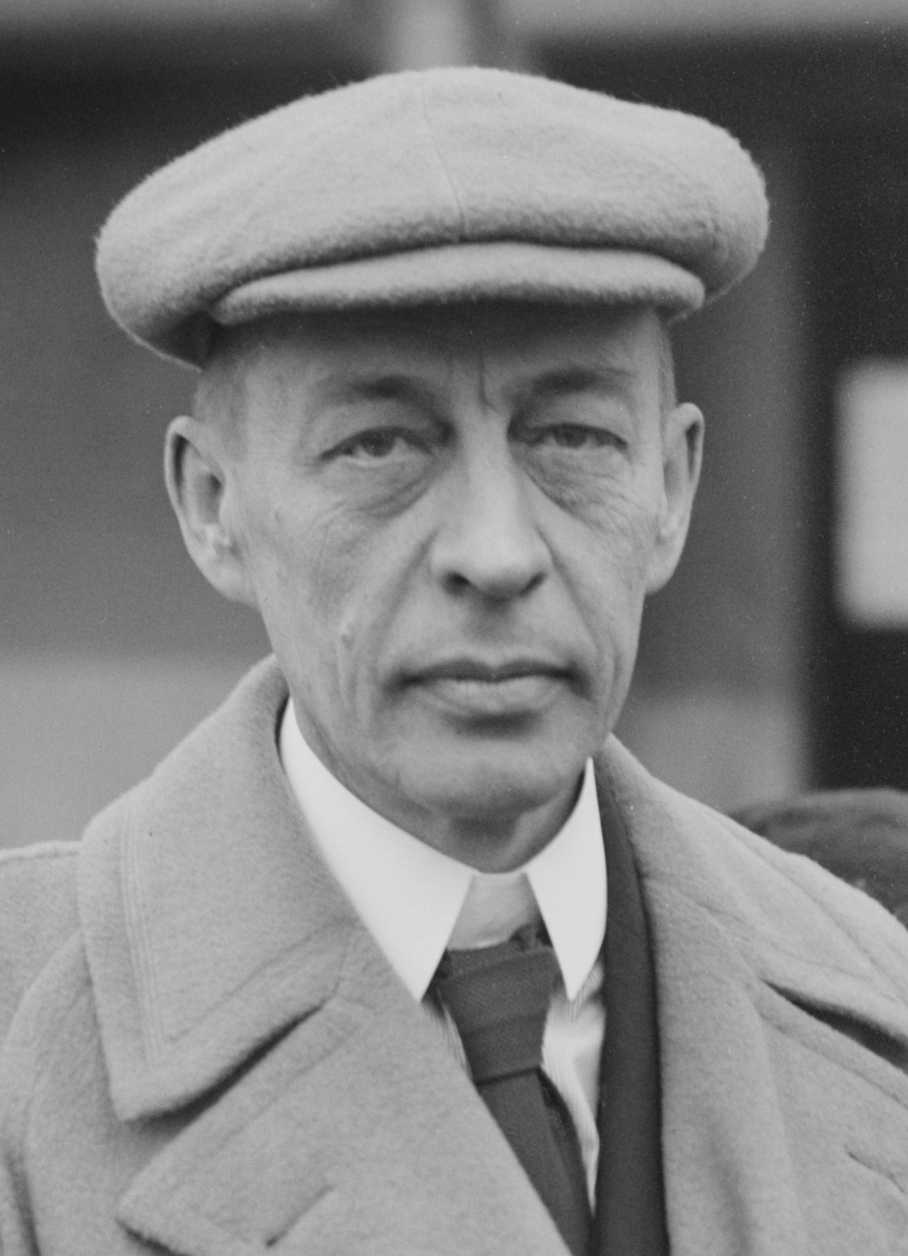
Rachmaninoff

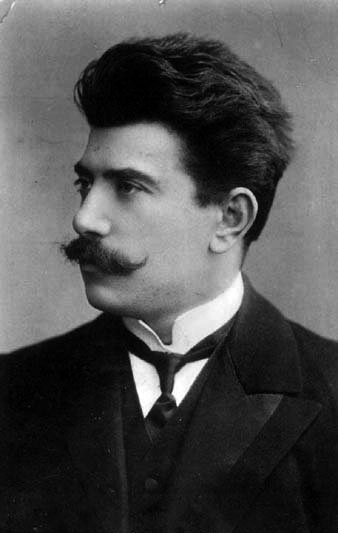
Glière

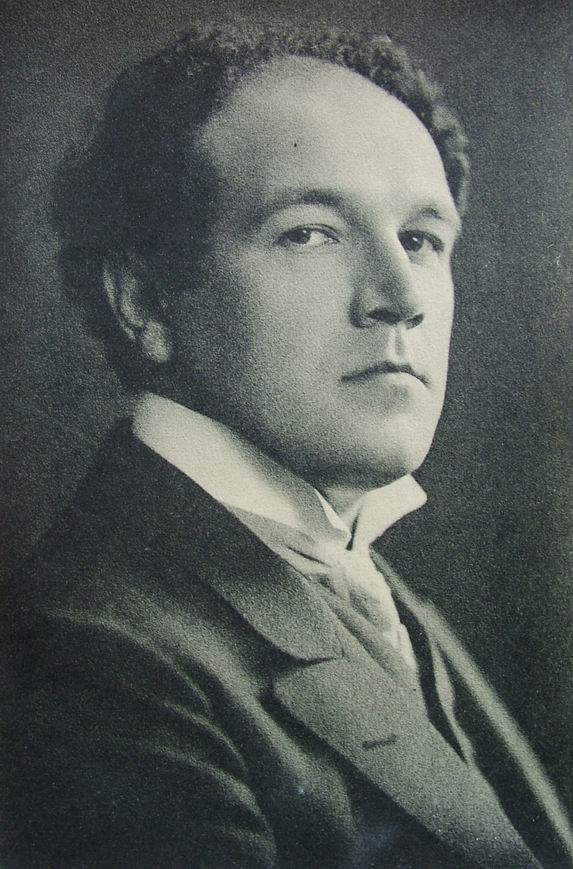
Medtner

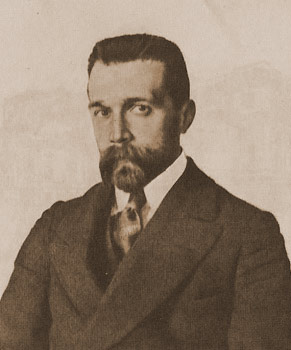
Myaskovsky

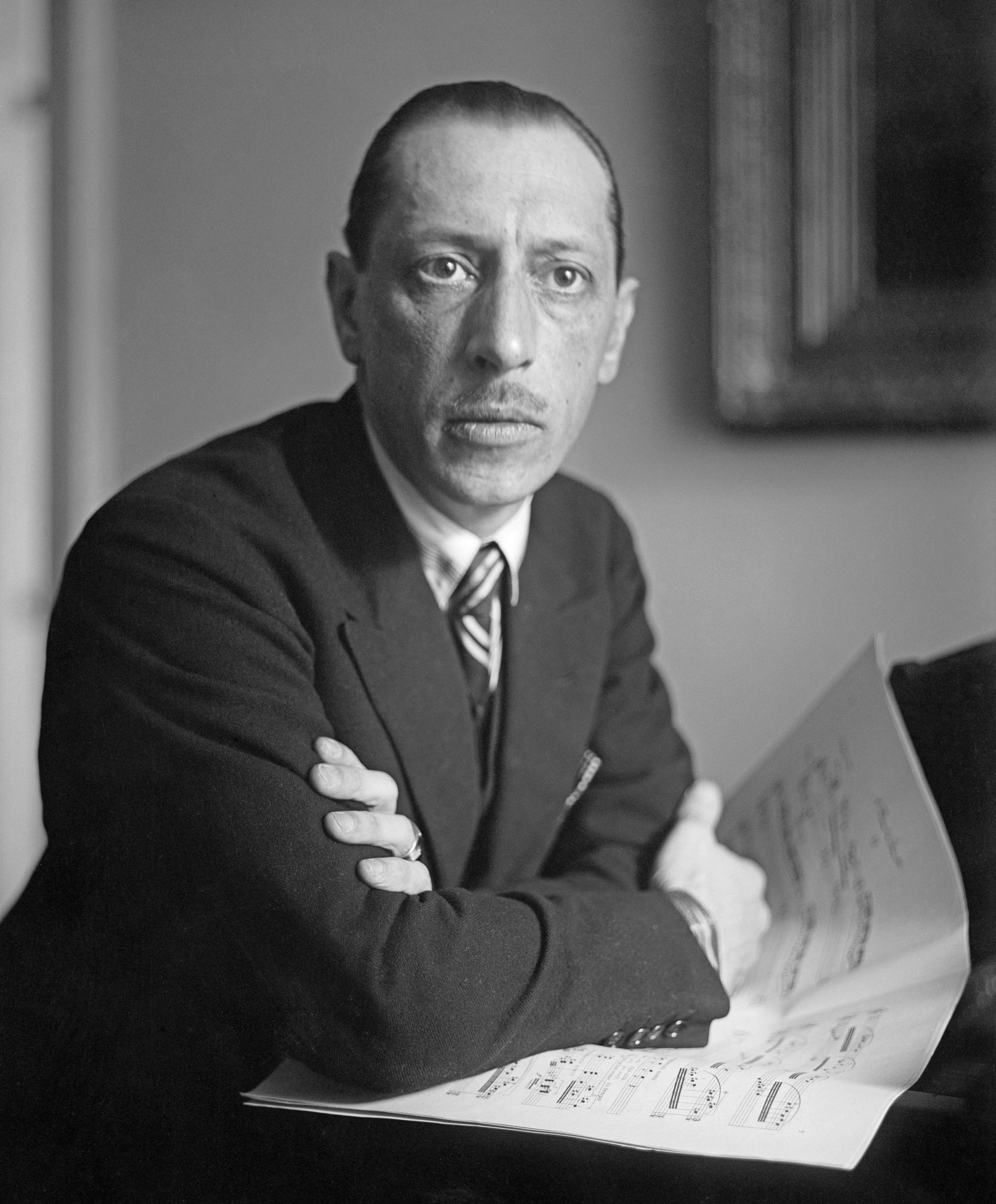
Stravinsky

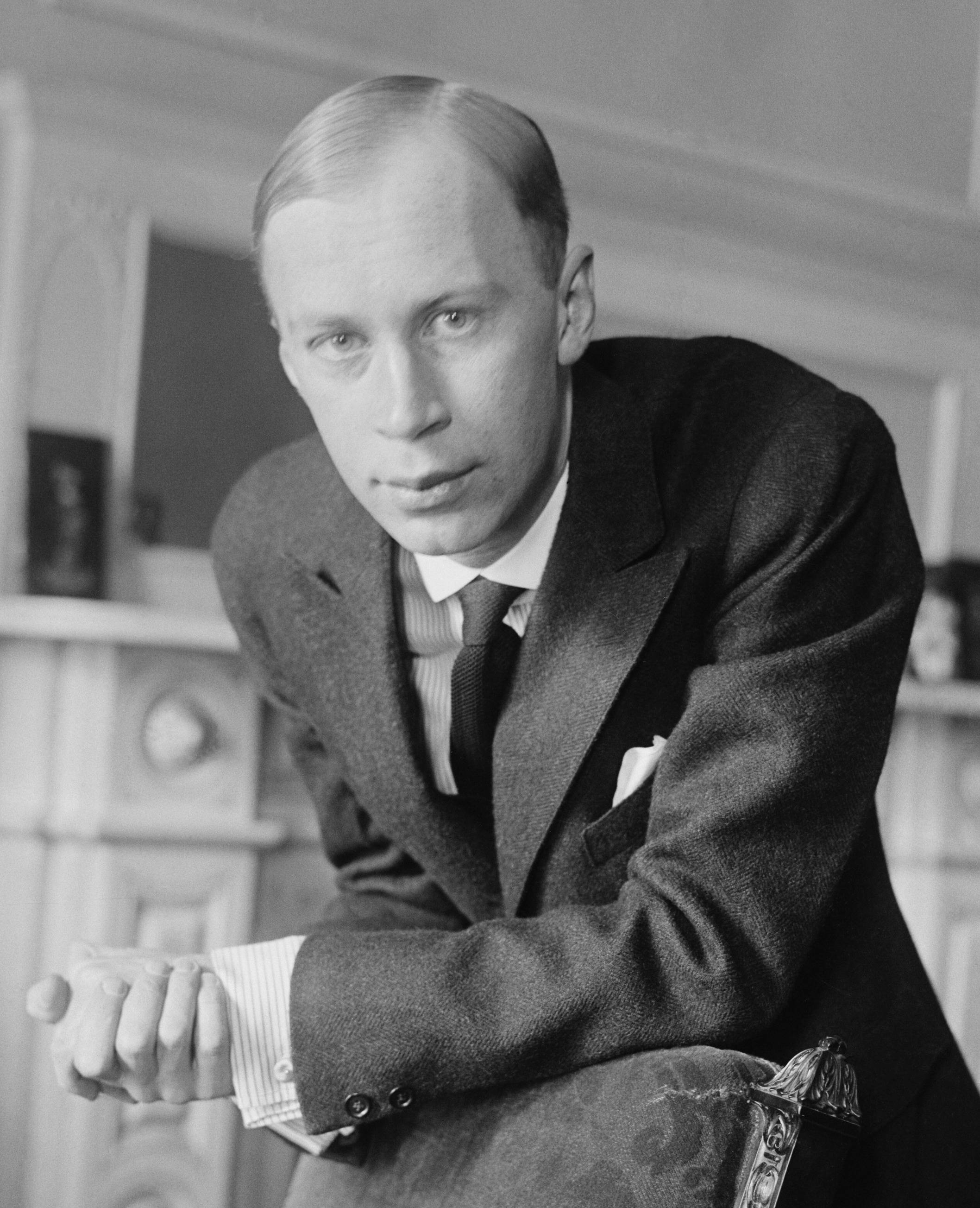
Prokofiev

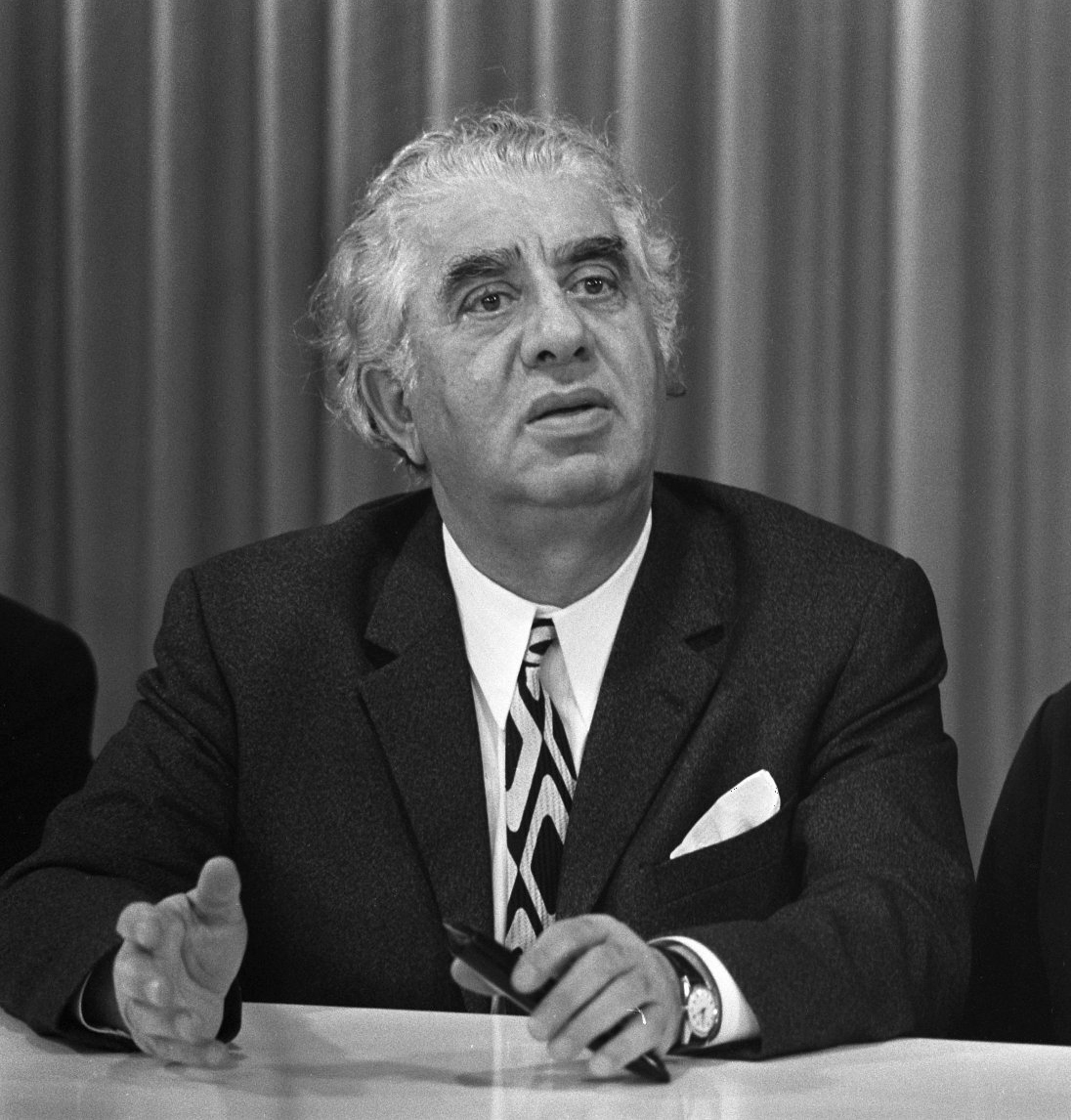
Khachaturian

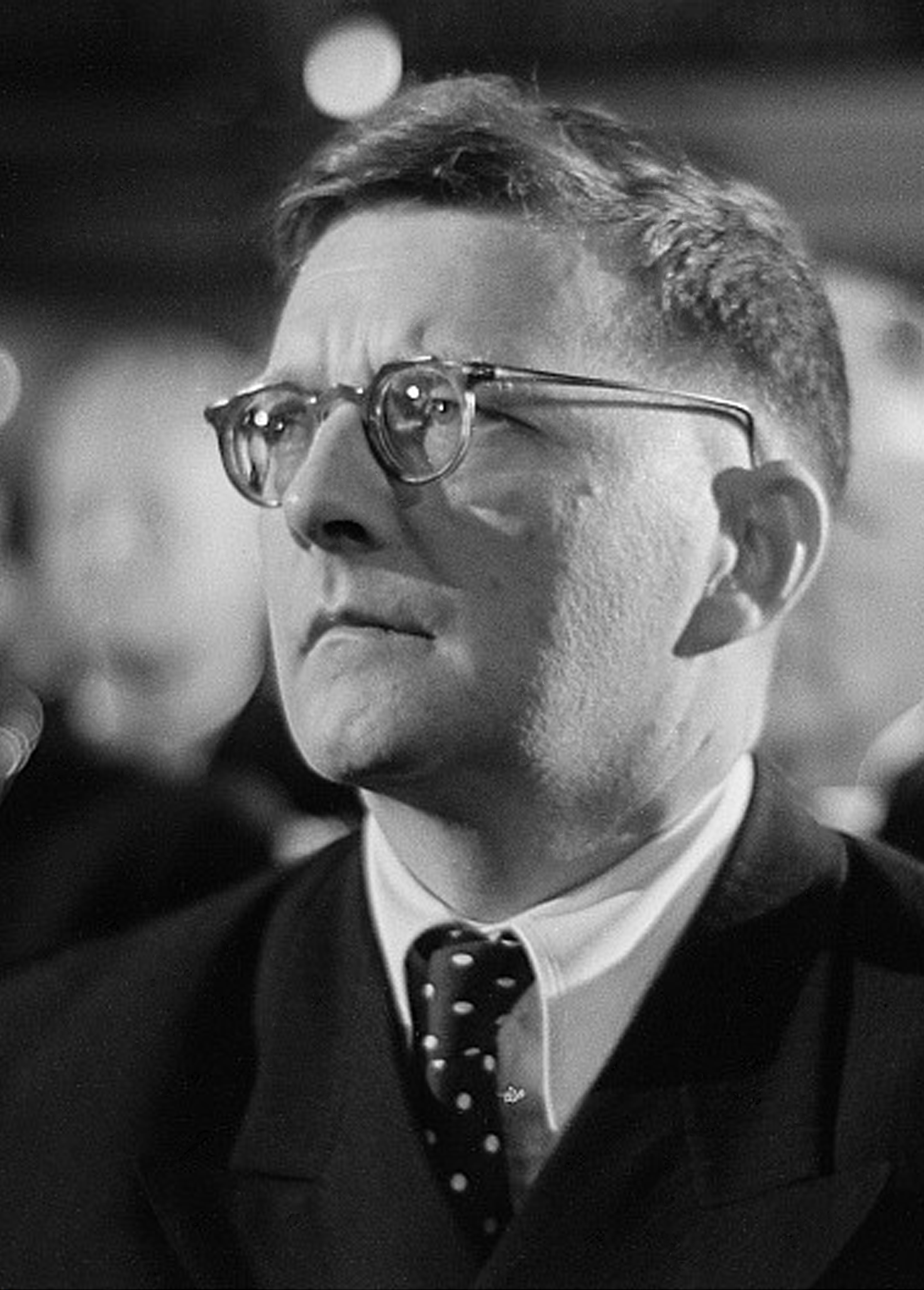
Shostakovich

Ustvolskaya

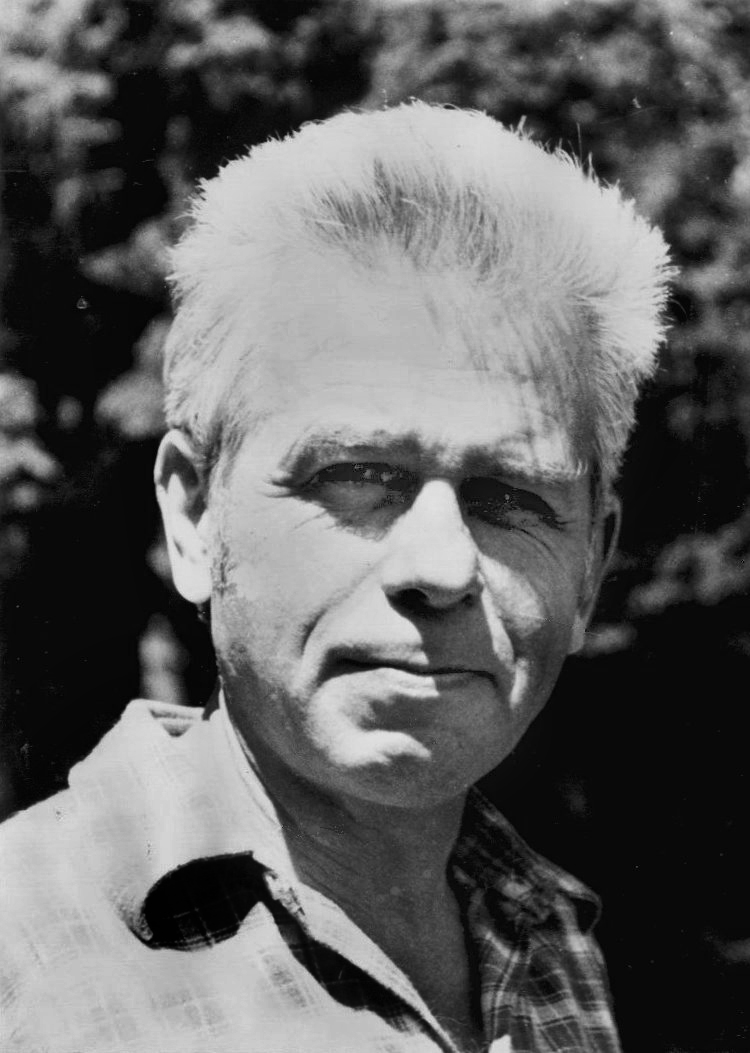
Denisov

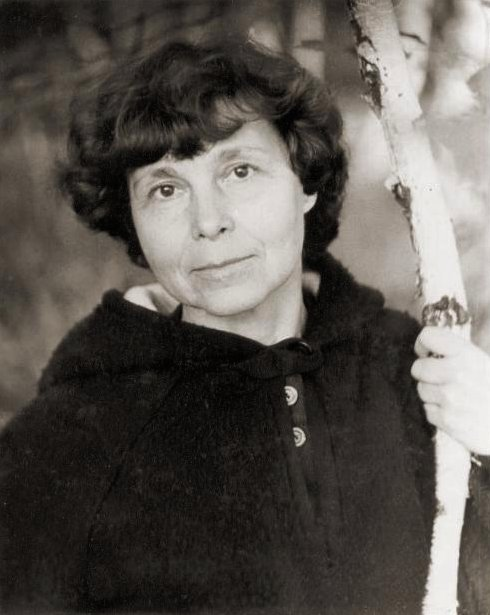
Gubaidulina

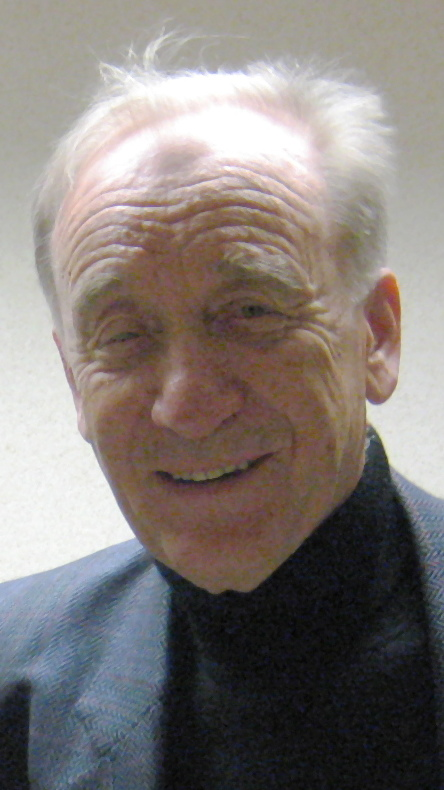
Shchedrin

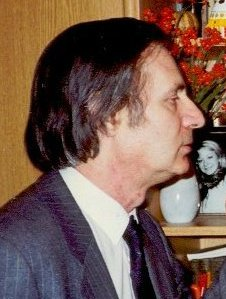
Schnittke

This is an alphabetical list of significant composers who were born or raised in Russia or the Russian Empire.

== A ==
- Els Aarne (1917–1995), born in present-day Estonia
- Evald Aav (1900–1939), born in present-day Estonia
- Juhan Aavik (1884–1982), born in present-day Estonia
- Arkady Abaza (1843–1915)
- Lev Abeliovich (1912–1985), born in present-day Lithuania
- Alexander Abramsky (1898–1985), born in present-day Ukraine
- Joseph Achron (1886–1943), born in present-day Lithuania
- Ella Adayevskaya (1846–1926)
- Nikolay Afanasyev (1820/1–1898)
- Vasily Agapkin (1884–1964)
- Alexander Alexandrov (1883–1946)
- Anatoly Alexandrov (1888–1982)
- Boris Alexandrov (1905–1994), son of Alexander
- Achilles Alferaki (1846–1919)
- Alexander Alyabyev (1787–1851)
- Anatoliy Andreyev (1941–2004)
- Iosif Andriasov (1933–2000)
- Boris Arapov (1905–1992)
- Anton Arensky (1861–1906)
- Sasha Argov (1914–1995)
- Mykola Arkas (1853–1909), born in present-day Ukraine
- Alexander Arkhangelsky (1846–1924)
- Eduard Artemyev (1937–2023)
- Nikolai Artsybushev (1858–1937)
- Vyacheslav Artyomov (born 1940)
- Boris Asafyev (1884–1949)
- Mukhtar Ashrafi (1912–1975), born in present-day Uzbekistan
- Sergei Aslamazyan (1897–1978), born in present-day Armenia
- Lera Auerbach (born 1973)
- Arseny Avraamov (1886–1944)
- Artemi Ayvazyan (1902–1975), born in present-day Armenia
- Mikhail Azanchevsky (1839–1881)

== B ==
- Vytautas Bacevičius (1905–1970), born in present-day Lithuania
- Afrasiyab Badalbeyli (1907–1976), born in present-day Azerbaijan
- Vladimir Bakaleinikov (1885–1953)
- Mily Balakirev (1837–1910)
- Sergey Balasanian (1902–1982), born in present-day Turkmenistan
- Sargis Barkhudaryan (1887–1973), born in present-day Georgia
- Veniamin Basner (1925–1996)
- Kārlis Baumanis (1835–1905), born in present-day Latvia
- Sonya Belousova (born 1990)
- Maxim Berezovsky (c. 1745 – 1777)
- Anastasiya Bespalova
- Timofiy Bilohradsky (c. 1710 – c. 1782)
- Matvey Blanter (1903–1990)
- Felix Blumenfeld (1863–1931)
- Leonid Bobylev (born 1949)
- Anatoly Bogatyrev (1913–2003), born in present-day Belarus
- Nikita Bogoslovsky (1913–2004)
- Alexander Borodin (1833–1887)
- Sergei Bortkiewicz (1877–1952), born in present-day Ukraine
- Dmitry Bortniansky (1751–1825), born in present-day Ukraine
- Rostislav Grigor'yevich Boyko (1931–2002)
- Yevgeny Brusilovsky (1905–1981)
- Vitaly Bujanovsky (1928–1993)
- Pavel Bulakhov (1824–1875), brother of Pyotr
- Pyotr Bulakhov (1822–1885), brother of Pavel
- Revol Bunin (1924–1976)
- Mutal Burhonov (1916–2002), born in present-day Uzbekistan

== C ==
- Georgy Catoire (1861–1926)
- Catterino Cavos (1775–1840)
- Nektarios Chargeishvili (1937–1971)
- Gayane Chebotaryan (1918–1998)
- Yekaterina Chemberdzhi (born 1960)
- Yury Chernavsky (1947–2025)
- Peter Chernobrivets (born 1965)
- Pavel Chesnokov (1877–1944)
- Tatyana Chudova (1944–2007)
- Alexander Chuhaldin (1892–1951)
- Näcip Cihanov (1911–1988)
- Jānis Cimze (1814–1881), born in present-day Latvia
- Mikalojus Konstantinas Čiurlionis (1875–1911), born in present-day Lithuania
- Georgi Conus (1862–1933), brother of Julius and Lev
- Julius Conus (1869–1942), brother of Georgi and Lev
- Lev Conus (1871–1944), brother of Georgi and Julius
- Serge Conus (1902–1988), son of Julius
- César Cui (1835–1918)

== D ==
- Alexandre Danilevski (born 1957)
- Kostiantyn Dankevych (1905–1984), born in present-day Ukraine
- Alexander Dargomyzhsky (1813–1869)
- Emīls Dārziņš (1875–1910), born in present-day Latvia
- Volfgangs Dārziņš (1906–1962), son of Emils, born in present-day Latvia
- Karl Davydov (1838–1889)
- Stepan Davydov (1777–1825), born in present-day Ukraine
- Stepan Degtyarev (1766–1813)
- Edison Denisov (1929–1996)
- Leonid Desyatnikov (born 1955)
- Nikolay Diletsky (c. 1630 – after 1680)
- Nikolai Dmitriev (1829–1893)
- Issay Dobrowen (1891–1953)
- Vyacheslav Dobrynin (b.1946)
- Victor Dolidze (1890–1933), born in present-day Georgia
- Viktor Drobysh (born 1966)
- Sandra Droucker (1875–1944)
- Fyodor Druzhinin (1932–2007)
- Alexandre Dubuque (1812–1897/8)
- Vernon Duke (1903–1969)
- Isaak Dunayevsky (1900–1955), born in present-day Ukraine
- Maksim Dunayevsky (b.1945)
- Balys Dvarionas (1904–1972), born in present-day Lithuania
- Ivan Dzerzhinsky (1909–1978)

== E ==
- Sophie-Carmen Eckhardt-Gramatté (1898–1974)
- Konstantin Eiges (1875–1950)
- Irina Elcheva (1926–2013)
- Boris Elkis (born 1973)
- Heino Eller (1887–1970), born in present-day Estonia
- Abdalla El-Masri (born 1962)
- Irina Emeliantseva (born 1973)
- Gustav Ernesaks (1908–1993), born in present-day Estonia
- Andrei Eshpai (1925–2015)
- Victor Ewald (1860–1935)

== F ==
- Maxim Fadeev (b.1968)
- Samuil Feinberg (1890–1962)
- Boris Feoktistov (born 1941)
- Vladimir Fere (1902–1971)
- Alissa Firsova (born 1986), daughter of Dmitri Smirnov and Elena Firsova
- Elena Firsova (born 1950)
- Boris Fitinhof-Schell (1829–1901)
- Veniamin Fleishman (1913–1941)
- Yevstigney Fomin (1761–1800)
- Isadore Freed (1900–1960)
- Grigory Frid (1915–2012)
- Alexander Fridlender (1906–1980)
- Arthur Friedheim (1859–1932)

== G ==
- Ossip Gabrilowitsch (1878–1936)
- Varvara Gaigerova (1903–1944)
- German Galynin (1922–1966)
- Lūcija Garūta (1902–1977), born in present-day Latvia
- Aleksandr Gauk (1893–1963)
- Valery Gavrilin (1939–1999)
- Misha Geller (1937–2007)
- Gennady Gladkov (1935–2023)
- Alexander Glazunov (1865–1936)
- Reinhold Glière (1875–1956), born in modern-day Ukraine
- Mikhail Glinka (1804–1857)
- Elena Gnesina (1874–1967), sister of Mikhail Gnessin
- Mikhail Gnessin (1883–1957), brother of Elena Gnesina
- Alexander Goedicke (1877–1957)
- Aleksandr Goldenweiser (1875–1961)
- Alexander Goldstein (born 1948)
- Nikolai Golovanov (1891–1951)
- Boris Goltz (1913–1942)
- Evgeny Golubev (1910–1988)
- Alexander Gradsky (1949–2021)
- Alexander Gretchaninov (1864–1956)
- Alexander Griboyedov (1795–1829)
- Juozas Gruodis (1884–1948), born in present-day Lithuania
- Sofia Gubaidulina (born 1931)
- Tofig Guliyev (1917–2000), born in present-day Azerbaijan
- Yevgeny Gunst (1877–1950)
- Aleksander Gurilyov (1803–1858), son of Lev
- Lev Gurilyov (1770–1844)

== H ==
- Niyazi Hajibeyov (1912–1984), son of Zulfugar
- Uzeyir Hajibeyov (1885–1948), born in present-day Azerbaijan
- Zulfugar Hajibeyov (1884–1950), born in present-day Azerbaijan
- Jovdat Hajiyev (1917–2002), born in present-day Azerbaijan
- Miina Härma (1864–1941), born in present-day Estonia
- Vladimir Horowitz (1903–1989)
- André Hossein (1905–1983), born in present-day Uzbekistan
- Semen Hulak-Artemovsky (1813–1873), born in present-day Ukraine

== I ==
- Alexander Ilyinsky (1859–1919)
- Mikhail Ippolitov-Ivanov (1859–1935)
- Timur Ismagilov (born 1982)
- Julius Isserlis (1888–1968)
- Ivan the Terrible (1530–1584)
- Mikhail Ivanov (1859–1920)
- Jānis Ivanovs (1906–1983), born in present-day Latvia
- Airat Ichmouratov (born 1973)

== J ==
- Paul Juon (1872–1940)
- Andrejs Jurjāns (1856–1922), born in present-day Latvia

== K ==
- Dmitry Kabalevsky (1904–1987)
- Murad Kajlayev (born 1931)
- Vasily Kalafati (1869–1942)
- Vasily Kalinnikov (1866–1901)
- Sandor Kalloś (born 1935)
- Alfrēds Kalniņš (1879–1951), born in present-day Latvia
- Jānis Kalniņš (1904–2000), son of Alfrēds, born in present-day Latvia
- Artur Kapp (1878–1952), born in present-day Estonia
- Eugen Kapp (1908–1996), son of Artur, born in present-day Estonia
- Villem Kapp (1913–1964), nephew of Artur, born in present-day Estonia
- Nikolai Kapustin (1937–2020)
- Nikolai Karetnikov (1930–1994)
- Daniil Kashin (1769–1841)
- Leokadiya Kashperova (1872–1940)
- Yuri Kasparov (born 1955)
- Alexander Kastalsky (1856–1926)
- Yakov Kazyansky (born 1948)
- Nikolay Kedrov Jr. (1905–1981), son of Nikolay Kedrov Sr.
- Nikolay Kedrov Sr. (1871–1940)
- Ivan Kerzelli (fl. 18th century)
- Aram Khachaturian (1903–1978), born in Georgia to an Armenian family
- Karen Khachaturian (1920–2011), nephew of Aram
- Ivan Khandoshkin (1747–1804)
- Yuri Khanon (born 1965)
- Tikhon Khrennikov (1913–2007)
- Igor Khudolei (1940–2001)
- Victor Kissine (born 1953)
- Dmitri Klebanov (1907–1987), born in present-day Ukraine
- Nikolai Klenovsky (1856–1915), born in present-day Ukraine
- Alexander Knaifel (1943–2024)
- Lev Knipper (1898–1974), born in present-day Georgia
- Vladimir Kobekin (born 1947)
- Mikhail Kollontay (born 1952)
- Lev Konov (born 1952)
- Yelena Konshina (born 1950)
- Alexander Kopylov (1854–1911)
- Grigoriy Korchmar (born 1947)
- Arseny Koreshchenko (1870–1921)
- Nikolai Korndorf (1947–2001)
- Viktor Kosenko (1896–1938)
- Alexander Koshetz (1875–1944), born in present-day Ukraine
- Nikita Koshkin (born 1956)
- Serge Koussevitzky (1874–1951)
- Osip Kozlovsky (1757–1831)
- Pylyp Kozytskiy (1893–1960), born in present-day Ukraine
- Cyrillus Kreek (1889–1962), born in present-day Estonia
- Alexander Krein (1883–1951)
- Vyacheslav Kruglik
- Yevgeny Krylatov (1934–2019)
- Andrei Krylov (born 1961)

== L ==
- Ivan Larionov (1830–1889)
- Ivan Laskovsky (1799–1855)
- Boris Ledkovsky (1894–1975)
- Albert Leman (1915–1998)
- Artur Lemba (1885–1963), born in present-day Estonia
- Mykola Leontovych (1877–1921), born in present-day Ukraine
- Zara Levina (1906–1976)
- Alexander Levine (born 1955)
- Yuri Levitin (1912–1993)
- Mischa Levitzki (1898–1941)
- Ekaterina Likoshin (fl. 1800–1810)
- Vasily Lobanov (born 1947)
- Aleksandr Lokshin (1920–1987)
- Arthur Lourié (1892–1966)
- Mihkel Lüdig (1880–1958), born in present-day Estonia
- Oleg Lundstrem (1916–2005)
- Alexei Lvov (1799–1870)
- Anatoly Lyadov (1855–1914)
- Lyudmila Lyadova (1925–2021)
- Sergei Lyapunov (1859–1924)
- Boris Lyatoshinsky (1895–1968), born in present-day Ukraine
- Mykola Lysenko (1842–1912), born in present-day Ukraine

== M ==
- Muslim Magomayev (1885–1937), born in present-day Azerbaijan
- Heorhiy Maiboroda (1913–1992), born in present-day Ukraine
- Katerina Maier (fl. c. 1800)
- Nina Makarova (1908–1976)
- Leonid Malashkin (1842–1902)
- Dmitry Malikov (born 1970)
- Witold Maliszewski (1873–1939), born in present-day Ukraine
- Igor Markevitch (1912–1983), born in present-day Ukraine
- Mykola Markevych (1804–1860), born in present-day Ukraine
- Vladimir Martynov (born 1946)
- Vladimir Matetsky (born 1952)
- Mikhail Matinsky (1750 – c. 1820)
- Igor Matvienko (b.1960)
- Mikhail Matyushin (1861–1934)
- Samuel Maykapar (1867–1938)
- Jānis Mediņš (1890–1966), born in present-day Latvia
- Nikolai Medtner (1880–1951)
- Yuliy Meitus (1903–1997), born in present-day Ukraine
- Romanos Melikian (1883–1935), born in present-day Armenia
- Emilis Melngailis (1874–1954), born in present-day Latvia
- Ion Melnik (1935–2018)
- Zhanneta Metallidi (1934–2019)
- Moses Milner (1886–1953)
- Emil Młynarski (1870–1835), born in present-day Lithuania
- Boris Mokrousov (1909–1968)
- Kirill Molchanov (1922–1982)
- Fred Momotenko (born 1970)
- Alexander Mordukhovich (born 1946)
- Alexander Mosolov (1900–1973)
- Veli Mukhatov (1916–2005), born in present-day Turkmenistan
- Vano Muradeli (1908–1970), born in present-day Georgia
- Modest Mussorgsky (1839–1881)
- Mansur Muzafarov (1902–1966)
- Nikolai Myaskovsky (1881–1950)

== N ==
- Nicolas Nabokov (1903–1978)
- Vyacheslav Nagovitsin (born 1939)
- Aleksey Nasedkin (1942–2014)
- Lev Naumov (1925–2005)
- Svetlana Nesterova
- Igor Nikolayev (b.1960)
- Leonid Nikolayev (1868–1942)
- Tatiana Nikolayeva (1924–1993)
- Petro Nishchynsky (1832–1896), born in present-day Ukraine
- Mikhaïl Nosyrev (1924–1981)
- Anatoly Novikov (1896–1984)
- David Nowakowsky (1848–1921)

== O ==
- Nikolai Obukhov (1892–1954)
- Eduard Oja (1909–1950), born in present-day Estonia
- German Okunev (1931–1973)
- Leo Ornstein (1895–2002), born in present-day Ukraine
- Vyacheslav Ovchinnikov (1936–2019)
- Dangatar Ovezov (1911–1966), born in present-day Turkmenistan
- Valdemārs Ozoliņš (1896–1973), born in present-day Latvia

== P ==
- Aleksandra Pakhmutova (born 1929)
- Zacharia Paliashvili (1871–1933), born in present-day Georgia
- Boris Parsadanian (1925–1997)
- Vasily Pashkevich (c. 1742 – 1797)
- Boris Pasternak (1890–1960)
- Alla Pavlova (born 1952)
- Andrey Petrov (1930–2006)
- Ernest Pingoud (1887–1942)
- Mikhail Pletnev (born 1957)
- Daniil Pokrass (1905–1954), brother of Samuel and Dmitry
- Dmitry Pokrass (1899–1978), brother of Samuel and Daniil
- Samuel Pokrass (1894–1939), brother of Dmitry and Daniil
- Gavriil Popov (1904–1972)
- Sergei Prokofiev (1891–1953), born in present-day Ukraine
- Sergei Protopopov (1893–1954)

== Q ==
- Abai Qunanbaiuly (1845–1904), born in present-day Kazakhstan

== R ==
- Sergei Rachmaninoff (1873–1943)
- Alexander Radvilovich (born 1955)
- Nikolai Rakov (1908–1990)
- Eda Rapoport (1890–1968), born in present-day Latvia
- Alexander Raskatov (born 1953)
- Vladimir Rebikov (1866–1920)
- Levko Revutsky (1889–1977), born in present-day Ukraine
- Nadezhda Rimskaya-Korsakova (1848–1919)
- Nikolai Rimsky-Korsakov (1844–1908)
- Alexander Rosenblatt (born 1956)
- Nikolai Roslavets (1881–1944)
- Baruch Rosowsky (1841–1919), born in present-day Latvia
- Solomon Rosowsky (1878–1962), son of Baruch, born in present-day Latvia
- Olesya Rostovskaya (born 1975)
- Anton Rubinstein (1829–1894), brother of Nikolai
- Nikolai Rubinstein (1835–1881), brother of Anton
- Joseph Rumshinsky (1881–1956), born in present-day Lithuania
- Said Rustamov (1907–1983), born in present-day Armenia
- Alexey Rybnikov (b.1945)

== S ==
- Mart Saar (1882–1963), born in present-day Estonia
- Leonid Sabaneyev (1881–1968)
- Martha von Sabinin (1831–1892)
- Tolibjon Sadikov (1907–1957), born in present-day Uzbekistan
- Vasily Safonov (1852–1918)
- Niescier Sakałoŭski (1902–1950), born in present-day Belarus
- Vadim Salmanov (1912–1978)
- Lazare Saminsky (1882–1959)
- Huseyngulu Sarabski (1879–1945), born in present-day Azerbaijan
- Joseph Schillinger (1895–1943)
- Alfred Schnittke (1934–1998)
- Eduard Schütt (1856–1933)
- Alexander Scriabin (1872–1915)
- Julian Scriabin (1908–1919), son of Alexander
- Tatyana Sergeyeva (born 1951)
- Alexander Serov (1820–1871)
- Valentina Serova (1846–1924)
- Vladimir Shainsky (1925–2017)
- Masguda Shamsutdinova (born 1955)
- Yuri Shaporin (1887–1966), born in present-day Ukraine
- Adrian Shaposhnikov (1888–1967)
- Rodion Shchedrin (1932–2025)
- Nikolai Shcherbachov (1853–1922)
- Vladimir Shcherbachov (1889–1952)
- Vissarion Shebalin (1902–1963)
- Boris Sheremetev (1822–1906)
- Baluan Sholak (1864–1919), born in present-day Kazakhstan
- Dmitri Shostakovich (1906–1975)
- Andriy Shtoharenko (1902–1992), born in present-day Ukraine.
- Jean Sibelius (1865–1957), born in present-day Finland.
- Nikolaï Sidelnikov (1930–1992)
- Alexander Siloti (1863–1945)
- Juhan Simm (1885–1959), born in present-day Estonia
- Yekaterina Sinyavina (died 1784)
- Gregory Skovoroda (1722–1794)
- Ādolfs Skulte (1909–2000), born in present-day Latvia
- Nicolas Slonimsky (1894–1995)
- Sergei Slonimsky (1932–2020), nephew of Nicolas
- Dmitri Smirnov (1948–2020)
- Vladimir Sokalsky (1863–1919)
- Ivan Sokolov (born 1960)
- Nikolay Sokolov (1859–1922)
- Mikhail Sokolovsky (1756 – after 1795)
- Nicolai Soloviev (1846–1916)
- Vasily Solovyov-Sedoi (1907–1979)
- Antonio Spadavecchia (1907–1977)
- Alexander Spendiaryan (1871–1928)
- Alexei Stanchinsky (1888–1914)
- Maximilian Steinberg (1883–1946), born in present-day Lithuania
- Yakiv Stepovy (1883–1921), born in present-day Ukraine
- Kyrylo Stetsenko (1882–1922), born in present-day Ukraine
- Igor Stravinsky (1882–1971)
- Peeter Süda (1883–1920), born in present-day Estonia
- Grikor Suni (1876–1939), born in present-day Armenia
- Viktor Suslin (1942–2012)
- Yevgeny Svetlanov (1928–2002)
- Georgy Sviridov (1915–1998)
- Alfred Swan (1890–1970)

== T ==
- Alexander Taneyev (1850–1918)
- Sergei Taneyev (1856–1915)
- Vladimir Tarnopolsky (born 1955)
- Boris Tchaikovsky (1925–1996)
- Pyotr Ilyich Tchaikovsky (1840–1893)
- Alexander Tcherepnin (1899–1977), son of Nikolai
- Nikolai Tcherepnin (1873–1945)
- Grigory Teplov (1717–1779)
- Armen Tigranian (1879–1950), born in present-day Armenia
- Nikoghayos Tigranian (1856–1951), born in present-day Armenia
- Dimitri Tiomkin (1894–1979), born in present-day Ukraine
- Boris Tishchenko (1939–2010)
- Alexey Titov (1769–1827)
- Nikolai Titov (1800–1875), son of Alexey
- Vasily Titov (c. 1650 – c. 1715)
- Rudolf Tobias (1873–1918), born in present-day Estonia
- Eduard Tubin (1905–1982), born in present-day Estonia
- Serafim Tulikov (1914–2004)

== U ==
- Vladimir Ussachevsky (1911–1990)
- Galina Ustvolskaya (1919–2006)

== V ==
- Raimond Valgre (1913–1949), born in present-day Estonia
- Alexander Varlamov (1801–1848)
- Sergei Vasilenko (1872–1956)
- Vladimir Vavilov (1925–1973)
- Artemy Vedel (c. 1767 – 1808), born in present-day Ukraine
- Alexander Veprik (1889–1958)
- Alexey Verstovsky (1799–1862)
- Yuliya Veysberg (1880–1942)
- Mikhail Vielgorsky (1788–1856)
- Ernests Vīgners (1850–1933), born in present-day Latvia
- Tony Vilgotsky (born 1980)
- Mykola Vilinsky (1888–1956), born in present-day Ukraine
- Jāzeps Vītols (1863–1948), born in present-day Latvia
- Vladimir Vlasov (1902/3–1986)
- Andrei Volkonsky (1933–2008)
- Alexander Vustin (1943–2020)
- Mikhail Vysotsky (1791–1837)

== W ==
- Jacob Weinberg (1879–1956)
- Kazimierz Wiłkomirski (1900–1995)
- Alexander Winkler (1865–1935)
- Ivan Wyschnegradsky (1893–1979)

== Y ==
- Grigor Yeghiazaryan (1908–1988), born in present-day Turkey
- Makar Yekmalyan (1856–1905), born in present-day Armenia
- Mikhail Youdin (1893–1948)
- Yuri Yukechev (born 1947)
- Aleksandr Yurasovsky (1890–1922)

== Z ==
- Vsevolod Zaderatsky (1891–1953)
- Nikolai Zaremba (1821–1879)
- Marģeris Zariņš (1910–1993), born in present-day Latvia
- Aleksandr Zatsepin (born 1926)
- Leo Zeitlin (1884–1930)
- Asaf Zeynally (1909–1932)
- Valery Zhelobinsky (1913–1946)
- Aleksey Zhivotov (1904–1964)
- Mikhail Zhukov (1901–1960)
- Alexander Zhurbin (born 1945)
- Efrem Zimbalist (1889–1985)
- Vasily Zolotarev (1872–1964)
- Vladislav Zolotaryov (1942–1975)
- Mariya Zubova (1749–1799)

== See also ==
- Chronological list of Russian classical composers
- Lists of composers
- List of Russian people
