= Chronological list of Russian classical composers =

The following is a chronological list of classical music composers who live in, work in, or are citizens of Russia, or who have done so.

== Baroque ==
- Nikolay Diletsky (c. 1630 – after 1680)
- Symeon Pekalytsky (born c. 1630)
- Vasily Polikarpovich Titov (c. 1650 – c. 1715)
- Ivan Domaratsky (second half of the 17th century – first half of the 18th century)

== Classical era ==
- Ivan Kerzelli (fl. 18th century)
- Yekaterina Sinyavina (died 1784)
- Timofiy Bilohradsky (c. 1710 – c. 1782)
- Grigory Teplov (1711/1717–1779)
- Gregory Skovoroda (1722–1794)
- Yelizaveta Belogradskaya (c.1739 – c. 1764)
- Anna Bon (c. 1739 – after 1767)
- Vasily Pashkevich (c. 1742 – 1797)
- Maxim Berezovsky (c. 1745 – 1777)
- Ivan Khandoshkin (1747–1804)
- Mariya Zubova (1749–1799)
- Mikhail Matinsky (1750 – c. 1820)
- Dmitry Bortniansky (1751–1825)
- Mikhail Sokolovsky (1756–1795)
- Osip Kozlovsky (1757–1831)
- Yevstigney Fomin (1761–1800)
- Stepan Degtyarev (1766–1813)
- Aleksey Zhilin (c. 1766 – c. 1848)
- Artemy Vedel (c. 1767 – 1808)
- Daniil Kashin (1769–1841)
- Alexey Titov (1769–1827)
- Lev Gurilyov (1770–1844)
- Catterino Cavos (1775–1840)
- Stepan Davydov (1777 – 1825)

== Romantic ==
- Ekaterina Likoshin (1780–1840)
- Alexander Alyabyev (1787–1851)
- Mikhail Vielgorsky (1788–1856)
- Alexander Griboyedov (1795–1829)
- Alexei Lvov (1798–1870)
- Marie von Stedingk (1799–1868)
- Alexey Verstovsky (1799–1862)
- Katerina Maier (fl. c. 1800)
- Nikolai Titov (1800–1875)
- Alexander Egorovich Varlamov (1801–1848)
- Aleksander Gurilyov (1803–1858)
- Mikhail Glinka (1804–1857)
- Mykola Markevych (1804–1860)
- Alexandre Dubuque (1812–1897/8)
- Alexander Dargomyzhsky (1813–1869)
- Semen Hulak-Artemovsky (1813–1873)
- Alexander Serov (1820–1871)
- Nikolay Afanasyev (1821–1898)
- Nikolai Zaremba (1821–1879)
- Pyotr Bulakhov (1822–1885)
- Boris Sheremetev (1822–1906)
- Pavel Bulakhov (1824–1875)
- Boris Fitinhof-Schell (1829?–1901)
- Anton Rubinstein (1829–1894)
- Ivan Larionov (1830–1889)
- Martha von Sabinin (1831–1892)
- Petro Nishchynsky (1832–1896)
- Alexander Borodin (1833–1887)
- César Cui (1835–1918)
- Nikolai Rubinstein (1835–1881)
- Mily Balakirev (1837–1910)
- Karl Davydov (1838–1889)
- Modest Mussorgsky (1839–1881)
- Mikhail Azanchevsky (1839–1881)
- Pyotr Ilyich Tchaikovsky (1840–1893)
- Mykola Lysenko (1842–1912)
- Leonid Malashkin (1842–1902)
- Arkady Abaza (1843–1915)
- Nikolai Rimsky-Korsakov (1844–1908)
- Abai Qunanbaiuly (1845–1904)
- Achilles Alferaki (1846–1919)
- Ella Adayevskaya (1846–1926)
- Alexander Arkhangelsky (1846–1924)
- Valentina Serova (1846–1924)
- Nicolai Soloviev (1846–1916)
- David Nowakowsky (1848–1921)
- Nadezhda Rimskaya-Korsakova (1848–1919)
- Mikhail Ivanov (1849–1927)
- Alexander Taneyev (1850–1918)
- Vasily Safonov (1852–1918)
- Mykola Arkas (1853–1909)
- Nikolai Shcherbachov (1853–1922)
- Alexander Kopylov (1854–1911)
- Anatoly Lyadov (1855–1914)
- Alexander Kastalsky (1856–1926)
- Eduard Schütt (1856–1933)
- Sergei Taneyev (1856–1915)
- Nikoghayos Tigranian (1856–1951)
- Makar Yekmalyan (1856–1905)
- Nikolai Artsybushev (1858–1937)
- Alexander Ilyinsky (1859–1920)
- Nikolay Sokolov (1859–1922)
- Sergei Lyapunov (1859–1924)
- Arthur Friedheim (1859–1932)
- Mikhail Ippolitov-Ivanov (1859–1935)
- Victor Ewald (1860–1935)
- Anton Arensky (1861–1906)
- Georgy Catoire (1861–1926)
- Mikhail Matyushin (1861–1934)
- Georgi Conus (1862–1933)
- Felix Blumenfeld (1863–1931)
- Alexander Siloti (1863–1945)
- Vladimir Sokalsky (1863–1919)
- Alexander Gretchaninov (1864–1956)
- Baluan Sholak (1864–1919)
- Alexander Glazunov (1865–1936)
- Alexander Winkler (1865–1935)
- Vasily Kalinnikov (1866–1901)
- Vladimir Rebikov (1866–1920)
- Samuel Maykapar (1867–1938)
- Wassily Sapellnikoff (1867–1941)
- Leonid Nikolayev (1868–1942)
- Julius Conus (1869–1942)
- Vasily Kalafati (1869–1942)
- Viktor Kalinnikov (1870–1927)
- Arseny Koreshchenko (1870–1921)
- Emil Młynarski (1870–1835)
- Lev Conus (1871–1944)
- Nikolay Kedrov Sr. (1871–1940)
- Zacharia Paliashvili (1871–1933)
- Alexander Spendiaryan (1871–1928)
- Paul Juon (1872–1940)
- Leokadiya Kashperova (1872–1940)
- Alexander Scriabin (1872–1915)
- Sergei Vasilenko (1872–1956)
- Vasily Zolotarev (1872–1964)
- Witold Maliszewski (1873–1939)
- Sergei Rachmaninoff (1873–1943)
- Nikolai Tcherepnin (1873–1945)
- Elena Gnesina (1874–1967)
- Serge Koussevitzky (1874–1951)
- Sandra Droucker (1875–1944)
- Konstantin Eiges (1875–1950)
- Reinhold Glière (1875–1956)
- Aleksandr Goldenweiser (1875–1961)
- Alexander Koshetz (1875–1944)
- Grikor Suni (1876–1939)

== Modern/contemporary ==
- Sergei Bortkiewicz (1877–1952)
- Pavel Chesnokov (1877–1944)
- Alexander Goedicke (1877–1957)
- Yevgeny Gunst (1877–1950)
- Mykola Leontovych (1877–1921)
- Yuliya Veysberg (1878/80–1942)
- Ossip Gabrilowitsch (1878–1936)
- Huseyngulu Sarabski (1879–1945)
- Armen Tigranian (1879–1950)
- Jacob Weinberg (1879–1956)
- Nikolai Medtner (1880–1951)
- Nikolai Myaskovsky (1881–1950)
- Nikolai Roslavets (1881–1944)
- Joseph Rumshinsky (1881–1956)
- Leonid Sabaneyev (1881–1968)
- Vsevolod Zaderatsky (1881–1953)
- Lazare Saminsky (1882–1959)
- Kyrylo Stetsenko (1882–1922)
- Igor Stravinsky (1882–1971)
- Maximilian Steinberg (1883–1946)
- Alexander Vasilyevich Alexandrov (1883–1946)
- Mikhail Gnessin (1883–1957)
- Alexander Krein (1883–1951)
- Romanos Melikian (1883–1935)
- Yakiv Stepovy (1883–1921)
- Boris Asafyev (1884–1949)
- Vasily Agapkin (1884–1964)
- Zulfugar Hajibeyov (1884–1950)
- Leo Zeitlin (1884–1930)
- Vladimir Bakaleinikov (1885–1953)
- Uzeyir Hajibeyov (1885–1948)
- Muslim Magomayev (1885–1937)
- Joseph Achron (1886–1943)
- Arseny Avraamov (1886–1944)
- Moses Milner (1886–1953)
- Sargis Barkhudaryan (1887–1973)
- Ernest Pingoud (1887–1942)
- Yuri Shaporin (1887–1966)
- Julius Isserlis (1888–1968)
- Adrian Shaposhnikov (1888–1967)
- Alexei Stanchinsky (1888–1914)
- Mykola Vilinsky (1888–1956)
- Anatoly Alexandrov (1888–1982)
- Levko Revutsky (1889–1977)
- Vladimir Shcherbachev (1889–1952)
- Alexander Veprik (1889–1958)
- Victor Dolidze (1890–1933)
- Boris Pasternak (1890–1960)
- Samuil Feinberg (1890–1962)
- Aleksandr Yurasovsky (1890–1922)
- Issay Dobrowen (1891–1953)
- Nikolai Golovanov (1891–1953)
- Sergei Prokofiev (1891–1953)
- Alexander Chuhaldin (1892–1951)
- Arthur Lourié (1892–1966)
- Nikolai Obukhov (1892–1954)
- Aleksandr Gauk (1893–1963)
- Pylyp Kozytskiy (1893–1960)
- Leo Ornstein (1893–2002)
- Sergei Protopopov (1893–1954)
- Ivan Wyschnegradsky (1893–1979)
- Mikhail Youdin (1893–1948)
- Boris Ledkovsky (1894–1975)
- Samuel Pokrass (1894–1939)
- Nicolas Slonimsky (1894–1995)
- Dimitri Tiomkin (1894–1979)
- Boris Lyatoshinsky (1895–1968)
- Joseph Schillinger (1895–1943)
- Viktor Kosenko (1896–1938)
- Anatoliy Novikov (1896–1984)
- Sergei Aslamazyan (1897–1978)
- Lev Knipper (1898–1974)
- Alexander Veprik (1898–1958)
- Alexander Abramsky (1898–1985)
- Mischa Levitzki (1898–1941)
- Sophie Carmen Eckhardt-Gramatté (1899–1974)
- Dmitry Pokrass (1899–1978)
- Alexander Tcherepnin (1899–1977)
- Efrem Zimbalist (1889–1985)
- Isaak Dunayevsky (1900–1955)
- Isadore Freed (1900–1960)
- Alexander Mosolov (1900–1973)
- Kazimierz Wiłkomirski (1900–1995)
- Mikhail Zhukov (1901–1960)
- Artemi Ayvazyan (1902–1975)
- Sergey Balasanian (1902–1982)
- Serge Conus (1902–1988)
- Vladimir Fere (1902–1971)
- Mansur Muzafarov (1902–1966)
- Niescier Sakałoŭski (1902–1950)
- Vissarion Shebalin (1902–1963)
- Andriy Shtoharenko (1902–1992)
- Vladimir Vlasov (1902/3–1986)
- Vernon Duke (1903–1969)
- Varvara Gaigerova (1903–1944)
- Vladimir Horowitz (1903–1989)
- Aram Khachaturian (1903–1978)
- Matvey Blanter (1903–1990)
- Yuliy Meitus (1903–1997)
- Nicolas Nabokov (1903–1978)
- Dmitry Kabalevsky (1904–1987)
- Gavriil Popov (1904–1972)
- Aleksey Zhivotov (1904–1964)
- Boris Alexandrovich Alexandrov (1905–1994)
- Boris Arapov (1905–1992)
- Yevgeny Brusilovsky (1905–1981)
- Kostiantyn Dankevych (1905–1984)
- André Hossein (1905–1983)
- Nikolay Kedrov Jr. (1905–1981)
- Daniil Pokrass (1905–1954)
- Alexander Fridlender (1906–1980)
- Zara Levina (1906–1976)
- Dmitri Shostakovich (1906–1975)
- Alexander Tsfasman (1906–1971)
- Afrasiyab Badalbeyli (1907–1976)
- Konstantin Ivanov (1907–1984)
- Dmitri Klebanov (1907–1987)
- Said Rustamov (1907–1983)
- Tolibjon Sadikov (1907–1957)
- Vasily Solovyov-Sedoi (1907–1979)
- Antonio Spadavecchia (1907–1977)
- Julian Scriabin (1908–1919)
- Vano Muradeli (1908–1970)
- Nina Makarova (1908–1976)
- Nikolai Rakov (1908–1990)
- Grigor Yeghiazaryan (1908–1988)
- Ivan Dzerzhinsky (1909–1978)
- Boris Mokrousov (1909–1968)
- Asaf Zeynally (1909–1932)
- Evgeny Golubev (1910–1988)
- Soulima Stravinsky (1910–1994)
- Näcip Cihanov (1911–1988)
- Dangatar Ovezov (1911–1966)
- Vladimir Ussachevsky (1911–1990)
- Mukhtar Ashrafi (1912–1975)
- Niyazi Hajibeyov (1912–1984)
- Yuri Levitin (1912–1993)
- Igor Markevitch (1912–1983)
- Vadim Salmanov (1912–1978)
- Anatoly Bogatyrev (1913–2003)
- Nikita Bogoslovsky (1913–2004)
- Veniamin Fleishman (1913–1941)
- Boris Goltz (1913–1942)
- Tikhon Khrennikov (1913–2007)
- Heorhiy Maiboroda (1913–1992)
- Valery Zhelobinsky (1913–1946)
- Sasha Argov (1914–1995)
- Serafim Tulikov (1914–2004)
- Grigory Frid (1915–2012)
- Albert Leman (1915–1998)
- Georgy Sviridov (1915–1998)
- Mutal Burhonov (1916–2002)
- Oleg Lundstrem (1916–2005)
- Veli Mukhatov (1916–2005)
- Tofig Guliyev (1917–2000)
- Jovdat Hajiyev (1917–2002)
- Gayane Chebotaryan (1918–1998)
- Gara Garayev (1918–1982)
- Galina Ustvolskaya (1919–2006)
- Mieczysław Weinberg (1919–1996)
- Aleksandr Lokshin (1920–1987)
- Yan Frenkel (1920–1989)
- Karen Khachaturian (1920–2011)
- Aleksandr Lokshin (1920–1987)
- German Galynin (1922–1966)
- Kirill Molchanov (1922–1982)
- Revol Bunin (1924–1976)
- Tatiana Nikolayeva (1924–1993)
- Mikhaïl Nosyrev (1924–1981)
- Andrei Eshpai (1925–2015)
- Lyudmila Lyadova (1925–2021)
- Lev Naumov (1925–2005)
- Vladimir Vavilov (1925–1973)
- Boris Tchaikovsky (1925–1996)
- Veniamin Basner (1925–1996)
- Vladimir Shainsky (1925–2017)
- Boris Parsadanian (1925–1997)
- Irina Elcheva (1926–2013)
- Aleksandr Zatsepin (born 1926)
- Vitaly Bujanovsky (1928–1993)
- Yevgeny Svetlanov (1928–2002)
- Edison Denisov (1929–1996)
- Aleksandra Pakhmutova (born 1929)
- Dmitriĭ Dmitrievich Blagoĭ (1930–1986)
- Nikolai Karetnikov (1930–1994)
- Andrey Petrov (1930–2006)
- Nikolaï Sidelnikov (1930–1992)
- Mikael Tariverdiev (1931–1996)
- Sofia Gubaidulina (born 1931)
- Murad Kajlayev (born 1931)
- German Okunev (1931–1973)
- Fyodor Druzhinin (1932–2007)
- Rodion Shchedrin (1932–2025)
- Sergei Slonimsky (1932–2020)
- Iosif Andriasov (1933–2000)
- Andrei Volkonsky (1933–2008)
- Yevgeny Krylatov (1934–2019)
- Zhanneta Metallidi (1934–2019)
- Alfred Schnittke (1934–1998)
- Leonid Hrabovsky (born 1935)
- Sandor Kalloś (born 1935)
- Vyacheslav Ovchinnikov (1936–2019)
- Eduard Artemyev (born 1937)
- Nektarios Chargeishvili (1937–1971)
- Misha Geller (1937–2007)
- Nikolai Kapustin (1937–2020)
- Valentyn Silvestrov (born 1937)
- Valery Gavrilin (1939–1999)
- Tigran Mansuryan (born 1939)
- Vyacheslav Nagovitsin (born 1939)
- Boris Tishchenko (1939–2010)
- Vyacheslav Artyomov (born 1940)
- Igor Khudolei (1940–2001)
- Anatoliy Andreyev (1941–2004)
- Boris Feoktistov (born 1941)
- Vladislav Shoot (born 1941)
- Viktor Suslin (1942–2012)
- Vladislav Zolotaryov (1942–1975)
- Alexander Knaifel (born 1943)
- Alexander Vustin (born 1943)
- Tatyana Chudova (1944–2021)
- Alexander Zhurbin (born 1945)
- Vladimir Martynov (born 1946)
- Alexander Mordukhovich (born 1946)
- Yury Chernavsky (1947–2025)
- Vladimir Kobekin (born 1947)
- Grigoriy Korchmar (born 1947)
- Nikolai Korndorf (1947–2001)
- Vasily Lobanov (born 1947)
- Yuri Yukechev (born 1947)
- Alexander Goldstein (born 1948)
- Yakov Kazyansky (born 1948)
- Dmitri Smirnov (1948–2020)
- Leonid Bobylev (born 1949)
- Alexander Gradsky (1949–2021)
- Elena Firsova (born 1950)
- Yelena Konshina (born 1950)
- Tatyana Sergeyeva (born 1951)
- Mikhail Kollontay (born 1952)
- Lev Konov (born 1952)
- Alla Pavlova (born 1952)
- Victor Kissine (born 1953)
- Sergei Pavlenko (born 1953)
- Alexander Raskatov (born 1953)
- Leonid Desyatnikov (born 1955)
- Yuri Kasparov (born 1955)
- Alexander Levine (born 1955)
- Alexander Radvilovich (born 1955)
- Masguda Shamsutdinova (born 1955)
- Vladimir Tarnopolsky (born 1955)
- Nikita Koshkin (born 1956)
- Alexander Rosenblatt (born 1956)
- Alexandre Danilevski (born 1957)
- Mikhail Pletnev (born 1957)
- Yekaterina Chemberdzhi (born 1960)
- Ivan Sokolov (born 1960)
- Andrei Krylov (born 1961)
- Abdalla El-Masri (born 1962)
- Andrey Zelenskiy (born 1963)
- Peter Chernobrivets (born 1965)
- Yuri Khanon (born 1965)
- Fred Momotenko (born 1970)
- Dmitry Malikov (born 1970)
- Evgeny Kissin (born 1971)
- Sergej Newski (born 1972)
- Lera Auerbach (born 1973)
- Boris Elkis (born 1973)
- Irina Emeliantseva (born 1973)
- Olesya Rostovskaya (born 1975)
- Lev Zhurbin (born 1978)
- Tony Vilgotsky (born 1980)
- Nikolay Sivchuk (born 1981)
- Timur Ismagilov (born 1982)
- Alissa Firsova (born 1986)
- Sonya Belousova (born 1990)
- Vyacheslav Kruglik
- Anastasiya Bespalova
- Svetlana Nesterova
