= Symeon Pekalytsky =

Symeon Pekalytsky (Ukrainian: Симеон Пекалицький), sometimes Semen Pekalytsky (Ukrainian: Семен Пекалицький) or Simeon Pekalitsky (born c. 1630) was a Ukrainian composer, choral director and teacher. He wrote partsong choral works.

== Biography ==
Very little is known about his life. He was born in Ukraine in c. 1630 and studied in high schools of Kyiv, Lviv, Ostroh or Lutsk. He had gained a profound musical education.

In the 1660s Pekalytsky led the Chapel of Chernihiv archbishop Lazar Baranovych. We can assume that Lazar Baranovych drew attention to talented youth. In the mid 1660s Tsar became interested in the possibility of the introduction of polyphonic singing in Russian church. In 1666 Chernihiv choir moved to Moscow where it worked for almost a year with his choir of eight singers after having his chapel's musical excellence become well-known. Pekalytsky had gained a possibility to demonstrate his music and conducting mastery.

In 1667 he became a choirmaster of the Chapel of Iosyf Shumliansky in Lviv and during this time, he taught music theory and singing lessons. In 1673 he was again invited to Moscow to lead the Chapel at the court. In the 1680s he returned to Ukraine and settled in Novhorod-Siverskyi.

A Liturgy in 8 voices of Symeon Pekalytsky is referred to in the registry of scores of the year 1687 of Lviv Bratska school. He also wrote other works including several choral concertos.

== Recordings ==
- 1995: Chamber Choir "Khreshchatik" (Larissa Bukhonska)
- 2008: Chamber Choir "Kyiv": Simeon Pekalytsky "Sacred Works"
- 2019: Kyiv Chamber Choir: Sacred Treasures: Masterpieces Of Ukrainian Choral Music XV-IXX Centuries
