= Ion Melnik =

Russian composer (1935–2018)

Ion S. Melnik (Russian: Ион Мельник, born October 11, 1935, Moscow, Soviet Union; died November 15, 2018, Atlanta, Georgia, United States) was a Russian and Soviet era composer. His compositions include songs, choruses, instrumental music, and music to documentary films.

== Education ==
Ion Melnik began his musical education at the age of seven when he joined the children's ensemble of the USSR Ministry of Railways (Russian: Детский Ансамбль Песни и Пляски Центрального Дома Детей Железнодорожников) where he played the first domra and later became the concertmaster of the orchestra. The music director of the ensemble was Simon Osipovich Dunaevsky (Russian: Семён Осипович Дунаевский), a brother of the legendary Soviet era composer, Isaak Osipovich Dunaevsky (Russian: Исаак Осипович Дунаевский). In 1948, Isaak Osipovich Dunaevsky recommended that Ion Melnik enroll in the Seminar of Young Composers of the USSR's Union of Composers (Russian: Семинар Молодых Композиторов при Союзе Композиторов СССР). At the Seminar, Ion Melnik studied composition under Igor Mikhailovich Belorusets (Russian: Игорь Михайлович Белорусец), an assistant to Mikhail Fibianovich Gnessin (Russian: Михаил Фабианович Гнесин). After the Seminar, Ion Melnik continued to study composition at the Music College affiliated with the Moscow State Conservatory (named after Tchaikovsky) and the Leningrad State Conservatory named after Rimsky-Korsakov. His teachers included Julian Grigorievich Krein (Russian: Юлиан Григорьевич Крейн), Grigory Samuilovich Frid (Russian: Григорий Самуилович Фрид), Sergei Mikhailovich Slonimsky (Russian: Сергей Михайлович Слонимский).

== Music ==
1955-58, military service in the Ensemble of the Northern Fleet (Russian: Ансамбль Песни и Пляски Северного Флота) where he played the viola. While there, he composed a number of songs including "Belomorskaya Lyricheskaya" (Russian: Беломорская Лирическая) which was included in the repertoire of the Ensemble. In 1962, he established an ensemble in the air defense forces of the Moscow region (Russian: Ансамбль МО ПВО). He continued to serve as the director and conductor of the ensemble until 1971. With this ensemble, he performed his composition "Volzhskaya Krucha" dedicated to the battle of Stalingrad on the Goluboy Ogonyek TV program (Russian: Голубой Огонёк) dedicated to the 25th anniversary of the victory in the Great Patriotic War. Starting in the late 1950s, Ion Melnik began to work with the Theater of Front Novels (Russian: Театр Фронтовых Новелл). This theater was founded by two veterans of World War II, a hero of the USSR, vice-admiral Georgi Nikitich Holostyakov (Russian: Георгий Никитич Холостяков) and Seraphim Ivanovich Kytaev (Russian: Серафим Иванович Китаев). Beginning with 1959, Ion Melnik became the musical director of the theater and remained in that capacity until 1990. Ion Melnik also served as the musical director of the Octet of the Veterans of the Krasnoznamenny Ensemble (Russian: Дважды Краснознамённый Академический ансамбль песни и пляски имени А. В. Александрова). In 1985, Ion Melnik founded a wind orchestra at one of the main recreational state parks of the city of Moscow, Sokolniki. He composed music to two documentary films: DOSAAF - Rodine (1984), Rodinu Gotovsja Zashishat (1986). The march from the first film was officially adapted as the anthem of DOSAAF in the 1980s. Chorus music plays an important role in the art of Ion Melnik. He has composed numerous songs. His songs have been used on central TV, radio, in concerts, including three performances at the Kremlin Palace (Russian: Кремлёвский Дворец Съездов), and publications.
