= Aleksandr Yurasovsky =

Russian conductor and composer

Alexander Ivanovich Yurasovsky Александр Иванович Юрасовский
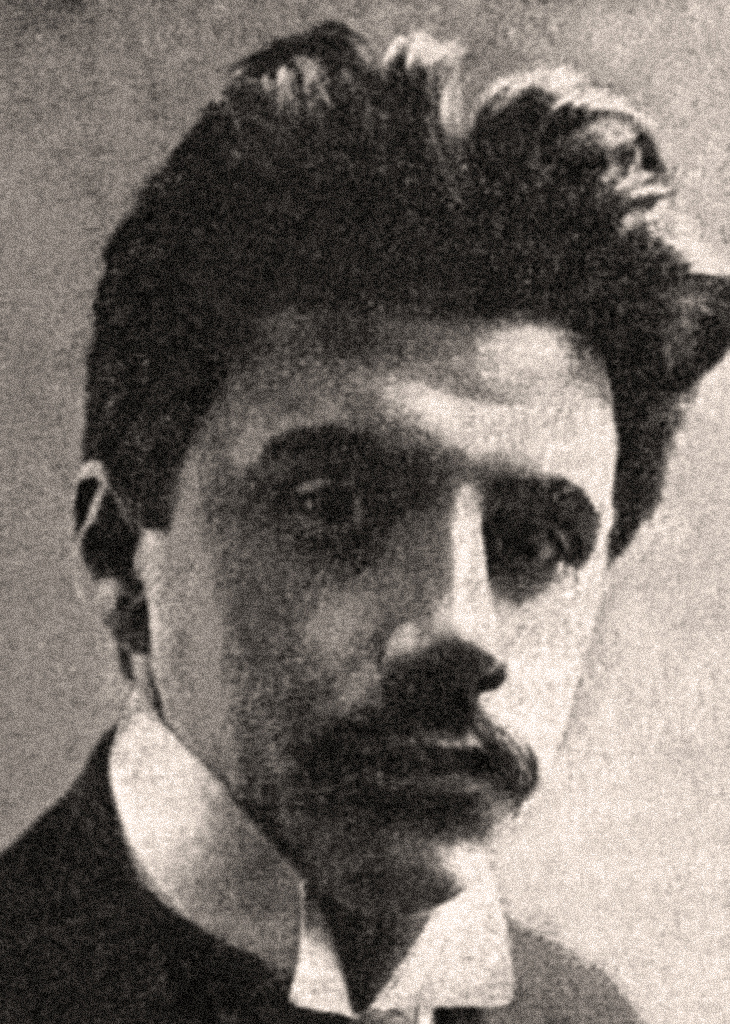

Background information
- Born: June 15, 1890; Mishkovo, Oryol district, Russian Empire
- Died: January 31, 1922 (aged 31); Moscow, Russian SFSR, Soviet Union
- Occupation(s): Conductor, composer

Alexander Ivanovich Yurasovsky (Note: Russian: Александр Иванович Юрасовский, romanized: Aleksandr Ivanovich Yurasovsky) (Note: In this name that follows East Slavic naming customs, the patronymic is Ivanovich and the family name is Yurasovsky.) (June 15, 1890 – January 31, 1922) was a conductor and composer active in the Russian Empire and later in the Soviet Union.

== Biography ==
Yurasovsky was born in the town of Mishkovo located within the Oryol district. He was the grandson of violinist Vasiliǐ Zhakharovich (1842-1907) and son of the opera singer Nadezhda Vasil'evna Salina (1864-1955). He studied piano with E.P. Savina and musical composition with Peter Nikolaevich Renchitsky, Reinhold Glière and Alexander Gretchaninov, graduating from Moscow University in 1913 with a degree in law. He made his conducting debut in 1912. After time in the Russian Army from 1914 to 1917, he resumed his musical activity, conducting concerts in Kharkiv, Odessa, and Rostov-on-Don.

He held administrative and conducting positions, and orchestrated Sergei Rachmaninoff's Suite No. 2 as well as Suite of Preludes (containing preludes Op. 23, No 3, 4, 10, and Op. 32, No 12, 13).

== List of works ==
Opera

- Trilby (libretto by composer from the novel by George du Maurier)

Orchestra works

- In the Moonlight, op. 6 (1911)
- Pastel (2 Pictures, 1911)
- Ghosts, symphonic poem, op. 8 (1912)
- Spring Symphony (1918)
- Poem-concerto for piano and orchestra (1918)
- Suite (1922)

Chamber music

- Dramatic sonata cello and piano. (1911)
- Piano Trio (1911)

Piano music

- 4 Preludes (1910)
- Sonata dramatique, op. 3 (1910)
- 6 The way of love songs (lyrics by A. Allyn, 1912)
- 3 songs (lyrics by Nekrasov, 1913),
- 14 recitations to music
- music for productions of dramas, including "The Prince and the manor" (1914)
- 6 improvisations (1915) 3 ensembles for women 's voices with AF. (1913) for voice and piano
