= Peter Chernobrivets =

Russian musicologist, composer and lecturer

Peter Anatolievich Chernobrivets
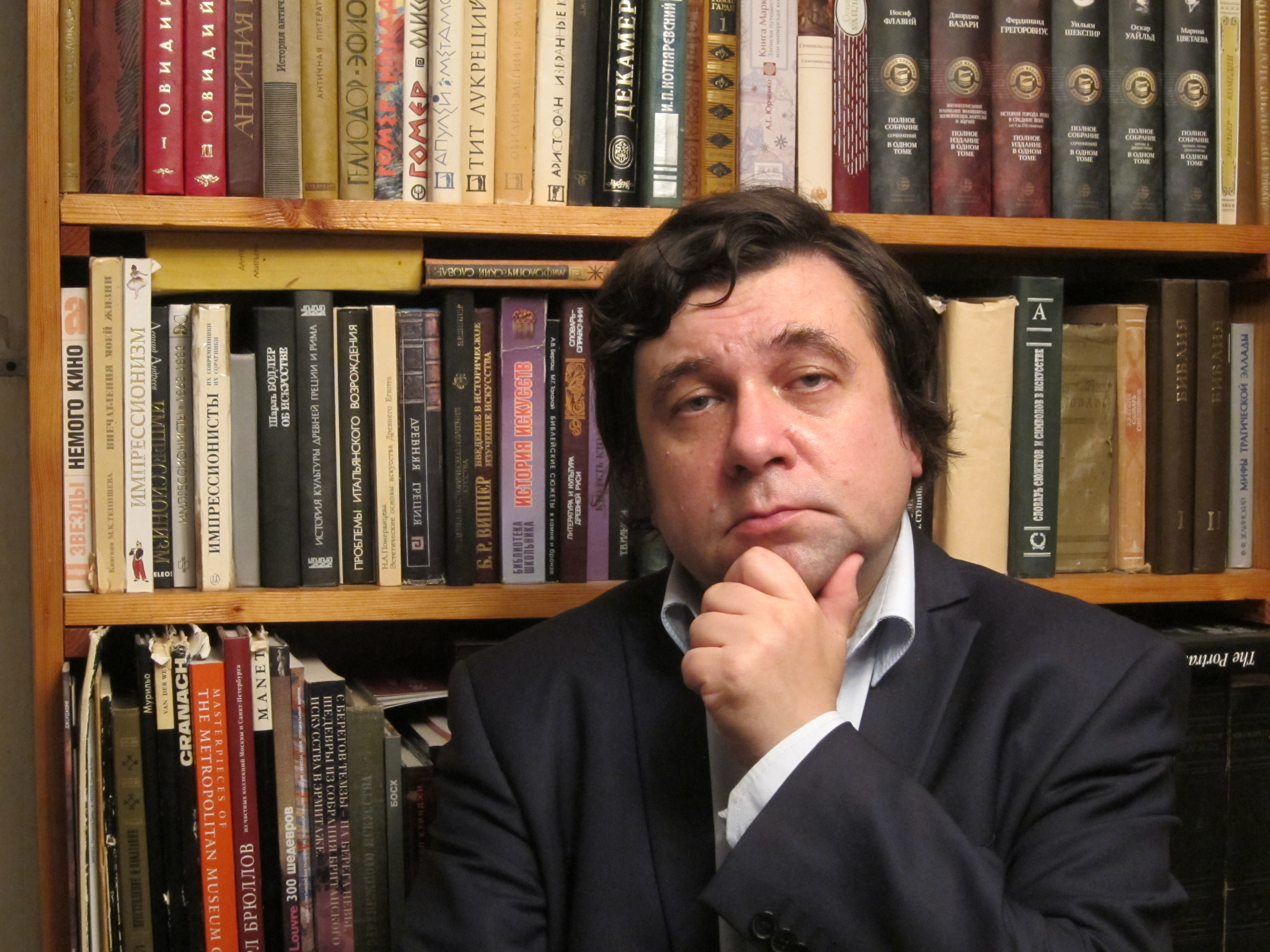
- Peter Anatolievich Chernobrivets. 2016
- Born: 24 August 1965; Leningrad, USSR

Peter Anatolievich Chernobrivets (Russian: Пётр Анато́льевич Чернобри́вец, born on 24 August 1965 in Leningrad, USSR) is a Russian musicologist, composer and lecturer.

== Biography ==
Chernobrivets was born in Leningrad in 1965. Chernobrivets is an author of compositions for a piano, instrumental company, and a chamber orchestra that have been performed in well-known concert halls of Saint Petersburg and other cities of Russia. In April 2015 and April 2016, two author's concerts called “Dialogue of musical temperaments. Compositions in traditional and non-traditional musical tuning” took place on the new stage of The Mariinsky Theatre. At present, he is an assistant professor of the Department of musical theory of The N. A. Rimsky-Korsakov Saint Petersburg State Conservatory teaching the courses of harmony and musical aesthetics.

== Main scientific publications ==
=== Monograph ===
- Chernobrivets, Peter. Basics of musical aesthetics. Saint Petersburg, 2014. [In Russian].

=== Large-size articles ===
External videos
- Peter Chernobrivets. 20-tone equal temperament system. Saint Petersburg Conservatory. 13.04.2013.

External videos
- Peter Chernobrivets. 5-miniature cycle for a violin and a clavier. The Mariinsky Theatre. 21.04.2016.

- Chernobrivets, Peter. Some principles of textural development in instrumental compositions by Handel. Problems of the texture. Collection of papers. Saint Petersburg, 1992, p. 113-127. [In Russian].
- Chernobrivets, Peter. Melody as a function. Musiqi dünyasi. 4/49. 2011. P. 10–21
- Chernobrivets, Peter. The knight of the counterpoint (in memory of O. Kolovskiy). Our teachers. Collection of memoirs of the teachers of the Department of musical theory of the Leningrad (Saint Petersburg) Conservatory. Saint Petersburg, 2006. P. 23–31.
