= Boris Goltz =

Soviet composer (1913 - 1942)

Boris Grigorevich Goltz (Russian: Борис Григорьевич Гольц; 16 December (OS) / 29 December 1913 – 3 March 1942), was a Soviet composer. He is remembered today mainly for his set of 24 Preludes, Op. 2, for piano.

He was born in Tashkent, Russian Empire. He moved with his family to Leningrad in 1926. In 1933 entered the Leningrad Conservatory, initially as a piano student, working with Nikolayev. His harmony teacher, V. V. Pushkov, persuaded him to take up composing seriously, and he obtained a double degree in piano (graduated 1938) and composition (graduated 1940).

Russian involvement in World War II commenced in 1941. Goltz volunteered for the Army, but was instead assigned to the Political Administration of the Baltic Fleet, to compose patriotic songs. Several of his songs, such as Shining Star in the Heavens, The Song of Anger and The Song of Vengeance, became very popular during the war. He worked in inhuman conditions during the Siege of Leningrad, and died six months after the start of the Siege, of illness caused by malnutrition.

Few of Goltz's works were published in his lifetime, and most are lost. His 24 Preludes, Op. 2 have been recorded by Sergei Podobedov, issued on the Music & Arts label.

== Bibliography ==
- Akhonen, Aleksandra, O leningradskom kompozitore Borise Goltze (1913–1942), Musicus, 2005.
- Frid, Rafael Zalmanovich, Boris Grigorevich Goltz: Ocherk zhizni i tvorchestva. Leningrad: Soviet Composer, 1960.
- Goltz, B. 24 Preliudii dla fortepiano. Leningrad, Izd. Musika, 1971.
- Roy, Matthew J., The genesis of the Soviet prelude set for piano: Shostakovich, Zaderatsky, Zhelobinsky, and Goltz. Thesis, Eastern Washington University, 2012.
- Skorbyashenskaya, Olga, Boris Goltz (1913-1942), 2008. (Notes accompanying Complete works for solo piano, Sergei Podobedov (piano), Music & Arts, ASIN: B01K8O87SO.)
