= Alexander Radvilovich =

Russian composer

Alexander Yurevich Radvilovich
- Александр Юрьевич Радвилович
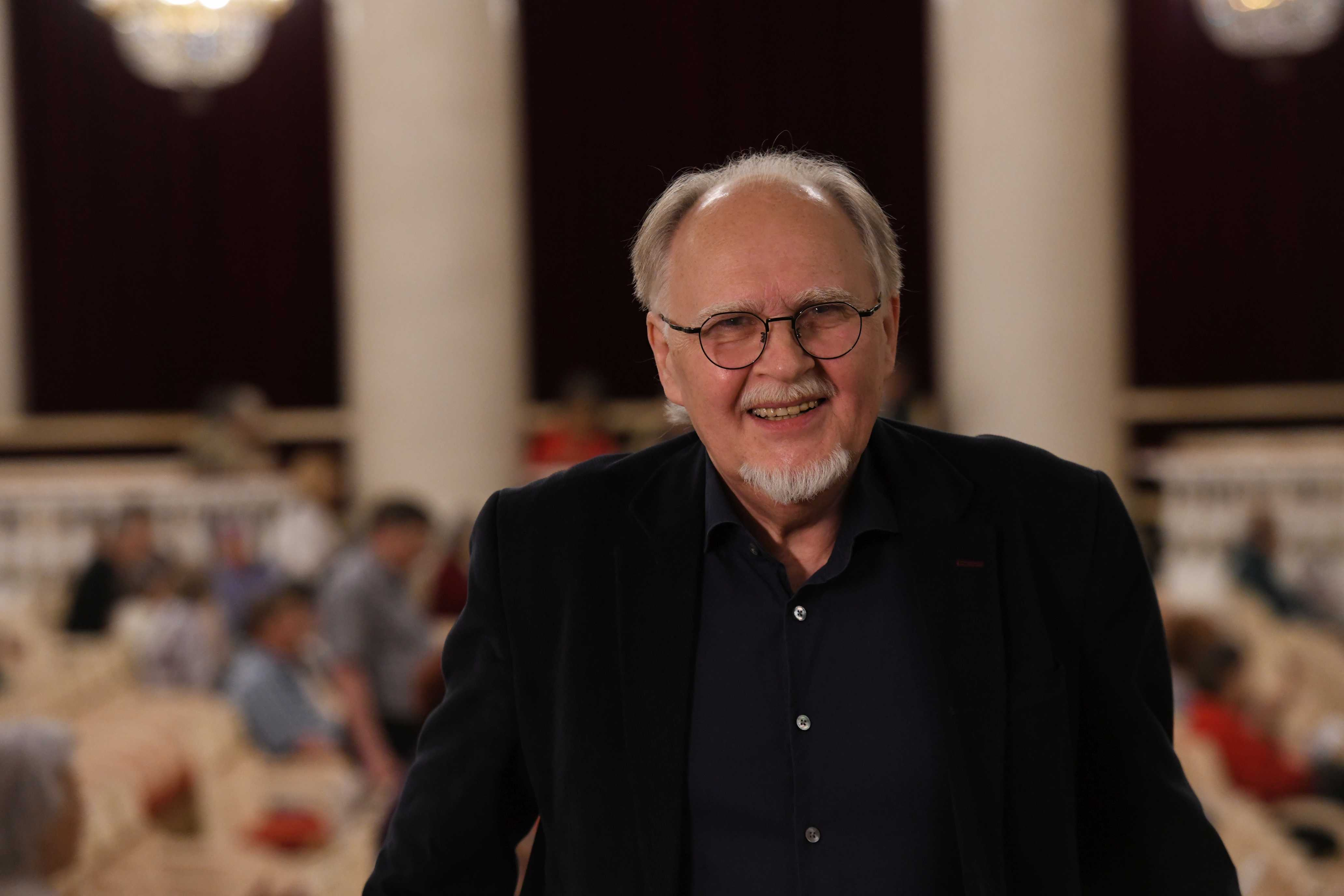
- Alexander Radvilovich in 2023
- Born: February 28, 1955; Leningrad, Russian SFSR, Soviet Union
- Education: Special Music School, St. Petersburg Conservatory, 1973; St. Petersburg Conservatory, 1978
- Occupations: Composer and Lecturer

Alexander Yuryevich Radvilovich (Russian: Александр Юрьевич Радвилович; born 1955) is a Russian composer, pianist, teacher, and lecturer from Leningrad (Saint Petersburg) who specializes in contemporary music discourses. He is the recipient of numerous domestic and foreign awards, and has had his compositions performed internationally, including Germany, Finland, the United Kingdom, and the United States. His musical style focuses on exploiting the extremes of music in order to create from them new modes of communication which are both accessible in nature for listeners yet complex in its language.

== Education ==
From 1962 to 1973, Alexander studied in the Secondary Specialized Music School within the St. Petersburg Conservatory in piano and theory with the composer Vladimir Arzumanov. Alexander happened to be his first graduate, and due to this close relationship he would introduce Alexander to Nikolas Slonimsky. Alexander would go onto study at the St. Petersburg Conservatory in the faculty of composition under Slonimsky, graduating in 1978 and continuing his education through participation in numerous courses and private tutorship with European (non-Russian) composers like Witold Lutoslavsky, Boguslaw Schaeffer, Ton de Leeuw, and Klaus Huber.

== Career ==
He is known for his symphonies of two of his own poems called Legend About Violinist and Pushkin. At one time, after reading Fyodor Dostoyevsky he composed a string quartet called The Boy at Christ’s New Year Celebration and also designed a mini opera called Let’s Write Fairy-tale. He also composed an opera called Hindrance which was based on Danii Kharms' poem Ruin of the Gods. Currently he is a member of both Russian Composer’s and Saint Petersburg Composer's Unions and works as music pedagogue at the Humanitarian University of the Petersburg Conservatory. On occasion, he tours the world as composer, pianist. His music is published and performed by various labels and ensembles in countries such as Russia, as Austria (ARBOS - Company for Music and Theatre), the Netherlands and the United States. He is the founder and artistic director of the annual festival Sound Ways International Festival of New Music, dedicated to the presentation of contemporary music, and has served on competition jurys in countries such as Germany, Ukraine, and France.

== Works ==
=== Piano ===
- 1973-74: Five Russian songs for piano
- 1976/80: Sotto voce - three pieces for piano
- 1982: Sonata for piano
- 1999: "Labyrinth" for two pianos
- 1993: "Galoshes of happiness" - for reader and piano four hands based on the fairy tale by G.Kh. Andersen
- 1994: Se(a)iten for extended piano
- 2008: Code of the Universe - concert etude for piano
- 2007: Classic Smile, dedicated to S. Slonimsky for piano

=== Symphonic ===
- The Legend of the Violinist
- Claustrophobia
- Music for the Care of the Soul

=== Orchestral ===
- 1975: Elegy for chamber orchestra
- 1976: Poem for violin and orchestra
- 1977: Symphony No. 1 for symphony orchestra and male choir. Text by Katri Vala
- 2008: "Incredible Stories" for reciter and orchestra on texts by D. Bisset

=== Ensemble ===
- 2011: "Premonition of Winter" for bass flute, cor anglais and bass clarinet
- 2012: Dramma per musica for nine musicians (Fl/Picc, Cl, Fag, Cor, Pno, 2 Vns, Vla, Cello)
- 2015: SHOAH for ensemble (Fl, Cl/Cl.bass, Percussion, Piano, Vno, Vla, Cello)
- 2017: Alpine Requiem for amplified vocal quartet, piano and percussion on liturgical texts of the Requiem
- 2019: S'élognant dans le brouilliard ("Leaving into the fog") for clarinet and ensemble
- 2019: “In those days when in the gardens of the Lyceum” for ensemble (Fl, Cl, Vno, Vc, Pno)
- 2014: Musica lugubre for piano and ensemble (Fl, Cl/Cl.bass, Vno, Vla, Cello)
