= Ekaterina Likoshin =

Russian pianist and composer

Ekaterina Likoshin (Russian: Екатерина Ликошин; fl. 1800–1810) was a Russian pianist and composer who published short works for keyboard in St. Petersburg through publisher F.A. Dittmar. She is thought to have been employed by Count Uvarov.

== Works ==
Selected works include:

- Six polonaises et dix écossaises
- Fragmens de mon passé temps contenants differentes danses
