= Mikhail Nosyrev =

Soviet composer (1924–1981)

Mikhail Iosifovich Nosyrev (Russian: Михаил Иосифович Но́сырев; May 28, 1924 – March 28, 1981) was a Soviet composer. He was born in Leningrad and died in Voronezh.

== Biography ==
Nosyrev was born in Leningrad on May 28, 1924 and quickly began learning violin and piano at the age of eight. In 1941, during World War II, he was a first year student at the Leningrad Conservatory. Two years later he became an orchestra soloist at the radio orchestra of Leningrad.

In 1943, Nosyrev was arrested by the NKVD along with his mother and stepfather and condemned to death according to the Article 58 of the penal code of the RSFSR. The main evidence of the counter-revolutionary activities of Nosyrev was his diary discovered during the search of his home containing "anti-Soviet" content. One month later, his death penalty was commuted into ten years in a gulag, that he served in the camp of Vorkuta in the Komi ASSR, 2,500 km away from Moscow. He began composing during his prison sentence. After serving his term, he was exiled in the town of Syktyvkar where he worked as the conductor of the State Theater due to a loss of civil rights for a period of five years.

From 1958 to 1981, Nosyrev was the director of the opera and ballet theater of Voronezh.

In 1967, he became a member of the Union of Soviet Composers. His membership in it was supported by Dmitri Shostakovich's recommendation.

He wrote four symphonies, three concertos (for violin, piano and cello), four string quartets, the ballets The Unforgettable, The River Don Cossacks, Song of Triumphant Love (from Ivan Turgenev's novel of the same name) and around 100 pieces of chamber music.

In 1988, seven years after his death at the age of 56, he was completely forgiven by the Supreme Court of the USSR.

== Works ==
=== Symphonies ===
- First Symphony (1965)
- The Second Symphony in Memory of D. D. Shostakovich (1977)
- Third Symphony (1978)
- Fourth Symphony (1980)

=== Concerts ===
- Concerto for Violin and Orchestra (1971)
- Concerto for Cello and Orchestra (1973)
- Concerto for Piano and Orchestra (1974)

=== Ballets ===
- "This Cannot Be Forgotten" (1966)
- "Song of Triumphant Love" (1969) - based on the story by I. S. Turgenev
- "The Don Freemen" (1976)

=== Chamber instrumental works ===
- Sonatina for piano (1947)
- Four Preludes for Harp (1964)
- Nocturne for Flute and Piano (1968)
- Three Quartets (1968, 1972, 1980)

=== Essays of different genres ===
- Fairy Tale. Symphonic Poem (1947)
- Capriccio for violin and orchestra (1957)
- Ballad of a Fallen Warrior for soloist, choir and orchestra (1958)
- Nocturne for mixed choir a cappella (1979)
