= Nektarios Chargeishvili =

Russian composer (1937–1971)

- ნექტარიოს ჩარგეიშვილი
- Born: September 5, 1937; Leningrad, Russian SFSR, USSR
- Died: November 14, 1971 (aged 34); Moscow, Russian SFSR, USSR
- Resting place: New Athos, Georgia
- Other name: Nikolai Yakovlev
- Education: Moscow Conservatory; State University of Moscow
- Occupations: Composer, teacher
- Employer: Moscow Conservatory
- Notable work: Symphony (1971)

Nektarios Nektariosovich Chargeishvili (Georgian: ნექტარიოს ჩარგეიშვილი; 5 September 1937 – 14 November 1971) was a Russian/Soviet and Georgian composer, as well as an educator and a philosopher. He was known for his political outspokenness against the Soviet regime which led to his being ostracised, his music prohibited from performance or distribution, and to being dismissed from his teaching position at the Moscow Conservatory. His struggles to maintain any kind of career after his dismissal—he was even denied a job as a bus-driver—led to a serious deterioration in his mental health, and eventually to his suicide at the age of 34.

== Life and career ==
Born in Leningrad, Nektarios Chargeishvili grew up in Abkhazia, then spent most of his life in Moscow. He graduated from the Moscow Conservatory in 1963, followed by postgraduate studies with Tikhon Khrennikov and Aram Khachaturian. He taught score reading and instrumentation at the Conservatory from 1966 to 1968. In 1969, he studied philosophy at Moscow State University.

Pursuing the traditions of the Russian symphony, he composed two one-act ballets from popular stories, The absence of Dobrynya (Три года Добрынюшка стольничал) in 1963 and Dobrynia subdued the Chubis (чудь покорил) in 1965, and a symphonic poem inspired by a song by Kircha Danilov in 1965. Chargeishvili also composed in the style of Renaissance music (Suite for string orchestra in memory of C. Monteverdi, 1967). His Symphony (1971) was hailed as a masterpiece by Schnittke and Gubaidulina, but remained unperformed until 1990. He also composed music for several films, some under the pseudonym Nikolai Yakovlev, and worked as a music editor for the Bolshoi Ballet, including making an arrangement of Prokofiev's Lieutenant Kijé suite for them.

He also wrote a philosophical treatise Esoteric Doctrine of Christianity.

After being critical of the Soviet regime, he was dismissed from the Moscow Conservatory. After that, he struggled to find work (he was even denied a job as a bus driver), and his mental health deteriorated. On 14 November 1971, he committed suicide by hanging. He is buried in New Athos, Georgia.

== Works ==
=== Orchestral works ===
- Scherzo for Orchestra (1957)
- Suite for Orchestra (1957)
- The Return of the Prodigal Son (1967)
- Concerto No. 1 for chamber orchestra with cymbal (1959)
- Concerto for orchestra (1960)
- Concerto No. 2 for chamber orchestra (1962)
- The absence of Dobrynya (1963)
- Symphonic poem by Kirsch Danilov (1965)
- Dobrynia subdued the Chubis (чудь покорил) (1965)
- Concerto for violin and orchestra (1966)
- Suite for string orchestra in memory of C. Monteverdi (1967)
- Symphony (1971)

=== Film music ===
NB: some films are credited under the pseudonym N. Yakovlev

- I bought a dad (1962)
- The Secret to Success (1962)
- Dimka (1963)
- The Traveler with Luggage (1965)
- I loved you (1968)
- In the country of unlearned lessons (1969)
