= Petro Nishchynsky =

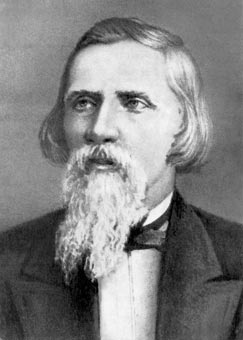
Petro Nishchynsky

Petro Ivanovych Nishchynsky (Ukrainian: Петро Іванович Ніщинський; September 9, 1832 – March 4, 1896) was a Ukrainian linguist and composer. He was born in the village of Nemenka, currently in the Vinnytsia Oblast of Ukraine.
