= Alexander Mordukhovich =

Russian composer

Alexander Mordukhovich (born March 28, 1946 in Zlatoust) is a Russian composer and musician.

== See also ==
- Music of Russia
