= Martha von Sabinin =

Russian composer and pianist (1831–1892)

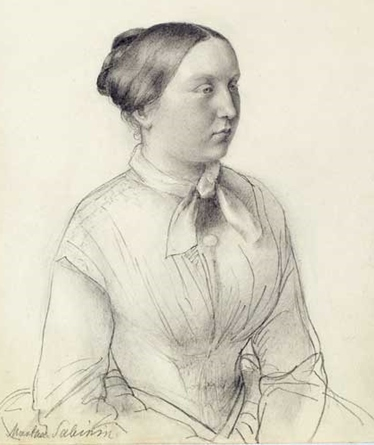
Martha von Sabinin

Martha von Sabinin (30 May 1831 – 1892) was a Russian composer and pianist.

== Biography ==
Marfa Stepanovna Sabinina was the daughter of the Russian archpriest Stefan Sabinin in Weimar in Saxony. She studied music with Georg and Clara Schumann, Peter Cornelius, and Franz Liszt, and worked as a music teacher at Weimar from 1854 to 1860. She received an appointment as court music teacher to the children of Tsar Alexander II in St. Petersburg, where she served from 1855 to 1881.

Von Sabinin worked at a hospital from 1876 to 1878 during the Russo-Turkish War and afterward entered a nunnery of the Tsarist Sisters of the Annunciation. She became an abbess, founded hospitals herself, and died in 1892 in the Crimea.

== Works ==
Selected works include:

- Das Fischermädchen, op. 1 (Acht Lieder) no. 6 (Text: Heinrich Heine)
- Das ist ein Brausen und Heulen, op. 1 (Acht Lieder) no. 7 (Text: Heinrich Heine)
- Ich hab' dich geliebt und liebe dich noch, op. 1 (Acht Lieder) no. 8 (Text: Heinrich Heine)
- An den heiligen Franziskus von Paula choral work, libretto, music by Franz Liszt
