= Lev Konov =

Russian composer

Lev Nikolaevich Konov (Russian: Лев Николаевич Конов; born 11 February 1952 in Moscow) is a Russian composer, conductor and producer. He graduated from Moscow Conservatory in 1980.

== Operas ==
- King Matt the First - the opera for/by children, the libretto is written on fairy tale by Janusz Korczak, the first execution: 1988 Russia, Moscow. Sound recording of an opera 1992.
- Asgard - the opera for/by children, libretto by Lev Konov, written on Prose Edda (Younger Edda) by Snorri Sturluson.

The first execution: 1994, Russia, Moscow. Olav Tryggvason, op.50 by Edvard Grieg is included in opera.

- Kokin Wakashū - opera for/by children, libretto by Lev Konov, the first execution: 1996, Russia, Moscow.
- The Ugly Duckling - Opera-Parable By Hans Christian Andersen For Mezzo-Soprano (Soprano), Three-part Children’s Choir And the Piano. 1 Act: 2 Epigraphs, 38 Theatrical Pictures Length: Approximately 26 minutes. The opera version (Free transcription) Written by Lev Konov (1996) On music of Sergei Prokofiev: “The Ugly Duckling”, op. 18 (1914) And “Visions Fugitives”, op. 22 (1915–1917)

(Vocal score language: Russian, English, German, French)
