= German Okunev =

Russian composer

German Grigoryevich Okunev (Russian: Ге́рман Григо́рьевич О́кунев; 12 June 1931, in Leningrad – 12 June 1973, in Leningrad) was a Soviet Russian composer, pianist and teacher.

== Life ==
Okunev's father was an engineer; his mother was a dressmaker. From the age of 8 he attended a musical school in Leningrad. He graduated from the Rimsky-Korsakov Conservatory in Leningrad, where he studied with O. Yevlakov and Boris Klyuzner, in 1956.

From 1957 to 1960 Okunev taught music at Frunze, (now Bishkek), in Kirghiz SSR. In 1964 he returned to the Rimsky-Korsakov Conservatory to study with Dmitri Shostakovich as a post-graduate pupil. Shostakovich had a high opinion of Okunev and later assisted him in obtaining performances for his works.

In 1968 Okunev narrowly escaped from drowning in an accident on Lake Ladoga. On 27 May 1973 Okunev and his wife were involved in a serious traffic accident from which Okunev died 17 days later, on his 42nd birthday.

After his death, an asteroid was named for him ('10990 Okunev') by its discoverer, N. S. Chernykh.

== Music ==
Okunev developed an individual style which became strongly, if indirectly, influenced by the music he became acquainted with in Kirghizia. His early three-act ballet 'Kuiruchuk' (1961) is based on Kirghiz themes.

His compositions include two symphonies, a variety of chamber music, concertos for the oboe and for two pianos, a trumpet sonatina and music written for children, including the suite 'Raduga' ('Rainbow'). An adagio and scherzo for trombone and piano have been recorded in Western Europe: other recordings of his music made during the Soviet period are not currently available.

Okunev's First Symphony (1962–1964) was written whilst studying with Shostakovich. It received its first performance in April 1966 in Irkutsk. His Second Symphony, a concise but effective and carefully crafted work, perhaps his greatest, was first performed in 1972 in Leningrad. Its second performance came only after his death, in 1974 in Yaroslavl.

At the time of his death Okunev was working on a ballet based on The Overcoat by Gogol; this was completed and orchestrated after his death by V. Sapozhnikov.
