= Igor Khudolei =

Russian composer and pianist

Igor Leonidovich Khudolei
- Born: 4 July 1940; Stalinabad
- Died: 11 July 2001 (aged 61)
- Occupations: Russian pianist, composer and Honored Artist of Russia

Igor Leonidovich Khudolei (also Khudoley) (4 July 1940, Stalinabad [modern Dushanbe] — 11 July 2001) was a Russian pianist, composer and Honored Artist of Russia.

He graduated from the Moscow Conservatory and post-graduate courses under Professor Yakov Flier (piano). Igor Khudolei attended the classes of Professor S. Balasanyan (composition). Khudolei was a laureate of several competitions - International Pianists (Lisbon, 1946), All-Union Pianists Competition (Kiev, 1970), and All-Union Composers Competition (Moscow, 1963).

== Compositions ==
- Concert Suite for Piano after Mussorgsky's opera Boris Godunov
- Transcription for piano of Night on Bald Mountain, by Mussorgsky

== Discography ==
- M. Mussorgsky:Pictures at an Exhibition, Igor Khudolei: Boris Godunov, suit; Igor Khudolei, piano; (Melodiya Record Company, USSR, 1990).
- Alfred Schnittke: Symphony No. 4; Three Sacred Hymns; Iarslav Zdorov, countertenor; Dmitri Pianov, tenor; Igor Khudolei, piano; Evgeniya Khlynova, celesta; Elena Adamovich, harpsichord; Russian State Symphonic Cappella and Russian State Symphony Orchestra conducted by Valery Polyansky (Chandos Records Ltd., 1996).
