= Irina Emeliantseva =

Russian musician

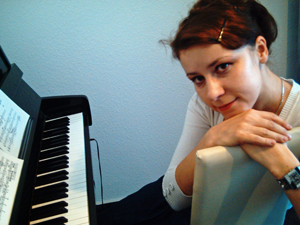
Irina Emeliantseva

Irina Emeliantseva (Russian: Ирина Емельянцева) (born 26 September 1973 in Seltso, Bryansk Oblast, Russia) is a Russian composer of orchestral works and chamber music in different cast and pianist.

== Biography ==
Throughout her career, she worked with the Dresden Symphony Orchestra, with the Russian Chamber Philharmonic St. Petersburg, the Castle Theater of the Rheinsberg Music Academy, the Philharmonic Orchestra of the State Theater Cottbus, the ensemble "Mosaik" Berlin, the Chamber Ensemble "New Music" Berlin, the trio "Boulange" and many other ensembles and performers together. Their orchestral works have been conducted by famous conductors such as Yuri Serebryakov (Юрий Серебряков), Jonathan Stockhammer, Evan Christ, Jürgen Bruns and others.

Irina Emeliantseva studied at a music college of the city of Bryansk at Mark Belodubrowski. Under the influence of the music of A. N. Scriabin and N.A. Roslavets she decided to devote herself to composition. She studied composition (with Prof. S. M. Slonimsky) and piano (Prof. N. Eismont) at the St. Petersburg Conservatory of Music, where she worked as an assistant after graduation. Further studies followed studies: at the Hochschule für Musik "Hanns Eisler" (Prof. Paul-Heinz Dittrich, graduated with honors) and at the University of Music "Carl Maria von Weber" Dr. E. H. Flammer.

She won numerous composition awards, among others the price of international competition Zwukowyje Puti in Saint Petersburg, the price of the Berlin Senate (color variations for chamber ensemble), the price of the Academy of Arts (Vega for orchestra), the price of the international competition for the space of the Transparent Factory in Dresden. In addition, they received numerous fellowships, stays (composer in residence at the Künstlerhof Schreyahn the Ministry of Culture of Niedersachsen, Castle Wiepersdorf etc.) and commissions (e.g. European Music Summer in Berlin, composition "light splitter" Apocalypse for the ensemble "New vocalist" Berlin) and many more.

Her compositions are performed regularly at numerous concerts and festivals. In addition, their music and their concert appearances are often sent to various radio channels.

As a musician Irina Emeliantseva is in demand internationally and considered one of the most pronounced profiled pianist of the current generation, particularly in the field of contemporary music. With numerous festivals and concerts played Irina Emeliantseva numerous premieres and Russian premieres of compositions by Dittrich, Messiaen, Roslavets, Lutoslawski, Humel and other, as well as her own works. She (last at Bayerischer Rundfunk in Munich) recorded several CDs. Her works have been postponed while Simon Verlag für Bibliothekwissen Berlin.

== Awards ==
- Gartow-Foundation Award for young composers in Germany (1995)
- Composer Award at the Sound Ways Festival in St Petersburg (1996)

== Discography ==
- Paul-Heinz Dittrich: Piano Music I - VII (with Frank Gutschmidtstraße). Edel, Hamburg 2001 (2 Compact Discs + booklet)
- Nikolai Andreyevich Roslawez: Piano Works. Neos, München 2009
- Irina Emeliantseva: Piano Works. Neos, Munich 2015

== Bibliography ==
- Ulrike Liedtke. Frau Musica heute: Konzepte für Kompositionen. Rheinsberg, 2005.
