= Mikhail Youdin =

Russian and Soviet composer (1893–1948)

Mikhail Youdin (29 September 1893 St. Petersburg – 8 February 1948 Kazan) was a Russian composer. He studied at Saint Petersburg Conservatory, where he began teaching in 1926, and is best remembered for his 1943 opera Farida.

Youdin earned the nickname "Russian Bach" because of his career spent composing large scale ensembles, oratorios and cantatas.
