= Yuri Yukechev =

Russian composer and music teacher (born 1947)

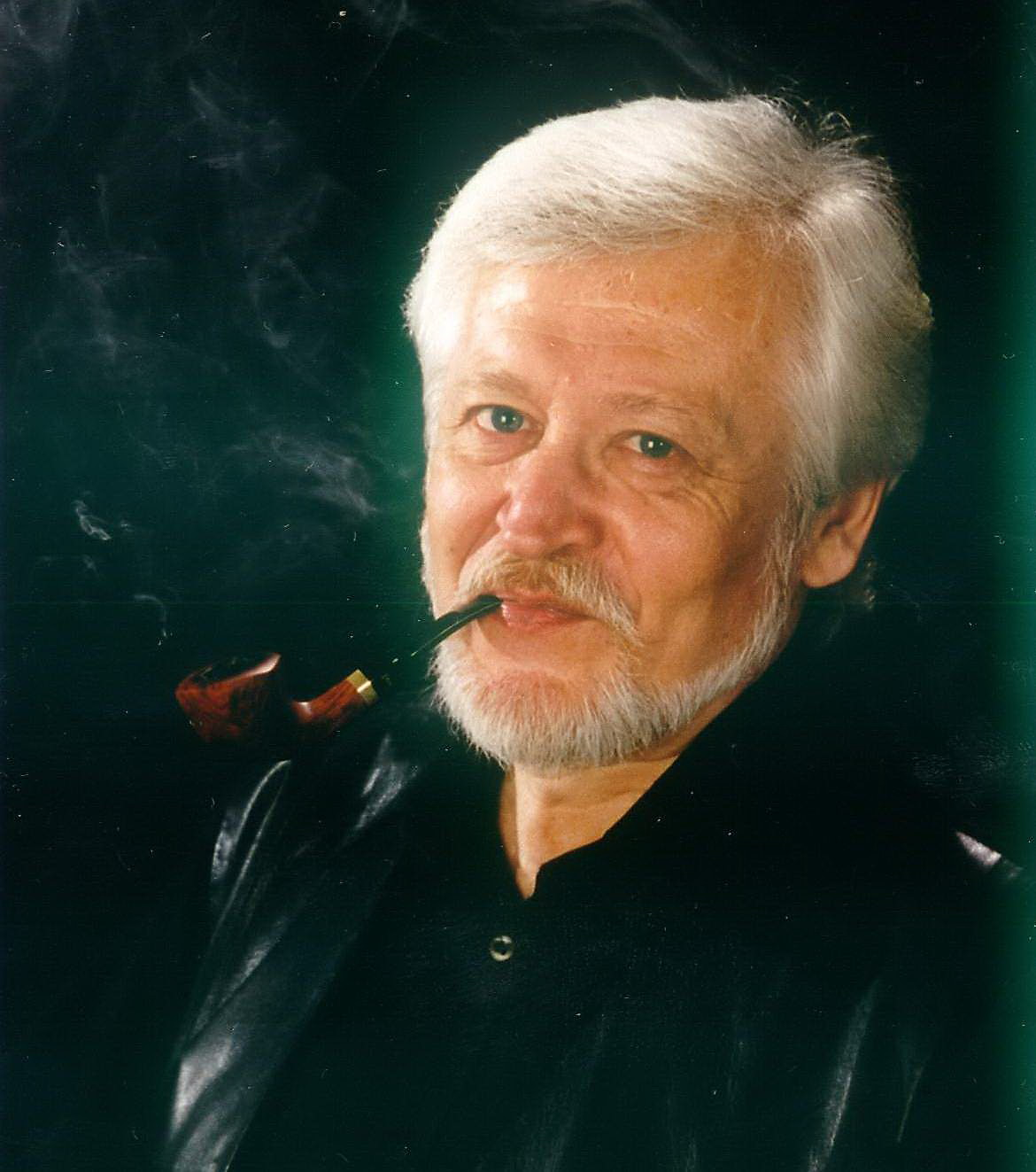

Yuri Pavlovich Yukechev (Russian: Ю́рий Па́влович Юке́чев, Yuriy Pavlovič Yukečev) (born 1 January 1947) is a Russian composer and music teacher.

== Biography ==
Yuri Yukechev was born in 1947 in Mukachevo, Ukraine. In 1965-1970 he studied composition at the St. Petersburg (Leningrad) Conservatoire with the famous in Russia teacher Orest Yevlakhov (pupil of Dmitri Shostakovich). Since 1970 he has been living and working in Novosibirsk where he is a professor of composition at the Novosibirsk State Conservatoire. Since 1996 he also holds a post of the chairman of Siberian Branch of Russian Composers Union.

Yuri Yukechev is an author of more than 300 works. There are three directions predominate in his music:

- Classical genres of chamber instrumental and choral music
- Improvisation music with a strong influence of free and avant-garde jazz
- Electronic music including audio-visual installations

As a teacher of composition Yuri Yukechev has taught many composers, musicologists, music teachers and other musicians currently working throughout Russia and abroad.

== Selected discography ==
«Siberian 4», Leo Records, UK
«Untitled», Leo Records, UK
«Document (Russia Jazz-80)», Leo Records, UK
«My Heart Is Ready», Hellicon Classics, USA
