= Alexander Rosenblatt =

Russian composer (born 1956)

Alexander Rosenblatt (Russian: Александр Розенблат, born 31 July 1956 in Moscow) is a Russian composer.

Rosenblatt studied piano and composing at the Moscow Conservatory from 1975 to 1982 with Pavel Messner and Karen Khachaturian. From 1983 to 1990 he gave lessons at the Gnessin Institute in Moscow. Since then he is working as a freelance composer and pianist. Rosenblatt has composed music for piano, cello, chamber orchestra and symphony orchestra. His compositions range from classical music to crossover and jazz.

== Works (selection) ==
- Paganini Variations, for piano (1988)
- Alice in Wonderland, suite for symphony orchestra (1992)
- Carmen Fantasy, for two pianos (1994)
- Swan Lake Suite-Fantasy after Peter Tchaikovsky, for piano (2008)
- Jazz Nutcracker for Piano
- Piano Sonata No.2 (1988)
