= Zhanneta Metallidi =

Soviet and Russian composer and music educator (1934–2019)

Zhanneta Lazarevna Metallidi (Russian: Жаннэ́та Ла́заревна Металли́ди; 1 June 1934 — 7 June 2019) was a Soviet and Russian composer and music educator.

== Biography ==
She was born in Leningrad, and studied with Galina Ustvol'skaya in Leningrad and with Orest Yevlakhov at the Leningrad Conservatory.

After completing her education, Metallidi worked at the Leningrad Drama Institute as an accompanist and began composing incidental music for plays. In 1960 she took a position teaching at a children's music school and began to compose in other genres.

== Death ==
She died on June 7, 2019, in St. Petersburg at the age of 85.

== Works ==
Metallidi composed for orchestra, chamber ensemble and chorus. She was noted for children's music. Selected works include:

- Songs of the Great Way for voice and piano, 1958 (Walt Whitman words)
- Romances, song cycle, 1973
- Siuita, 1975
- Smeyantsi, cantata for children's chorus, percussion, piano, 1981
- The Country, musical, 1989
- The Cockroach, opera, 1992
