= Lyudmila Lyadova =

Russian composer (1925–2021)

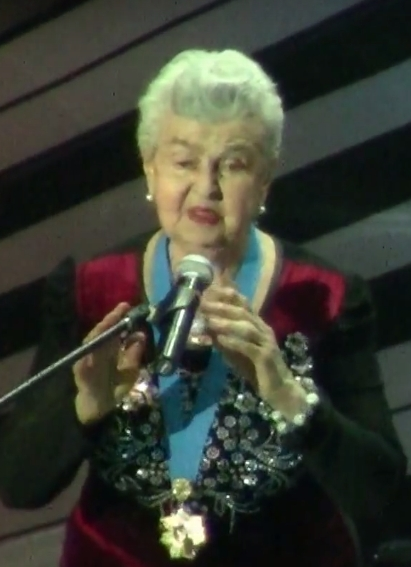
- Lyudmila Lyadova in 2015
- Born: Lyudmila Alekseevna Lyadova; 29 March 1925; Sverdlovsk, Russian SFSR, Soviet Union (modern Yekaterinburg, Russia)
- Died: 10 March 2021 (aged 95); Moscow, Russia
- Occupations: composer, singer
- Years active: 1948-2020

Lyudmila Alekseevna Lyadova (Russian: Людмила Алексеевна Лядова; 29 March 1925 – 10 March 2021) was a Russian composer who lived and worked in Moscow.

== Early life ==
Lyudmila Lyadova was born in Sverdlovsk (modern Yekaterinburg) into a family of professional musicians. Her father was Alexei Ivanovich Lyadov, a tenor soloist and violinist of the Sverdlovsk Opera Theatre, and her mother was Julia Petrovna Lyadova (1902-1980) who sang with the Sverdlovsk Philharmonic. Lyudmila took private piano lessons as a child, studying with Vanda Bernhard-Trzaska. At the age of 10, she entered the Sverdlovsk Conservatory where she studied with Bertha Marants and Victor Trambitsky. At the age of 14 she made her debut with the Sverdlovsk Philharmonic conducted by Mark Paverman.

== Early career ==
During World War II, Lyadova and her mother became active in concert brigades to entertain the troops, where Lyudmila played and sang popular songs. By November 1943, she had already written a children's miniature on poems by Agniya Barto and Petrovsky and other works including a piano sonata. She appeared in Moscow in a showcase for young talent, and two years later won a performance prize in Moscow for a duet with Nina Panteleeva. The duo went on to tour successfully and participated in variety shows and summer theater.

== Career ==
In February 1951 Lyadova was admitted to the Union of Soviet Composers, and soon afterward the duo broke up as she spent more time working as a composer. She collaborated with poet Georgy Hodosov to produce about one hundred songs, and also worked with poets Sergey Mikhalkov, Yevgeny Yevtushenko, Nikolay Dorizo, Lucia Zubkova, Boris Bryansky, Vladimir Petrov, Tamara Ponomareva and others.

== Family life ==
She was married to saxophonist Alexander Fedorovich Lyadov (née Kudryashov).

== Death ==
Lyadova was admitted to hospital with COVID-19 in June 2020, during the COVID-19 pandemic in Russia. She died from complications of the virus on 10 March 2021, nineteen days short of her 96th birthday.

== Honors and awards ==
- People's Artist of the USSR (1985) and the RSFSR
- Honored Art Worker of Russia (1975)
- State Prize of the USSR
- Russian State Prize named after Alexander Vasilyevich Alexandrov
- Lenin Komsomol Prize
- Order For Merit to the Fatherland 3rd class
- Order For Merit to the Fatherland 4th class
- Order of Honour
- Order of Friendship
- Medal "For Distinguished Labour"
- Medal "For the Development of Virgin Lands"
- Honorary citizen of the Sverdlovsk Oblast (2015)

== Works ==
Lyadova is noted for operettas and theater for children. Selected works include:

- Podem (1980)
- Two Colors of Time (1986)
- Under a black mask (1960)
- Atamansha (1972)
- In a dangerous level (1976)
- Who's your bride? (1978)
- Miner's Bride (1983)
- Soul Soldier (libretto by Eugene Shatunovsky, 1962),
- The Tale of Eremu, Daniel and evil forces (1977)
- A Countess from San Francisco (Izhevsk Academic Opera, 1993)
- The Great Battle (lyrics by Vladimir Petrov, 1967)
- Concert Waltz for piano, (1950)
- Carousel for piano, (1960)
- Concert Polka for piano, (1965)
- Concerto for Piano and Orchestra in A minor, (1965)
- Intermezzo, Rhapsody, for Russian Folk Instruments
- Kolkhoznaya Polka, (1950)
- Ural Rhapsody, (1951)
- Volga Suite, (1952)
- The Feast of the Volga for orchestra, (1957)
- Holiday in the stadium for orchestra, (1958)
- Russian souvenir for orchestra, (1961)
- Coconuts for orchestra, (1963)
- Elegy for violin and piano, (1961)
- Blind Girl for violin, (1962)
- Fantasy for accordion, (1962)
- Negro Doll, ballet
- Spanish Dance, ballet

Her music has been used in films, including:

- It's Impossible Without It, (1971)
- Giraffe and the Glasses, (1978)

Lyadova has also published a collection of nursery rhymes entitled Pochemuchka.
