= Yelena Konshina =

Russian composer and music educator (born 1950)

Yelena Sergeyevna Konshina (born 9 January 1950) is a Russian composer and music educator. She was born in Kirovgrad, Sverdlovsk (Yekaterinburg), and lives and works in Vladimir. Konshina is noted for a cappella choral works, but also composes for orchestra, chamber ensemble and piano. Her compositions are influenced by sacred works and Russian folk music.
