= Tatyana Sergeyeva =

Russian composer

Tat'yana Sergeyeva (born 1951) is a Russian composer.

== Biography ==
Tat'yana Pavlovna Sergeyeva was born in Tver, Russia. She studied music at the Moscow Conservatory and completed post-graduate work in composition, piano, and organ. Sergeyeva won the Shostakovich Composers' Prize in 1987 and became an Honored Artist of the Russian Federation in 1995. She is a member of the Russian Union of Composers.

== Works ==
Selected works include:

- Aria for Mezzo-Soprano and Piano, on a text by A.Sumarokov (1984)
- Aria for Mezzo-Soprano and Piano, on a text by I.Pisarev (1984)
- Black Rose, for bayan, piano, violin, cello, and percussion (2001)
- Concerto for violin, piano, harpsichord, and organ
- Daphne, trio for saxophone, cello, and organ
- Piano Concerto No.2
- Piano Concerto No.3 (2002)
- Serenade for Trombone and Organ (1995)
- Sonata for Violin and Organ (1994)
- Vocal Cycle for Mezzo-Soprano and Piano, on verses by ancient poets
- Vocal Cycle on Verses by Tatiana Cherednichenko

Her works have been recorded and issued on CD, including:

- Contemporary Russian Composers by Korupp (Audio CD - 1993)
- Musical World of Tatiana Sergeyeva by Tatyana Sergeyeva, Dmitry Liss, and Vladimir Tinkha (Audio CD - 2000)
