= Katerina Maier =

Russian composer

Katerina Maier-Schiatti (fl. c. 1800) was a Russian composer, the daughter of violinist and composer Luigi Schiatti who lived in Russia from 1760 and played in the court orchestra. She published a set of three piano sonatas dedicated to Count Platon Zubov in St. Petersburg and a piano concerto in London around 1800.
