= Pavel Petrovich Bulakhov =

Russian composer

Pavel Petrovich Bulakhov (Russian: Павел Петрович Булахов; 1824–1875) was a Russian composer, and brother of Pyotr Bulakhov. He gained fame in the Russian Empire as a tenor at the Imperial Opera in St. Petersburg and trained at the Theatre School.

He debuted in 1850 as Sobinin in A Life for the Tsar, followed by the role of Joseph in Méhul’s Joseph. Both performances were well received. Known for his soft and graceful lyric tenor (tenore di grazia), he had a successful operatic career spanning over 20 years.

Among his notable roles were Lorenzo (Fra Diavolo), Baskari (La muette de Portici), Rimbaud (Robert le Diable), Finn (Ruslan and Lyudmila), Campobasso (Charles the Bold), and the Fool (Rogneda).

Pavel Bulakhov died on October 15, 1875, in St. Petersburg.
