= Adrian Shaposhnikov =

Russian composer

Adrian Grigoryevich Shaposhnikov, (Russian: Адриан Григорьевич Шапошников; 1888 – 1967) was both a Soviet classical music composer and a People's Artist of the Turkmen Soviet Socialist Republic. His style is similar to Alexander Gretchaninov's. His only familiar work is his Sonata for Flute and Harp, which has been recorded several times.
