= Cadena =

Cadena is a surname. Notable people with the surname include:

- Ana Lilia Garza Cadena (born 1970), Mexican politician
- Carlos Cadena (1917–2001), Mexican American lawyer, civil rights activist and judge
- Carlos Cadena Gaitan (born 1983), journalist and affiliated researcher with the United Nations University
- Daniel Cadena (born 1987), Spanish footballer
- Dez Cadena (born 1961), American punk rock singer and guitarist
- Edgar Cadena (born 2000), Mexican track and road cyclist
- Eva Cadena, Mexican politician from Veracruz
- Francisco Páez de la Cadena (born 1951), Spanish garden historian
- Freddy Cadena (born 1963), Ecuadorian orchestra conductor
- José Torres Cadena (born 1952), former football (soccer) referee from Colombia
- Julio César Cadena (born 1963), Colombian former racing cyclist
- Lloyd Cadena (1993–2020), Filipino vlogger, radio personality, and author
- Mabel Cadena (born 1990), Mexican actress
- Manuel Cadena Morales (born 1948), Mexican politician
- Mariano Velazquez de la Cadena (1778–1860), Mexican American grammarian, scholar and author
- Oscar Cadena (1945–2021), Mexican journalist, television host, and environmentalist
- Ozzie Cadena (1924–2008), American record producer
- Ricardo Cadena (born 1969), Mexican retired footballer
- Rodolfo Cadena (1943–1972), Mexican-American mob boss and member of the Mexican Mafia prison gang
- Rodrigo de la Cadena (born 1988), Mexican singer, performer, songwriter, radio host and musician
- Tony Cadena, a stage name of punk rock singer/songwriter and poet Anthony Brandenburg (born 1963)

== See also ==
- Cadena (comics), a Marvel Comics character
- Cadena (company), a technology and services company
- Lacadena (disambiguation)
