= Cadena (disambiguation) =

Cadena is a surname.

Cadena or variation, may also refer to:

- Cadena (τὰ Κάδηνα), a city in ancient Cappadocia that also had the royal palace of Sisines
- La Cadena, a mountain in the Province of Málaga in southern Spain
- Estero La Cadena, a river in Chile
- Cadena (comics), a Marvel Comics character
- Cadena 94.9 (Spanish: 94.9 Network), an Argentine radio station broadcasting from the city of Pilar, Buenos Aires
- Cadena Cafes Limited, a chain of cafes in southern England from the 1890s to the 1970s
- Grupo Cadena, a media company based in Tijuana, Baja California, Mexico
- Cadena COPE, a private, right wing, commercial Spanish radio network owned by a series of institutions within the Spanish Catholic Church
- Cadena Dial, a Spanish radio station based in Seville
- Cadena Melodía, a Colombian radio network, founded in 1971 by liberal politician Efraín Páez Espitia
- Cadena SER (the SER Network), Spain's premier radio network in terms of both seniority
- Cadena Súper, a Colombian radio network, founded in the 1970s by Conservative politician Jaime Pava Navarro
- Cadena temporal and cadena perpetua, punishments in the Philippine legal system

== See also ==
- Cadena braga, an American telenovela created and produced by Telemundo 1991
- Cadena Capriles, a Venezuelan media company that owns the newspapers Últimas Noticias and El Mundo
- Cadena Salsoul, an entertainment-based salsa radio station in Puerto Rico
- Lacadena (disambiguation)
