= Elena Kuschnerova =

Russian pianist (born 1959)

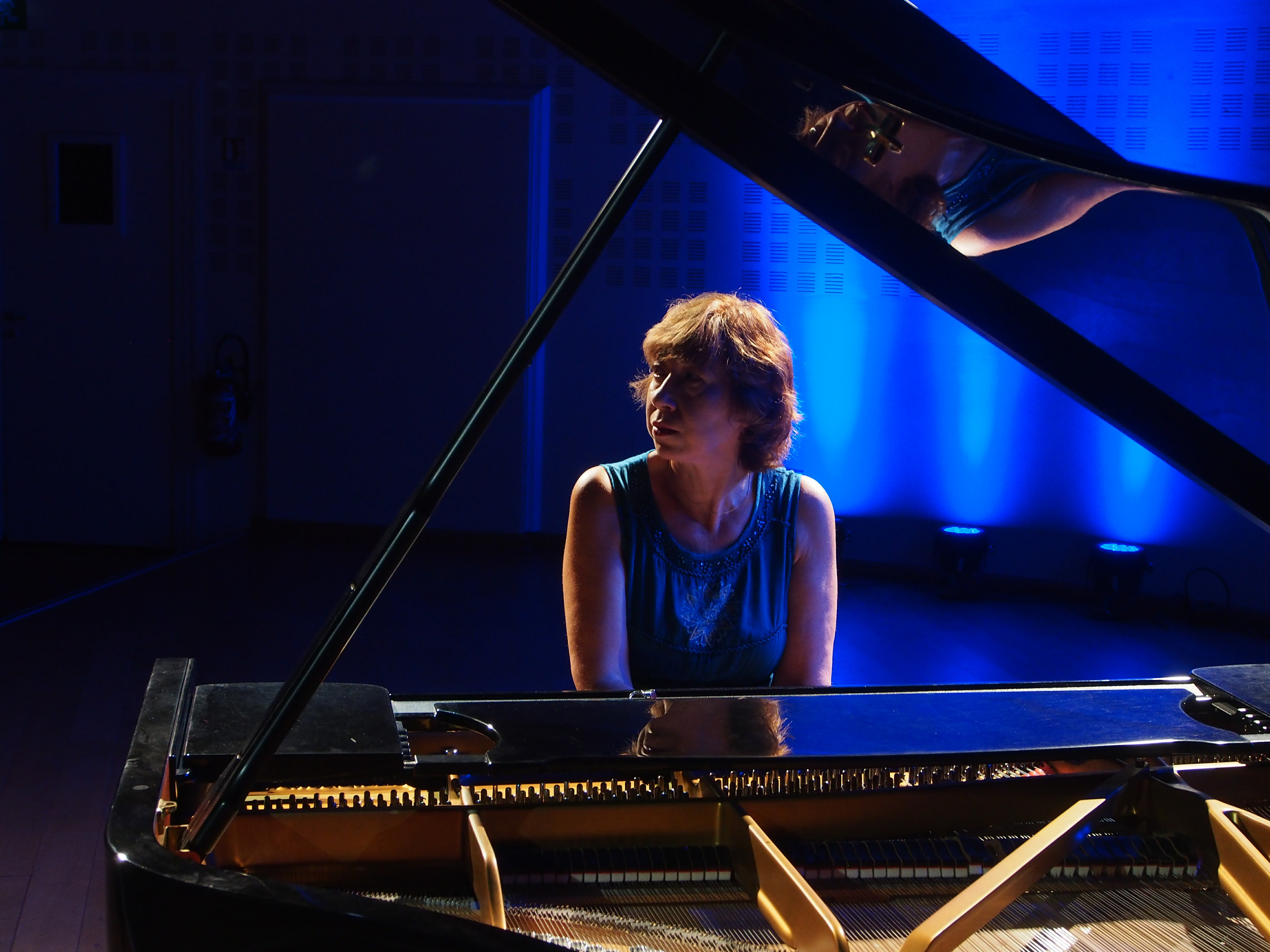
- Kuschnerova in 2014

Background information
- Born: January 6, 1959 (age 67); Moscow, Russia
- Genres: Classical
- Occupation: Pianist
- Instrument: Piano

Elena Kuschnerova (Russian: Еле́на Ефи́мовна Кушнеро́ва, romanized: Yelena Yefimovna Kushnerova; born 6 January 1959 in Moscow) is a Russian-born classical pianist.

== Biography ==
Elena Kuschnerova was born into a musical family in Moscow. She began her piano education at the age of five with her mother. At seven, she became a student of Tatyana Kestner at the Moscow Central Music School. At the age of nine, Kuschnerova made her first appearance with orchestra conducted by Aram Khachaturian playing Bach's Keyboard Concerto No. 5 in F minor, which was recorded by Radio Moscow. Upon graduation she studied at the Moscow Conservatory with Sergei Dorensky. After receiving her diploma (with honors) in 1982, she went on tour in the Soviet Union for the next eight years. Foreign appearances and participation in international competitions were not allowed by Soviet authorities.

In 1992 Kuschnerova emigrated to Germany and started a new career there. In the following years, she earned international acclaim giving concerts in Western Europe, USA and Japan. As a piano professor she taught master classes in Germany, Japan, South Korea, Sweden, and the USA. Since 2006 she has been guest professor at the Elisabeth University of Music in Hiroshima. Kuschnerova lives nowadays in Baden-Baden and in New York.

== Music ==
Several composers have written piano works for Kuschnerova, who also premiered most of them.

- During her time as a student in Moscow, Kuschnerova was influenced by the composer Alexander Lokshin. In 1982 he dedicated a piano cycle "Prelude and Theme with Variations" to her. She premiered it the same year;
- Siegfried Matthus, "Die Sehnsucht nach der verlorenen Melodie" ("Longing for the lost tune"), piano concerto. First performance by Elena Kuschnerova 2002 in Dresden with Dresden Philharmonic orchestra, conductor Marek Janowski;
- Mikhail Kollontay, piano concerto op. 45. First performance by Elena Kuschnerova 2011 in the Grand Hall of the Moscow Conservatory, conductor Freddy Cadena;
- Mikhail Kollontay, Seven Romantic Ballads, op. 2bis.

Harold Schonberg, the former chief music critic for The New York Times, wrote about Kuschnerova's "Scriabin - 12 Études, Op. 8, 24 Preludes, Op. 11, 2 Poèmes, Op. 32" CD in the American Record Guide: "These are the best recorded performances I am familiar with".

Jürgen Otten names Kuschnerova in Die großen Pianisten der Gegenwart (The Great Pianists of Modern Times) together with Elisabeth Leonskaja and Lilya Zilberstein as the three most notable Russian female pianists. He acknowledges her "flawless technique" and "enormous tonal wisardry" and calls her "pianist par excellence".

Kuschnerova is a Steinway Artist since 2001.

== Selected recordings ==
- Peter Tschaikowsky, Robert Schumann, Frédéric Chopin, Gounod–Liszt, Claude Debussy, Sergei Prokofiev. Bella Musica, 1996
- Sergei Prokofiev - Romeo & Juliet, Ten Pieces for Piano, Op. 75, Piano Sonata No. 2 in D Minor, Op. 14, March from the Opera The Love for Three Oranges, Op. 33. Ars Musici (GER), 1997
- Alexander Scriabin - 12 Études, Op. 8, 24 Preludes, Op. 11, 2 Poèmes, Op. 32. Ars Musici, 2000
- Johann Sebastian Bach - Italian concerto, BWV 971, French Suite No. 2 in C minor, BWV 813, Toccata in E minor, BWV 914, Partita No. 6, BWV 830, Prelude and Fugue in C minor, BWV 871, from The Well-Tempered Clavier. Orfeo, 2001
- Modest Mussorgsky - Pictures at an Exhibition, Piano pieces. Orfeo, 2002
- Live in Tokyo (Domenico Scarlatti, Claude Debussy, Maurice Ravel, Sergei Prokofiev, Bach–Siloti). Steinway Japan, 2002
- Igor Stravinsky - Piano works. Ars Produktion, 2005
- Johannes Brahms - Piano pieces, Op. 116–119. Ars Produktion, 2005
- Johannes Brahms - Four Ballads, Op. 10. Mikhail Kollontay - Romantic Ballads, Op. 2bis. Ars Produktion, 2008
- Frédéric Chopin - Piano concertos Nos. 1 & 2 (arr. chamber ensemble). Major, 2010
- Frédéric Chopin - Piano concertos Nos. 1 & 2. Major, 2010.
- Robert Schumann - Faschingsschwank aus Wien, Op. 26, Beethoven Études, WoO 31, Variations on the name "Abegg", Op. 1, Fantasiestücke, Op. 12. Glor, 2011
- Robert Schumann - Carnaval, Op.9, Symphonic Études, Op. 13. Glor, 2012
- Mikhail Kollontay - Piano Concerto No. 2, Op. 45. Sergei Prokofiev - Piano Concerto No. 4, Op. 53. Moscow Radio, 2015
- Johann Sebastian Bach - Well-Tempered Clavier, Book I. Major, 2015
