= Cadenas =

Cadenas is a Spanish surname. It is the surname of:

- Manolo Cadenas (born 1955), Spanish handball coach
- Margarita Cadenas, Venezuelan-French director, producer and screenwriter
- Rafael Cadenas (born 1930), Venezuelan poet and essayist

== See also ==
- Cadena, another surname
- Cárdenas
- Cadena nacional, a type of broadcast in Latin America
