= Irina Lozovaya =

Soviet and Russian musicologist

- Ирина Евгеньевна Лозовая
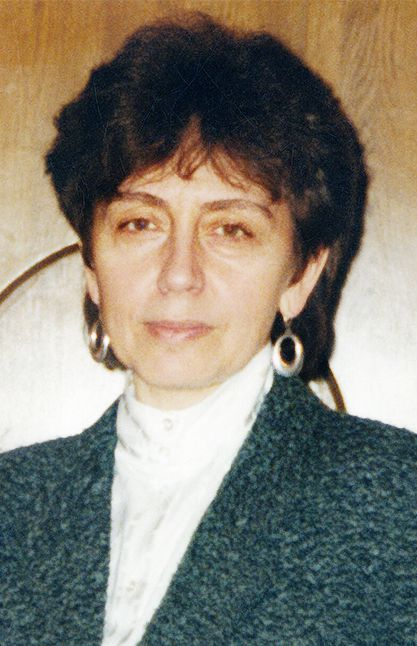
- Born: 5 February 1950; Moscow, Russian SFSR, Soviet Union
- Died: 9 June 2017 (aged 67); Moscow, Russian Federation
- Citizenship: Soviet Union, Russian Federation
- Education: Moscow Conservatory
- Known for: specialist in the early Eastern Christian art of chant
- Spouse: Mikhail Kollontay
- Scientific career
- Fields: musicology
- Workplaces: Moscow Conservatory
- Thesis: Original Traits of the Stolpovoy Znamenny Chant (Самобытные черты знаменного распева)) (1987)
- Doctoral advisor: Valentina Kholopova

Irina Yevgenyevna Lozovaya (Russian: Ири́на Евге́ньевна Лозова́я; 5 February 1950 – 9 July 2017) Soviet and Russian musicologist, teacher, Professor at the Moscow State Tchaikovsky Conservatory. Her main sphere of academic research was Early Russian and Byzantine chant.

== Biography ==
Born in Moscow to the family of the military engineer Evgeny Fyodorovitch Lozovoy. Music study started while a child. In 1971 she finished the course in music theory at the Moscow Music College linked with the Moscow Conservatory, gaining a diploma with distinction. The same year she entered the Conservatory in the department of theory and composition. Since 1973, influenced by her husband Mikhail Kollontay, she started research on the early Russian chant tradition. In 1976 she graduated from the conservatory and started postgraduate studies under the tutorship of Valentina Kholopova, completing them in 1981. She submitted her PhD thesis Original Traits of the Stolpovoy Znamenny Chant (defended in Kiev, 1987).

She worked as a scholarly editor for the publishing houses Sovetskaya Encyclopedia (1976-1989) and Kompozitor (1990–1993), and was also a lecturer at the St.-Tikhon Theological Orthodox Institute (now Saint Tikhon's Orthodox University) (1992–1997).

From 1993 onwards she worked at the Department of the History of Russian Music of the Moscow Conservatory (from 2000 as a professor).

In 1995 she became the head of the Rev. Dimitry Razumovsky Scholarly Centre for Russian Church Music within the Department of the History of Russian Music, which in September 2017 was transformed into the Scholarly Creative Centre of Church Music. During this period she organised at the conservatory five international scholarly conferences and was editor-in-chief of their proceedings titled “Hymnology” (7 issues, 2000–2017). She organised the section “Byzantium and Old Rus’: Liturgical and Chant Traditions” at the international scholarly theological conference “Russia and Athos: A Millennium of Spiritual Unity” (2006).

She created and ran (from 1994) a special course of lectures on “The History of Russian Music of the 11th to 17th Centuries”. She also initiated additional faculty courses that developed and deepened the main sphere of her scholarly activity. Among them were: “The practical study of znamenny chant based on the living tradition”, “Musical palaeography”, “Greek palaeography”, “Slavic palaeography,” “An introduction to Byzantine and early Russian art” and “Znamenny chant”. To enhance the liturgical and general cultural horizon of the students she initiated a course on the “History of Eastern Orthodox worship”, which still continues.

From 1998 she collaborated with the Orthodox Encyclopedia ecclesiastical scholarly centre as a member of the editorial board and curator of the “Worship and Church music” department (since 2004 an independent department of “Church music”); she was the author of a number of entries on early Russian and Byzantine church music. Under her tutorship two PhD theses were submitted, one by Olga Tiurina (“Early Russian Melismatic Chant: the Great Chant”, 2011) and the other by Irina Starikova (“The Psalmody of the Vigils in Early Russian Chant Art”, 2013).

In 2004/2005 Irina Lozovaya was the co-founder with Anna Yeliseyeva of the Asmatikon ensemble, which specialises on performing early Russian and Byzantine liturgical chants.

She was a member of the editorial board of the Moscow conservatory and influenced the publishing policy of the conservatory with regard to early Russian chant.

== Research Activity ==
She was the author of numerous articles and entries on the problems of the history and theory of Eastern Christian liturgical chant art in various anthologies of articles and encyclopedias including Musical Encyclopedia (Музыкальная энциклопедия, 1973–1982), Musical Encyclopedic Dictionary (Музыкальный энциклопедический словарь, 1990), Die Musik in Geschichte und Gegenwart, New Grove Dictionary of Music and Musicians (2nd edition, Vol. 29, 2004), Orthodox Encyclopedia (2000-2017).

Characteristic of Lozovaya's work is her comprehensive approach to studying the liturgical chant books. The main task of their investigation, in her opinion, requires a combination of the methods of both historical and theoretical musicology and therefore presupposes a good knowledge of historical liturgiology, palaeography and codicology.

Important for Lozovaya's scholarly method was a consideration of early Russian music within the historical “Byzantine” perspective:

Without having enough information on the Byzantine chant culture many things in early Russian chant culture cannot be understood, as its roots originate in that great musical liturgical tradition. The Typikon, the system of chants and their texts, the Oktoechos system, as well as principles of the structure of the melodies and methods of notation were all brought to Rus’ from Byzantium and were adapted with the help of Byzantine priests and chanters.

The book Paraklete on early Russian chant (in the Russian State Archive of the Early Acts, abbreviated as RGADA, f. 381 (Syn. Typ.), No. 80) became the main subject of her scholarly research. The investigation resulted in a monograph “Early Russian Notated Paraklete of the 12th Century: Byzantine Sources and the Typology of the Early Russian Copies” (Moscow, 2009). This monograph was intended to be as the first part of a larger piece of research. However, the second part, in which Lozovaya hoped to “propose the study of the problems of the early forms of znamenny notation” was never completed.

There are many other items of her academic and methodological writing (including didactic tables and illustrative materials for the special course on the history of Russian music) which are preserved in her archive but remain unpublished.

== Awards ==
- Order of St. Olga, Princess of Kiev; Third Class (2007)
- Honorary Certificate of the Ministry of Culture of the Russian Federation (2011) for a valuable contribution to the development of culture

== Selected Works in Russian ==
Lozovaya's PhD thesis and many of her publications are available on the Academia.edu.

=== Books ===
- Early Russian Notated Parakletike of the 12th Century. The Byzantine Sources and Typology of the Early Russian Manuscript Copies (in Russian). Moscow: Moscow Conservatory Press. 2009. ISBN 978-5-89598-232-7.
- Stolpovoy Znamenny Rospev (Second Half of the 15th-17th Centuries): Formulaic Structure (Textbook) (in Russian). Moscow: Moscow Conservatory Press. 2015. ISBN 978-5-89598-307-2.

=== Articles ===
- (1982) “On the Form Making Principles of the European Monody: Byzantine, Gregorian and Early Russian Chant Cultures.” From the History of the Forms and Genres of Vocal Music. Moscow Conservatory Press: 3–21.
- (1986) “Znamenny Rospev and Russian Folklore Song (On the Original Traits of Stolpovoy Znamenny Chant.” Russian Choral Music of the 16th-18th Centuries. Transactions of the Gnessin State Music Pedagogical Institute. Issue 83. Moscow, Gnessin Institute Press: 26–45.
- (1988) “‘Angel-voiced Singing’ and Octoechos as the Most Important Aspect of its Musical Iconography.” Musica Antiqua VIII. Acta Musicologica. Vol. 1. Bydgoszcz, Philharmonia Pomorska Press: 649–666.
- (1989) “ ‘The Intertwining the Word of Sweet Chanting from the Words’ [of Poetry].” Hermeneutics of the Early Russian Literature: 16th – Beginning of the 18th Centuries. Issue 2. Moscow, Russian Academy of Sciences, Gorky Institute of World Literature Press: 383-422.
- (1992) “Russian Octoechos of the Znamenny Chant as an Original Mode System.” Musical Culture of the Middle Ages. Issue 2. Moscow, Central Museum of Musical Culture Press: 65–69.
- (1993) “Early Russian Notated Parakletike from the end of the 12th – beginning of the 13th centuries: Preliminary Notes to the Study of the Early Chant Book.” Hermeneutics of Early Russian Literature: 16th – Beginning of the 18th Centuries. Issue 6. Moscow, Russian Academy of Sciences, Gorky Institute of World Literature Press: 407–433.
- (1994) “The Problems of Chanting the Canon in the Pre-Mongolian Era of Rus’ ”. Musical Culture of the Orthodox World. Traditions, Theory, Practice. Transactions of the 1991–1994 International Scholarly Conferences. Moscow, Russian Music Academy Press: 79-90.
- (1996) “The Art of Chant in the 11th to the 16th Centuries.” The Artistic and Aesthetic Culture of Old Rus. 11th-17th Centuries. Moscow, “Ladomir” Publishing House: 267–299.
- (1996) “The Art of Chant of the 17th Century. The Traditional Trend.” Artistic and Aesthetic Culture of Old Rus. 11th-17th Centuries. Moscow, “Ladomir” Publishing House: 490–503.
- (1999) “Byzantine Prototypes of Early Russian Chant Terminology.” Collection of Articles In Memoriam Yury Keldysh. Moscow, Russian Academy of Sciences, Institute of Arts Press, 62–72.
- (2000) “Early Russian Notated Parakletike in the Circle of the 12th – First Half of the 15th-century Heirmologia: Melodic Variants and Versions in the Chant of the Canons.” Hymnology: In Memoriam Reverend Father Dimitry Razumovsky / Proceedings of the International Conference at the Moscow Tchaikovsky Conservatory. Issue 1. Moscow Conservatory Press: 217–239.
- (2002) “Images and Symbols of Early Russian Chant. Melopeia Canons and ‘Hexaemeron’.” From the history of Russian Musical Culture / In Memoriam Alexey Kandinsky. Transactions of the Moscow Conservatory. Issue 35. Moscow Conservatory Press: 31-47.
- (2003) “The Khludov Greek Psalter as a Source of Studying Byzantine Chant Tradition of the 9th Century. Manrusum. Problems of the History, Theory and Aesthetics of Sacred Music. International Musicological Review, Vol. 1. Yerevan: 159–175.
- (2003) “On the Origin of Chludov Psalter.” Early Russian Art. The Art of Manuscript Book Writing. Byzantium and Old Rus’ (co-authored with Boris Fonkich). St. Petersburg, “Dmitry Bulanin” Press: 7-20.
- (2003) “The Typology of Early Russian Parakletike and Their Relation to the Contemporary Liturgical Typikon.” Hymnology: Chant in its Historical and Liturgical Context. East – Rus’ – West / Proceedings of the International Conference Moscow Tchaikovsky Conservatory. Issue 3. Moscow Conservatory Press: 64–73.
- (2002) “On the Chanting System of the Weekly Oktoechos Canons in the Early Liturgical Tradition.” Hymnology: Byzantium and Eastern Europe. Liturgical and Musical Connections / 80th Birthday Festschrift for Dr Miloš Velimirovič. Issue 4. Moscow Conservatory Press: 52–68.
- (2008) “On the Evidence of Oral Chant Practice in the Written Sources.” Hymnology 5: Oral and Written Transmission of the Chant Tradition. East – Rus’ – West / Proceedings of the International Conference at the Moscow Tchaikovsky Conservatory. Issue 1. Moscow Conservatory Press: 133–144.
- (2009) “The ‘New Octoechos’ of St. Joseph the Hymnographer [Grottaferrata D.g. XIV] and Its Reflections in the Early Russian Parakletike of the Studios Tradition.” Chrysograph. Medieval Book Centres: Local Traditions and Inter-regional Connections. Proceedings of the International Scholarly Conference. Issue 3. Moscow, “Scanrus” Press, 190–203.
- (2011) “The Modal Complex of the Anaphora Chant Texts and the System of Octoechos.” Current Problems in Studying the Art of Chant: Theory and Practice. Proceedings of the International Conference at the Moscow Tchaikovsky Conservatory. Issue 6. Moscow Conservatory Press: 330–343.
- (2011) “On the contents of the Notions of Echos and Mode within the Context of the Theory of the Early Russian Monody.” Current Problems in Studying the Art of Chant: Theory and Practice. Proceedings of the International Conference at the Moscow Tchaikovsky Conservatory. Issue 6. Moscow Conservatory Press: 344–359.
- (2017) “On the Azbuka Sense of the Neumes and Their ‘Hidden’ Meanings in the Early Russian Chant Tradition.” Hymnology. Musical Written Language of the Christian World. Books. Notation. Problems of Interpretation / Proceedings of the International Conference, 12–17 May 2014 at the Moscow Tchaikovsky Conservatory. Issue 7. Moscow Conservatory Press: 264–283.

=== Encyclopedia Articles ===
- “Echos in Byzantine and Early Russian Chant.” Orthodox Encyclopedia. Vol. 11. Moscow, 2006, pp. 551–553.
- “Znamenny Notation”. Orthodox Encyclopedia. Vol. 20. Moscow, 2009, pp. 278–285.
- “Znamenny Chant”. Orthodox Encyclopedia. Vol. 20. Moscow, 2009, pp. 285–297.
