= Ángeles Cruz =

Mexican actress, film director and screenwriter

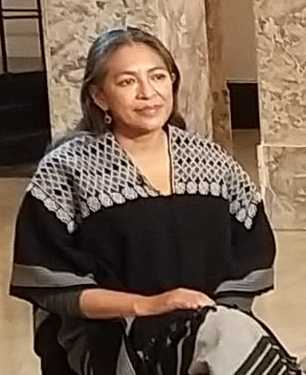
- At the 4th Women's Film Festival in 2021
- Born: 1969 (age 56–57); Villa Guadalupe Victoria, San Miguel el Grande, Oaxaca, Mexico
- Education: Instituto Nacional de Bellas Artes y Literatura
- Occupations: Actress, director, screenwriter
- Awards: Ariel Award (2013, 2019, 2022)

Ángeles Cruz (born 1969) is a Mexican actress, film director, and screenwriter. As a filmmaker, she has focused on themes of ostracism, female sexuality, and gender violence. In a 2022 interview, she explained, "I have three imbalances: I come from an indigenous community, I am a woman, and I am a lesbian – things that have been stereotyped and placed in an emerging situation of survival." Her work has been recognized with four Ariel Awards.

== Biography ==
Ángeles Cruz is originally from Villa Guadalupe Victoria in San Miguel el Grande, a mostly indigenous community high in the mountains of Oaxaca. She grew up primarily speaking Spanish, but learned some Mixtec from her father. In her community there was no electricity, no water, and no cinema. She saw only one film in her first sixteen years, El joven Juárez, which her father had in 16 mm. "When I saw the film for the first time in a cinema, it changed me, transformed me; it totally pulled out the rug," she recalled.

She wanted to be an agronomist and dedicate herself to farming, but her family had to relocate, first to Tlaxiaco, and later to Oaxaca. There, she switched to studying theater, a decision she credits to her high school teacher Sergio Santamaría.

Cruz studied at the Miguel Cabrera Center of Artistic Education in Oaxaca, and later completed a licentiate in acting at the INBA Theater Art School in Mexico City.

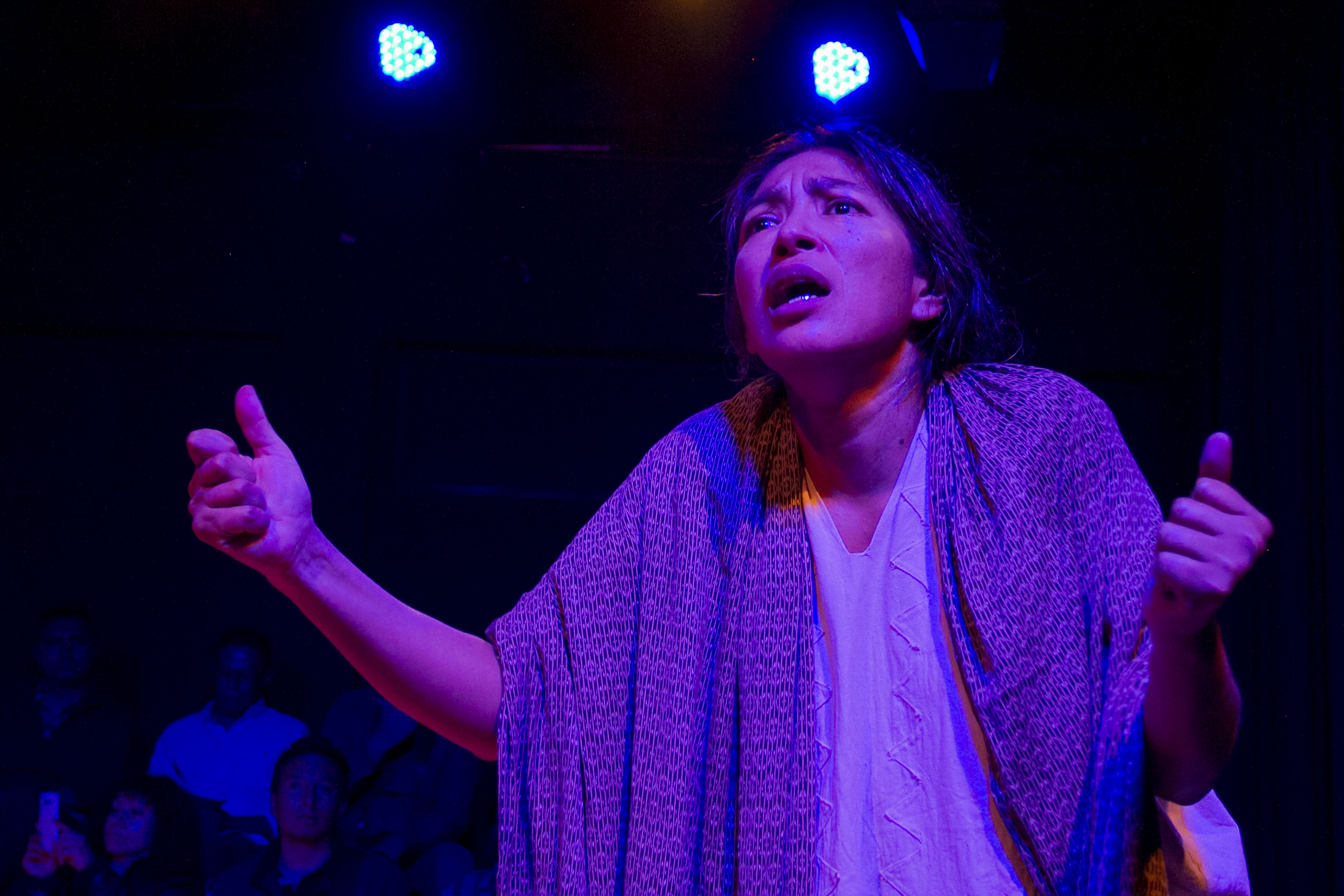
In the play El árbol (2016)

In 1994, she began getting roles in cinema. Her first film as an actress was the Swedish-Danish drama La hija del puma about massacres that occurred in Guatemala against the indigenous people. Her performance was nominated for the Guldbagge Award for Best Actress in a Leading Role.

In 2011, Cruz started writing her own stories, and directed a short film made from one such script, La tiricia o cómo curar la tristeza. It was produced by the Instituto Mexicano de Cinematografía, and won the Ariel Award for Best Short Film in 2013.

She continued with the shorts La carta and Arcángel, followed by her first feature, Nudo Mixteco, starring Sonia Couoh and Noé Hernández, which tells three stories of women living in indigenous communities in Oaxaca. Regarding the film's explicit love scenes between women, Cruz said,

Homosexuality has been crossed out in the world due to ignorance and due to this impasse that exists. For me it was important to name it and show it forcefully, not leave it to the imagination, not self-censor and let it remain in the line of imagination for the viewer to complete. I feel that it is a beautiful manifestation of love, and I feel that lesbian women in the communities have also remained in the dark, marginalized. Male homosexuality is named, everything from the male gaze. It seemed important to me to name it.

== Filmography ==
=== Films as director ===
- La tiricia o cómo curar la tristeza - short, 2012
- La carta - short, 2014
- Arcángel - short, 2018
- Nudo Mixteco - 2021
- Valentina or the Serenity - 2023

=== Films as actress ===
Year	Title	Role	Director
1994	La hija del puma	Aschlop	Åsa Faringer and Ulf Hultberg
1998	The Other Conquest	Doncella	Salvador Carrasco
2000	Rito terminal	Celia	Óscar Urrutia Lazo
2002	Aro Tolbukhin: In the Mind of a Killer		Agustí Villaronga
2005	The Violin	Jefa Guerrilera 1	Francisco Vargas
2008	Espiral	Araceli 2	Jorge Pérez Solano
2010	Marcelino, pan y vino	Petra	José Luis Gutiérrez Arias
2011	Cenizas Eternas	Matiri	Margarita Cadenas
2012	The Girl	Rosa's mother	David Riker
2016	Tamara y la catarina	Tamara	Lucía Carreras
2018	Dos Fridas	Adelita	Ishtar Yasin Gutiérrez
2018	Tiempo de lluvia	Soledad	Itandehui Jansen
2018	Traición		Ignacio Ortiz
2019	La ira o el seol		Juan Mora Catlett
2023	Familia	Teresa	Rodrigo García
2025	The Follies	Irlanda	Rodrigo García

=== TV series as actress ===
Year	Title	Role	Channel
2001–2005	Lo que callamos las mujeres	Rosa, Tomasa	Azteca Uno
2008	Capadocia	Fernanda Castrejón	HBO
2017	El Chapo	Evelina	Univision
2018	Malinche	Macti	Canal Once
2018–2020	Here on Earth	Jacobina	Fox Premium
2024	Como agua para Chocolate	Nacha	HBO

== Awards and nominations ==
Year	Award	Category	Work	Result	Ref.
2000	Ariel Award	Best Supporting Actress	Rito terminal	Nominated	
2013	Ariel Award	Best Fiction Short	La tiricia o cómo curar la tristeza	Won	
2014	Guldbagge Award	Best Actress in a Leading Role	La hija del puma	Nominated	
2015	Ariel Award	Best Fiction Short	La carta	Nominated	
2017	Silver Columbus from the Huelva Ibero-American Film Festival	Best Actress	Tamara y la catarina	Won	
2019	Ariel Award	Best Fiction Short	Arcángel	Won	
2019	Jury Film Award from the Cinequest Film & Creativity Festival	Best Narrative Short Film: Drama	Arcángel	Won	
2019	Coral Prize from the Havana Film Festival	Best Fiction Short	Arcángel	Won	
2022	Ariel Award	Best First Work	Nudo Mixteco	Won	
2022	Ariel Award	Best Picture	Nudo Mixteco	Nominated	
2022	Canvas Award from the MOOOV Filmfestival	Best Picture	Nudo Mixteco	Won	
