= Tatyana Apraksina =

Russian artist, writer, poet

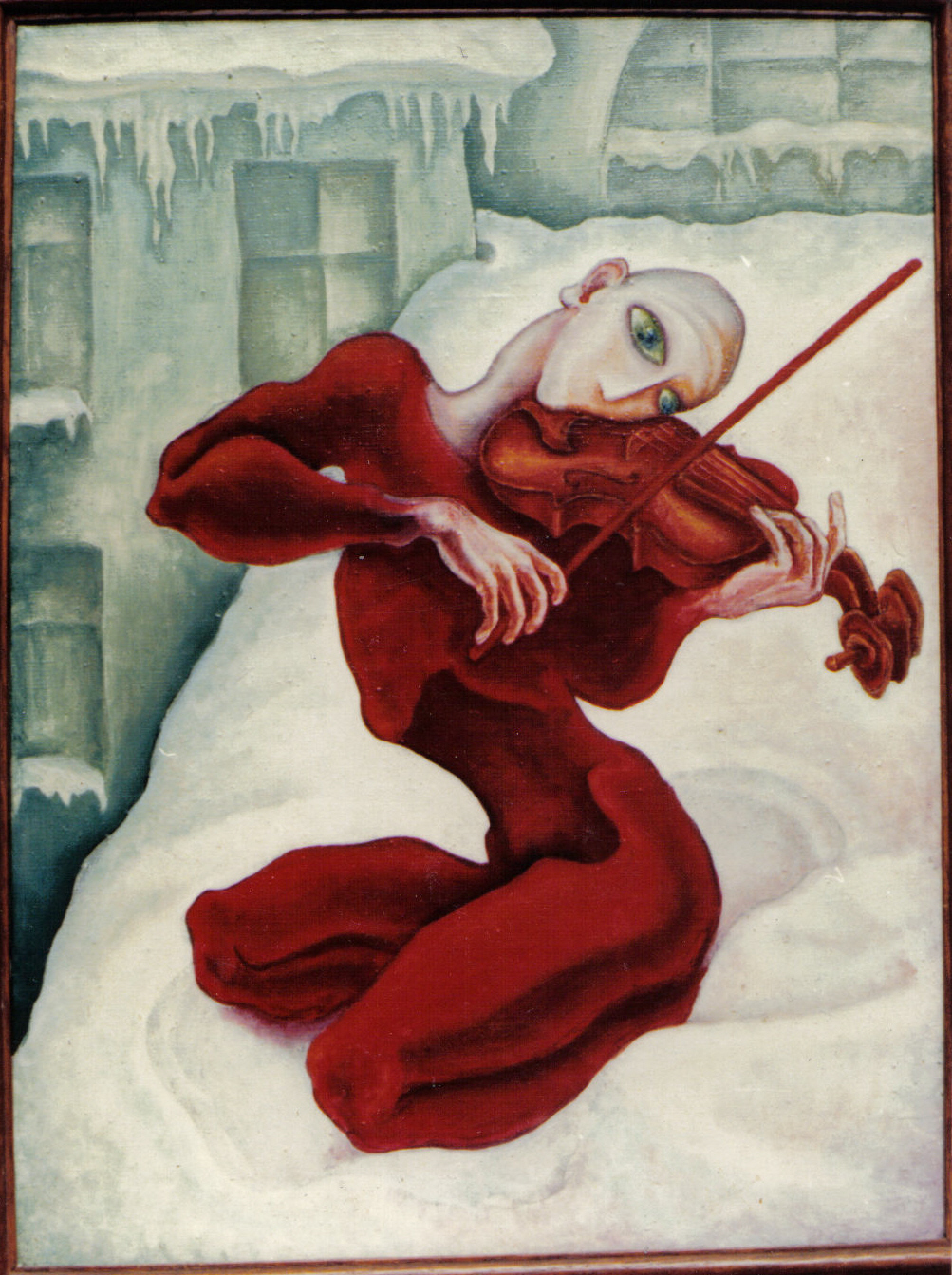
Red Fiddler, 1985.

Tatyana Apraksina (Russian: Татья́на Апра́ксина, IPA: [tɐˈtʲjanə ɐˈpraksʲɪnə]) is an artist and writer who also produces the magazine Apraksin Blues.

== Career ==
Apraksina settled in Leningrad in 1963 and started to live on Apraksin Lane (Apraksin pereulok) in 1972. The music-inflected unofficial culture of the time began to intersect actively with her life.

In 1974, "Apraksina" became her creative pseudonym. Her salon on Apraksin Lane hosted the original members of Akvarium, as well as nascent songwriter Mike Naumenko, who by the early 1980s as the founder of Zoopark would gain recognition as a key figure in Russian rock and blues music. In one of his late interviews, Mike revealed that "all [his] songs are dedicated to her."

Primarily self-taught, Apraksina managed to establish herself as a graphic artist, employed by factories, stores and movie theaters. Themes of early exhibits of her independent creative work included the courtyards of old Leningrad, particularly nearby Apraksin Dvor. She then began to gather material for a new direction in her work by studying the culture of music and musicians. She received permission to attend rehearsals of what is now the Saint Petersburg Philharmonic Orchestra and of other ensembles, doing so for four to six hours a day, getting to know musicians and producing hundreds of charcoal sketches, and reading music-related literature. She exhibited this early music-related work at what is now the Saint Petersburg Philharmonia. The hall's director, Dmitry Ivanovich Sollertinsky, facilitated her work by giving her an on-site studio and a pass granting access to nearly all rehearsals and concerts at the Philharmonia. During this period, Apraksina experienced conflicts with the KGB, nominally related to her contacts with foreigners.

Students and relatives of Dmitri Shostakovich assisted in the creation of Apraksina's first portrait of the composer, known for its unusual approach of depicting the composer's face at different ages on the same canvas. As part of the observances of Shostakovich's 80th birthday, the artist donated the portrait to what is now the Saint Petersburg Conservatory, which hung the work in Room 36, where the composer taught his classes. The portrait was later moved to today's Saint Peterburg Composers' Union, where it remains on permanent display.

In later years, Apraksina's exploration of classical music continued. In 1987, the Kurchatov Institute and the Glinka Museum of Musical Culture were among institutions in Moscow to host Apraksina's exhibits. She also worked with the Borodin Quartet. Apraksina's relationship with the composer Aleksandr Lokshin, occasioned by painting his portrait just prior to his death, would remain significant in later years as the artist took an active role in rehabilitating the slandered composer's reputation through her writing. The writing also embodied a first public statement of the risks to which painting and displaying the portrait had exposed her career.

Apraksina first exhibited in the United States as a Soviet artist through the Art League of Chicago and Soros Foundation support. The seven-month tour, featuring eleven exhibits from the East to the West Coast of the U.S., also included the artist's lectures.

In 1994, 1995 and 1997, Apraksina exhibited and lectured at the Ivan Sollertinsky International Music Festival in Vitebsk, Belarus.

In 1998, in the building of the Twelve Collegia, Saint Petersburg State University's Center for Contemporary Art held a retrospective exhibit drawn from Apraksina's body of work in parallel with her "March Solo" festival, organized in partnership with the Center for Cultural Studies at the university's department of philosophy. Her "brief segments" on creativity, Lessons for 'Orly, were published in the annual journal of the university's St. Petersburg Philosophical Society in 2000.

In 2008, Apraksina's California Psalms, written in Big Sur, was among the laureates of the international poetry competition held by the Russian Foreign Ministry in partnership with Literary Gazette. She has continued to produce "Apraksin Blues" while based in California. She is a member of the Prof. V.I. Startsev International Association of Historical Psychology.

In 2023, Apraksina received the Babel Prize for Literature from Mundus Artium Press.
