= Albert Leman =

Albert Semionovich Leman (surname sometimes spelt Lehman in English) (7 July [O.S. 24 June] 1915, Volsk, – 3 December 1998, Moscow) was a Soviet composer of classical music.

Albert Leman received his music education in the Leningrad Conservatory under Mikhail Gnessin and Vladimir Vladimirovich Nil'sen. In 1941-42 he was the chief of musical department at the Leningrad Regiment for Art of Leningrad Executive Committee. From 1942 he was living in Kazan, where he became in 1945 a professor at the Kazan Conservatory (1945—1970). From 1964 he was a member of the Communist Party of the UdSSR.

He also worked in the Petrozavodsk Conservatory (1969—1971), and in Moscow (1971-1998) where he performed until 1997 the duties of the Head of the Department for Composition at the Moscow Conservatory. Among his students were the composers Sofia Gubaidulina, Mikhail Kollontay and Olesya Rostovskaya.

Leman's music shows influence of Tatar folk music (e.g. in his "Violin concerto" and his "Suite on Tatar themes for orchestra"). Among his later works there is a Symphony, two Oratorios, piano music, cello concerto, music for theatre and chamber music. The violin concerto was recorded by Julian Sitkovetsky.
