= Nudo Mixteco =

- Theatrical release poster
- Directed by: Ángeles Cruz
- Written by: Ángeles Cruz
- Produced by: Lucía Carreras; Lola Ovando; Yossy Zagha
- Starring: Aída López; Eileen Yáñez; Sonia Couoh; Noé Hernández; Myriam Bravo; Jorge Doal
- Cinematography: Carlos Correa
- Edited by: Miguel Salgado
- Music by: Ruben Luengas
- Production company: Madrecine
- Release dates: March 9, 2021 (Miami); May 12, 2022 (Mexico)
- Running time: 91 minutes
- Country: Mexico
- Languages: Spanish; Southern Puebla Mixtec
- Box office: $8,338

Nudo Mixteco (lit. 'Mixtecan Knot') is a 2021 Mexican drama film written and directed by Ángeles Cruz in her directorial debut. Starring Aída López, Eileen Yáñez, Sonia Couoh, Noé Hernández, Myriam Bravo and Jorge Doal. The film was named on the shortlist for Mexican's entry for the Academy Award for Best International Feature Film at the 95th Academy Awards, but it was not selected.

== Synopsis ==
Within the framework of a patronal festival in San Mateo, in the Oaxacan Mixteca, three stories of women emerge that open the dialogue about what happens in the communities and that is rarely discussed. María returns to bury her mother and asks her childhood love, Piedad, to go with her. Chabela rejects her husband Esteban who went to the United States for three years because she now has another partner and Tona relives the pain of sexual abuse when she discovers that her attacker raped her daughter.

== Cast ==
The actors participating in this film are:

- Sonia Couoh as María
- Noé Hernández as Esteban
- Myriam Bravo as Toña
- Eileen Yáñez as Piedad
- Aída López as Chabela
- Jorge Doal as José Luis
- René González as Nato
- Sabel Sánchez as Patrocinia
- Francisca Jiménez Ramírez as Lipa
- José Antonio Fabián Arreola as Fermín
- Laura Susana Morales Mendoza as Rosita
- Efraín Cuevas Pérez as Gerardo

== Production ==
Principal photography of the film was in the community of Villa Guadalupe Victoria, San Miguel el Grande, in the state of Oaxaca, in Mexico where the director is from.

== Release ==
The film had its international premiere on March 9, 2021, at the Miami International Film Festival. It was commercially released on May 12, 2022, in Mexican theaters.

== Reception ==
=== Critical reception ===
Sergio Burnstein of the Los Angeles Times wrote: "Nudo Mixteco looks great, backed by a photography work that portrays the natural beauty of the region without ever neglecting its characters and its brave women, and also making room for some cultural, spiritual and culinary elements of the town that give it a particular authenticity. to the whole set." Demetrios Matheou of Screendaily wrote: "Angeles Cruz has fashioned a quietly powerful triptych of stories that speak about the plight of indigenous women in her country, combating the triple whammy of poverty, intolerance and toxic masculinity. While the subject’s a heavy one, Cruz’s compassionate and skillful storytelling, assisted by strong performances, results in a lighter, engaging alternative to the often hardcore Mexican approach to drama. And given the current openness to women’s stories, this deserves to find an audience beyond Latin territories."

=== Accolades ===
| Year | Award | Category | Recipient | Result | Ref. |
|---|---|---|---|---|---|
| 2021 | Vancouver Latin American Film Festival | Jury Prize | Nudo Mixteco | Won | |
| 2021 | Havana Film Festival New York | Best Director | Ángeles Cruz | Won | |
| 2021 | Minneapolis St. Paul International Film Festival | Emerging Filmmaker Award | Ángeles Cruz | Won | |
| 2021 | MOOOV Film Festival | Canvas Award (Jury Prize) | Nudo Mixteco - Ángeles Cruz | Won | |
| 2021 | San Sebastián International Film Festival | Best Latin American Film | Nudo Mixteco | Nominated | |
| 2021 | Seattle International Film Festival | Ibero American Competition | Nudo Mixteco | Nominated | |
| 2021 | San Francisco International Film Festival | Critics Jury Award | Nudo Mixteco | Won | |
| 2022 | Ariel Awards | Best Picture | Madrecine, Avanti Pictures, E12 Media y FOPROCINE-IMCINE\ | Nominated | |
| 2022 | Ariel Awards | Best Director | Ángeles Cruz | Nominated | |
| 2022 | Ariel Awards | Best First Work | Nudo Mixteco | Won | |
| 2022 | Ariel Awards | Best Actor | Noé Hernandez | Nominated | |
| 2022 | Ariel Awards | Best Supporting Actress | Aída López | Nominated | |
| 2022 | Ariel Awards | Best Original Screenplay | Ángeles Cruz | Nominated | |
| 2022 | Ariel Awards | Best Editing | Miguel Salgado | Nominated | |
| 2022 | Ariel Awards | Best Sound | Pablo Tamez and Rodrigo Castillo Filomarino | Nominated | |
| 2022 | Video Librarian | Best Narrative Film | Nudo Mixteco | Won | |
| 2022 | FICUNAM UNAM International Film Festival | Best Mexican Film | Ángeles Cruz | Nominated | |
| 2022 | Cleveland International Film Festival | New Direction Competition | Ángeles Cruz | Won | |
| 2022 | Hola México Film Festival | Film Line-Up | Nudo Mixteco | Nominated | |
| 2022 | Video Librarian | Best Narrative Film | Nudo Mixteco | Won | |
| 2023 | Premios Canacine | Best Director (Mejor Director) | Ángeles Cruz | Nominated | |
