= Lacadena =

Lacadena or La Cadena may refer to:

== Places ==
- Rural Municipality of Lacadena No. 228, Saskatchewan, Canada
  - Lacadena, Saskatchewan, an unincorporated community in the rural municipality
- La Cadena, a mountain in the Frigiliana municipality
- Estero La Cadena, a river of Chile

== People ==
- Alfonso Lacadena (1964–2018), a Spanish archaeologist, historian, and epigraphist
- Juan Ramón Lacadena (born 1934), a Spanish agronomical engineer
- Rodrigo de la Cadena (born 1988), Mexican singer, performer, songwriter, radio host and musician

== See also ==
- Cadena (disambiguation)
