= Mike Naumenko =

Soviet musician (1955–1991)

- Naumenko in 1984

Background information
- Also known as: Mike Naumenko
- Born: Mikhail Vasilyevich Naumenko; 18 April 1955; Leningrad, Soviet Union
- Died: 27 August 1991 (aged 36) Leningrad, Soviet Union
- Genres: Garage rock, blues rock, acoustic rock, pub rock, punk blues
- Occupations: Singer-songwriter; guitarist; translator; poet; sound engineer
- Instruments: Acoustic guitar, electric guitar, bass guitar
- Years active: 1975–1991
- Website: mikenaumenko.ru

Mikhail Vasilyevich Naumenko (Russian: Михаи́л Васи́льевич Нау́менко), better known as Mike Naumenko (Russian: Майк Науменко; 18 April 1955 – 27 August 1991), was a Soviet rock musician, singer-songwriter and interpreter, leader of the band Zoopark.

Born and raised in Leningrad, Naumenko became involved in the city's emerging rock scene in the second half of the 1970s and for a time performed with Aquarium. In 1981, he founded Zoopark, one of the leading blues rock and roots rock groups of the Soviet Union. Drawing on Chicago blues, British blues rock, rhythm and blues, pub rock and the Russian singer-songwriter tradition, Naumenko developed a distinctive style that combined Anglo-American rock idioms with the language and everyday realities of urban Leningrad. Naumenko's lyrics are distinguished by their conversational style, character-driven narratives, and a distinctive blend of melancholic irony, self-deprecating humour and understated emotional sincerity.

Naumenko is widely regarded as one of the finest lyricists of Russian-language rock. His songwriting was strongly influenced by artists such as Bob Dylan, Lou Reed, Marc Bolan and Chuck Berry. Some songs are close adaptations or reworkings of English-language originals, occasionally preserving melodic material, while others are stylistic pastiches that adopt the narrative voice, lyrical techniques or musical language of their models without reproducing them directly. Rather than simple imitation, these works are generally understood as creative adaptations that transplanted the Anglo-American rock tradition into the linguistic, cultural and social context of late Soviet Leningrad.

== Early years ==
Mikhail Naumenko studied at a "school with an intensive English-language program" in Leningrad, where he got his stage name, "Mike", presumably from his English teacher.

Naumenko became interested in music at the age of 8, when he heard a Beatles song for the first time from the street while he was standing on a balcony. The first rock bands that attracted his attention were The Beatles, The Rolling Stones, and Jefferson Airplane; also he collected magazine articles about T. Rex, The Doors and David Bowie. At the age of 15, he started playing guitar and writing his first songs. The lyrics of his first songs were in English, but in 1972–1973 he switched to Russian under the influence of his close friend, Boris Grebenshchikov. Besides music, he had lifetime interests in aeromodeling and in translating from English to Russian, which also started while he was at school.

After he graduated from high school, having followed an advice from his father, Mike went to Leningrad Institute of Civil Engineering (now Saint-Petersburg State University of Architecture and Civil Engineering), but during his 4th year of study he lost interest in the subject and dropped out. He worked as a sound engineer in Bolshoi Puppet Theatre (Russian: Большой театр кукол), then as a watchman. All this time Mike remained a musician.

Naumenko started his musical career in little-known Leningrad rock bands, such as "Soyuz Lyubiteley Muzyki Rock" ("Union of Lovers of Rock-Music", Russian: "Союз любителей музыки рок") and "Vokalno-instrumentalnaya gruppirovka imeni Chacka Berry" ("Vocal-instrumental Band Named in Honor of Chuck Berry", Russian: "Вокально-инструментальная группировка им. Чака Берри"), which mostly played classical rock-n-roll songs from 1950s – 1970s. In the second half of 1970s, he performed with Aquarium, a prominent Leningrad rock band, as a guitarist.

In the summer of 1978, Naumenko and Boris Grebenshchikov (the leader of Aquarium) recorded an acoustic album "Vse brat'ya – sestry" ("All Brothers are Sisters", Russian: "Все братья – сестры"). The recording was done with a "Mayak-202", a serial soviet tape recorder, on the bank of Neva River in Leningrad. The themes of the songs were heavily influenced by the creative works of Bob Dylan. The only instruments used were a guitar and a harmonica, and the recording quality was far from perfect. However, many songs from this album later became very well known on the Russian rock scene.

Two years later, in the summer of 1980, Mike recorded his first solo album called "Sladkaya N i Drugie" ("Sweet N and Others", Russian: "Сладкая N и другие") with the help of Boris Grebenshchikov and Vyacheslav Zorin (guitar). The recording took place in the studio of Bolshoi Puppet Theatre. The total number of recorded songs was 32, however only 15 of them were included in the album. The album quickly became famous in Moscow, and Mike became recognizable as a "Bob Dylan from Leningrad".

Naumenko's lyrical muse has been identified as the Leningrad artist Tatyana Apraksina, as reflected in songs such as "Sweet N," "If It Rains," "Your River's Blues" and "Morning for Two". According to Naumenko, in a late interview, "All my songs are dedicated to her."

== Zoopark ==
In 1981, Naumenko organized the Zoopark rock band in which he was a lead vocalist and an art director until his death. With his band, he traveled a lot and visited many cities of the USSR.

Naumenko's vocals weren't great so he performed his songs in recitative style. He obtained popularity mostly because the lyrics of his songs were full of irony and satire. The majority of his songs were a first-person narrative, though, as he claimed in the interviews, it didn't mean that this person was himself.

The lyrics of Naumenko's songs were often translations or interpretations of the Western rock songs of Bob Dylan, Lou Reed or T. Rex. Sometimes he left the original melody intact too, e.g., one could compare "Zolotie Lvi" ("Golden Lions", "Золотые львы") and "Pozvoni mne rano utrom" ("Call Me Early in the Morning", "Позвони мне рано утром") with Dylan's "Idiot Wind" and "Meet Me in the Morning"; or "Ya lublu bugi-vugi" ("I love Boogie-Woogie", "Я люблю буги-вуги") with "I Love to Boogie". There was no "plagiarism"-related agenda in the specifics of USSR, thus Mike's "recipiency" was accepted as a way to digest the Western musical and lyrical traditions in the Russian way.

== Later years and death ==
In the late 1980s, Mike started facing troubles related to health and household issues, mainly due to alcohol abuse. The ability to move his left hand deteriorated and he could hardly play the guitar. His wife also left him.

Naumenko died in Leningrad on 27 August 1991, at the age of 36, as a result of cerebral hemorrhage caused by an accident in his flat.

However, there's another version to the story. Zoopark's drummer Valeriy Kirillov states that the reason for Mike's death was cerebral hemorrhage, but it wasn't of a natural cause. The real reason was a fracture of the skull base that Mike received during a robbery attack near his house. This was allegedly confirmed by the fact that Mike's personal belongings were absent. Also, there was allegedly a witness who saw somebody help Mike get up from the ground. After the assault, Mike was able to get to his apartment where he eventually collapsed and laid unconscious without being noticed. When finally he was discovered and an ambulance was summoned, it was too late. However, many people who knew the details of his death don't confirm this version.

Naumenko was buried in Volkovo Cemetery, Saint Petersburg.

== Legacy ==
Mike's memory has been honored with numerous tribute albums (see Discography below) and in other creative works including a 2009 novel and a "blues opera" that premiered in 2011. A collection of Naumenko's complete writings – including his samizdat translation of Richard Bach's Illusions — was being prepared for publication in 2015.

He appears as a character in Leto, a 2018 Russian biographical film about Viktor Tsoi, where he is played by Roman Bilyk.

== Discography ==
=== with Zoopark ===
- 1981 — Blues de Moscou
- 1983 — Uyezdny gorod N
- 1984 — Belaya polosa
- 1987 — Illyuzii
- 1987 — Bugi‐Vugi Kazhdy Den
- 1989 — W
- 1991 — Muzyka dlya filma
- 1996 — Legendy Russkogo roka
- 1999 — The Best

=== Solo ===
- 1978 — Vse bratya – sestry (with Boris Grebenshchikov)
- 1980 — Sladkaya N i drugiye
- 1982 — LV
- 1985 — Zhizn v Zooparke
- 1996 — Vesna‐leto (with Viktor Tsoi)
- 1996 — 12–13 yanvarya 1985 goda, Moscow (with Viktor Tsoi)
- 1997 — Kvartirnik (with Sergey Ryzhenko)
- 1998 — Mike Naumenko. Viktor Tsoi (with Viktor Tsoi)
- 1998 — Ispolneniye razresheno (with Boris Grebenshchikov and Viktor Tsoi)
- 2009 — Leningrad 1984 (with Viktor Tsoi)
- 2010 — 25 oktyabrya 1980 Moscow (with Aquarium)

=== Tributes ===
- 1993 — Pesni Mayka
- 1998 — Park Maykskogo perioda
- 2000 — Remayk
- 2001 — Rom i Pepsi‐kola (Dmitry Dibrov i "Antropologiya")
- 2002 — Zoopark tribyut – Pesni Mayka
- 2005 — Tribyut Mayku Naumenko, 50 let. Uyezdny gorod N 20 let spustya
- 2008 — Gryaznye blyuzy (Aleksandr Dyomin)
