= Leonid Martynov =

Russian poet (1905–1980)

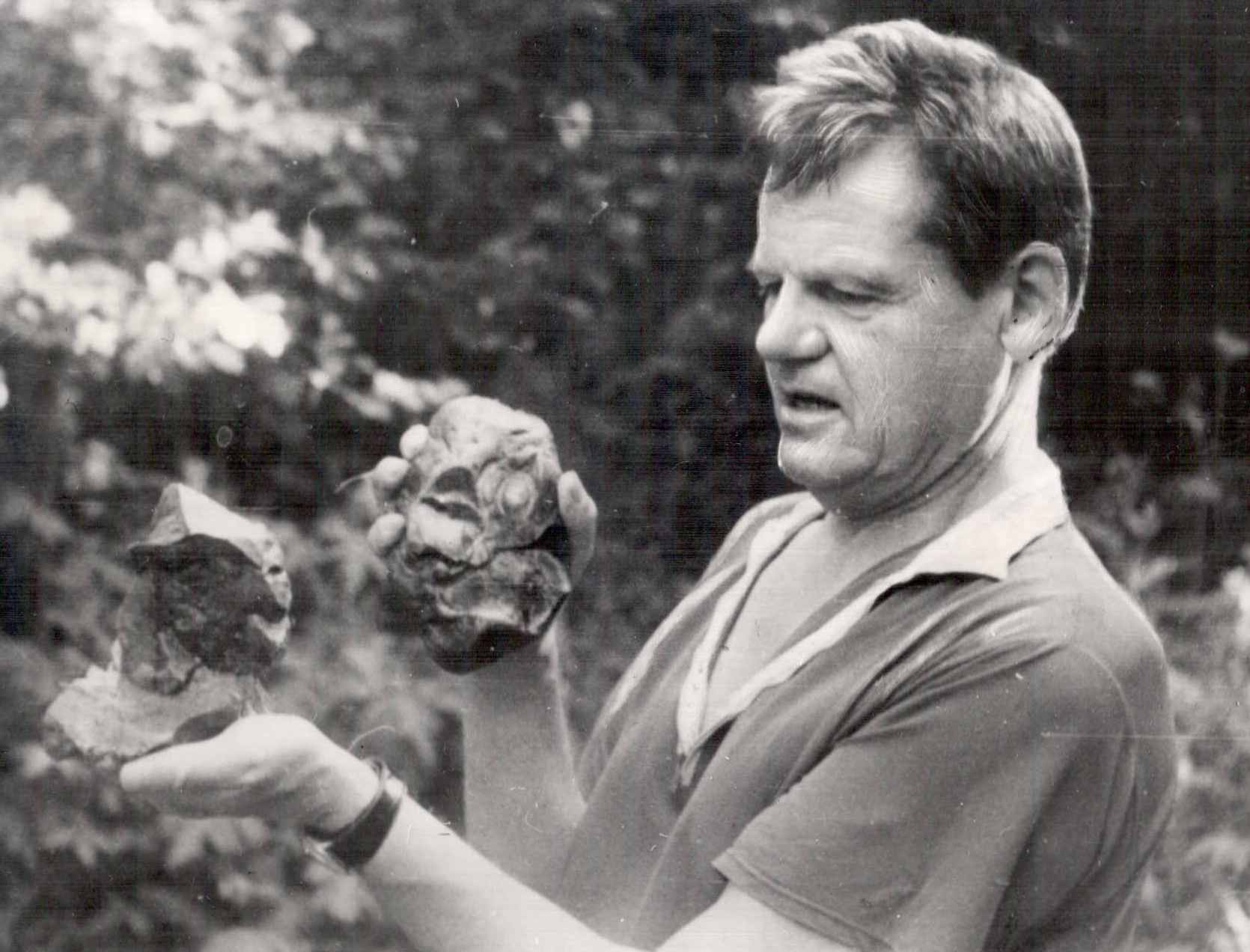
Leonid Martynov in 1963. His hobby was collecting stones

Leonid Nikolayevich Martynov (Russian: Леонид Николаевич Мартынов; 22 May 1905, Omsk – 21 June 1980, Moscow) was a Soviet poet, journalist and translator. Laureate of three Orders of the Red Banner of Labour (1965, 1970, 1975) and a USSR State Prize (1974).

== Career ==
Between 1939 and 1945 he published three books of poetry, but only became better known after the death of Stalin. From 1955, his poems began to be published widely in magazines and in book form.

His style is of the old school of the 1920s, with many local references to Siberia.

=== Musical settings ===
Aleksandr Lokshin set five poems by Martynov in his Ninth Symphony.
