= Aleksandr Lokshin =

Soviet composer (1920–1987)

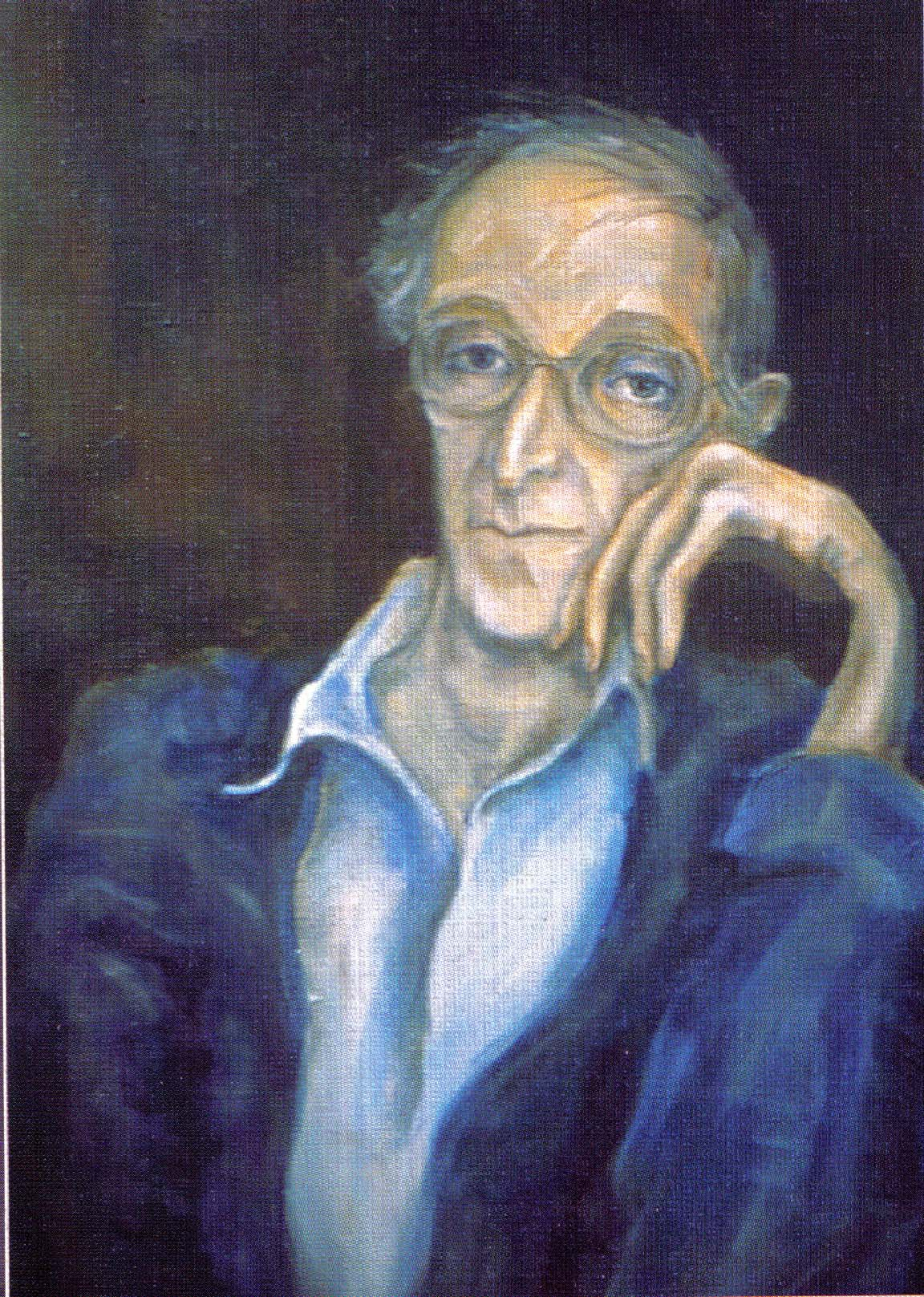
Portrait of the Composer Aleksandr Lokshin by Tatyana Apraksina, 1987.

Aleksandr Lazarevich Lokshin (Russian: Алекса́ндр Ла́заревич Локши́н) (1920–1987) was a Soviet composer of classical music. He was born on 19 September 1920 in the town of Biysk, in the Altai Region, Western Siberia, and died in Moscow on 11 June 1987.

An admirer of Mahler and Alban Berg, he created his own musical language; he wrote eleven symphonies plus symphonic works including Les Fleurs du Mal (1939, on Baudelaire's poems), Three Scenes from Goethe's Faust (1973, 1980), the cantata Mater Dolorosa (1977, on verses from Akhmatova's Requiem). Only his Symphony No 4 is purely instrumental; all his other symphonies include vocal parts. Symphony No 3 by Lokshin was written on Kipling's verses, and a ballet Fedra was staged to music from Symphony No 4. Lokshin also wrote a cycle of piano variations for Maria Grinberg (1953) and another one for Yelena Kushnerova (1982).

== Life ==
=== Early life ===
The composer's father, Lazar Lokshin, was an accountant and his mother, Maria Korotkina, a midwife.

Lokshin's sister, Maria, was born in 1914. The family suffered from communist repression, Lokshin's father having been classified as a capitalist because of their small farm business. Their land and cattle were confiscated, and Maria was expelled from medical school for having made a joke.

After the family moved to Novosibirsk, the young Lokshin was trained at school by excellent teachers who had been exiled to Siberia from Moscow and Saint Petersburg. The renowned pianist Aleksey Shteyn, a former professor of the Saint Petersburg Conservatory, laid the foundations of Lokshin's piano playing.

In 1936 Lokshin arrived in Moscow with a letter of recommendation from Shteyn and was examined by Genrikh Neygauz (Heinrich Neuhaus), Director of the Moscow Conservatory. He was admitted to the Moscow Central School of Music and then, six months later, was accepted as a student at the Conservatory, where he studied composition with the composer Nikolay Myaskovsky.

In 1941 Lokshin presented his symphonic work Les Fleurs du Mal (recording BIS, 2010) as his diploma work for graduation from the Moscow Conservatory. However, as the lyrics by Charles Baudelaire were considered by the censors to be contradictory to communist ideology, Lokshin was denied the Moscow Conservatory Diploma and was not allowed to take the state examinations. Nevertheless, he already was a member of the Composer's Union.

=== World War II ===
During World War II Lokshin was in Moscow and later returned to Novosibirsk. In July 1941 he enlisted in the people's volunteer corps but after a strong bout of stomach ulcers he was declared unfit for military service. During the summer and the beginning of autumn 1941 he served as a fireman extinguishing incendiary bombs on the roof of the Moscow Conservatory during air raids; then he was evacuated to Novosibirsk. The arrival of the Leningrad Symphony Orchestra in Novosibirsk led to Yevgeny Mravinsky conducting a performance of Lokshin's vocal-symphonic poem Wait for me (lyrics by Konstantin Simonov). The piece received high praise from Ivan Sollertinsky, helping Lokshin's return to Moscow after the end of the war. He was able to take the state examinations, obtained the Conservatory diploma with Wait for me as the diploma work. Then, with Nikolay Myaskovsky's support, Lokshin was hired as Assistant Lecturer in Instrumentation at the Moscow Conservatory. In this capacity he worked from 1945 to 1948, the only working position held by the composer during his entire life.

=== The Zhdanov purges ===
At the height of the anti-cosmopolitan campaign and music purges of 1948, directed by Andrey Zhdanov, Lokshin was expelled from the Moscow Conservatory for popularizing among his students what was considered to be the ideologically alien music of Mahler, Alban Berg, Stravinsky, and Shostakovich. Efforts by Nikolay Myaskovsky, Maria Yudina, and Yelena Gnesina to get him another job were fruitless, and for the rest of his life Lokshin supported his family by composing music for film and theater.

=== Accusation of being an NKVD informer ===
After Stalin's death, Lokshin was accused by Alexander Esenin-Volpin and Vera Prokhorova of being an informer for the NKVD. Lokshin denied ever being an informer and it has not been proven that he was.

According to Lokshin's son, the composer was the victim of a calumny, and the real source of the charge that Lokshin was an informer was not the former Gulag prisoners, but Stalin’s secret police itself, which had employed a practice of deceiving its victims by redirecting their suspicions. Lokshin's son claimed that the aim of these efforts was to defend an active agent of the secret police. The arguments and documents obtained by Lokshin's son persuaded Yelena Bonner to stand up for Lokshin. On 8 January 2009 Bonner wrote: "From a certain point I have no more relation to the museum [i.e. the Sakharov Center] … since I did not find Aleksandr Lokshin's [i.e.the composer's son] address [I ask] to let him know that I asked a member of the Public Commission to ask the director of the museum to take away from the [web] site the material mentioned by Aleksandr Lokshin. And more than that – I am always on my guard when I consider all the supposedly unmasking materials. And in the most part of the cases I do not trust them." It is also impossible to ignore the historical fact that Lokshin's Requiem was performed at the closing of the IV Conference "Resistance in the Gulag" (2002). The great pianist Maria Yudina, known for her outstanding fearlessness and absolute intolerance to moral uncleanliness, wrote to her friend, book historian V. Lyublinsky, after meeting Lokshin in 1961: “I am glad that the man accomplished his task, that he lives in this world for a reason, that I was not mistaken in believing in him, and was not mistaken in helping him in everyday life, and was his friend in difficult days and hours.” https://novayagazeta.ru/articles/2025/01/06/mnogoe-chto-schitaiut-obshchestvennym-mneniem-formiruetsia-v-kgb This documentary evidence is obviously no less valuable than Elena Bonner’s letter and the performance of Lokshin’s music at the Resistance in the Gulag conference in 2002.

=== Performances of Lokshin's music ===
As a result of these accusations, performances of his music had become rare and were met with resistance from liberal-thinking intellectuals, notably Gennady Rozhdestvensky who for a time refused to perform Lokshin's music (although he had earlier recorded one of the symphonies, and gave the premiere of the Third during his period with the BBC orchestra). Still, most of Lokshin's works have been performed and recorded occasionally. Among his compositions which were never performed are his Symphony No 6 on verses by Aleksandr Blok and The Cockroach (Tarakanishche), a comic oratorio (on a poem by Korney Chukovsky, considered to contain anti-Khrushchev innuendo). Rudolf Barshai in collaboration with Viktor Popov prepared Symphony No 6 for performance, however the performance of this composition was prohibited by the Communist Party for being too mournful for the Soviet public. Among Lokshin's own compositions which he never heard performed are the cantata Mater Dolorosa (1977) on verses from Akhmatova's Requiem, which was prohibited in the Soviet Union at the time. In 1981 Lokshin had passed the score of Mater Dolorosa abroad to Rudolf Barshai. However, it was impossible for Barshai to perform this composition in the West in view of the unpredictable consequences this could have had for Lokshin. Barshai's performance of Lokshin’s Requiem at the closing of the IV International conference "Resistance in the Gulag" (Moscow, 29 May 2002) was the first essential step on the way to Lokshin's posthumous rehabilitation.

== List of compositions ==
- [1939] Les Fleurs du Mal, symphonic poem to verses by Charles Baudelaire. For soprano and BSO. 25 min.
- [1942] Wait for Me, symphonic poem to verses by K. Simonov. For mezzo-soprano and BSO. 15 min.
- [1947] Childish Suite for two pianos. 19 min.
- [1952] Hungarian Fantasia for violin and BSO. 15 min.
  - [1952] Author’s transcription of the Hungarian Fantasia for violin and piano. 15 min.
- [1953] Variations for piano. 24 min.
- [1955] Quintet for clarinet and string quartet. 23 min.
- [1957] Symphony No 1 (Requiem) for BSO and mixed chorus. To a medieval Latin text (Dies irae). 43 min.
- [1960] In the Jungle, suite for BSO. 25 min.
- [1960–1970] Piano pieces for children.
- [1961 ?] On the Lakes of Kazakhstan, suite for BSO. 10 min.
- [1962] Tarakanishche, brief comic oratorium for BSO and mixed chorus to verses by K. Tchukovsky. 12 min.
- [1963] Symphony No 2 (Greek Epigrams) for BSO and mixed chorus to verses by ancient Greek poets. 33 min.
- [1966] Symphony No 3 for baritone, BSO and man’s chorus to verses by R. Kipling. 32 min.
- [1968] Symphony No 4 for BSO. 15 min.
- [1968] Speaking Out Loud, symphonic poem for bass and BSO to verses by Mayakovsky. 20 min.
- [1969] Symphony No 5 (Shakespeare’s Sonnets) for baritone, string orchestra and harp. 17 min.
- [1971] Symphony No 6 for baritone, BSO and mixed chorus to verses by Alexander Block. 40 min.
- [1972] Symphony No 7 for contralto and chamber orchestra to verses by medieval Japanese poets. 20 min.
- [1973] Margaret’s Songs for soprano and BSO to verses from Goethe’s Faust (translated into Russian by Pasternak). 22 min.
- [1973] Symphony No 8 for tenor and BSO to verses by Pushkin (Songs of Western Slabyans). 28 min.
- [1975] Symphony No 9 for baritone and string orchestra to verses by Leonid Martynov (1905–1980). 23min.
- [1976] Symphony No 10 for contralto, mixed chorus, BSO and organ to verses by N. Zabolotsky. 33 min.
- [1976] Symphony No 11 for soprano and chamber orchestra to verses by Luís de Camões. Dedicated to Rudolf Barshai. 20 min.
- [1977] Mater Dolorosa, cantata for mezzo-soprano, BSO and mixed chorus to verses from Akhmatova’s Requiem and the Russian Funeral Service. 23 min.
- [1978] Quintet for two violins, two violas and cello (in memoria of Dmitri Shostakovich). 23 min.
- [1980] Three Scenes from Goethe’s Faust, mono-opera for soprano and BSO to verses from Goethe’s Faust (translated into Russian by Boris Pasternak). 36 min.
- [1981] Quintet From Lyrics by François Villon for tenor and string quartet to Villon’s verses translated (non-equirhythmically) into Russian by Erenburg. 13 min.
- [1981] The Art of Poetry for soprano and chamber orchestra to verses by N. Zabolotsky. 9 min.
  - [1981] Author’s transcription of The Art of Poetry for soprano and piano.
- [1982] Prelude and Theme with Variations for piano. Dedicated to Elena Kuschnerova. 8 min.
- [1983] The First Sinfonietta for tenor and chamber ensemble to verses by Igor Severyanin. 13 min.
- [1983] Three Poems by Fyodor Sologub for soprano and piano. 13 min.
- [1983] Variations for bass and wind band to early verses by N. Tikhonov. 13 min.
- [1984] String Quartet. 23 min.
- [1985] The Second Sinfonietta for soprano and enlarged chamber orchestra to verses by F. Sologub. 15 min.
