= Olesya Rostovskaya =

Russian musician and composer (born 1975)

- Олеся Ростовская
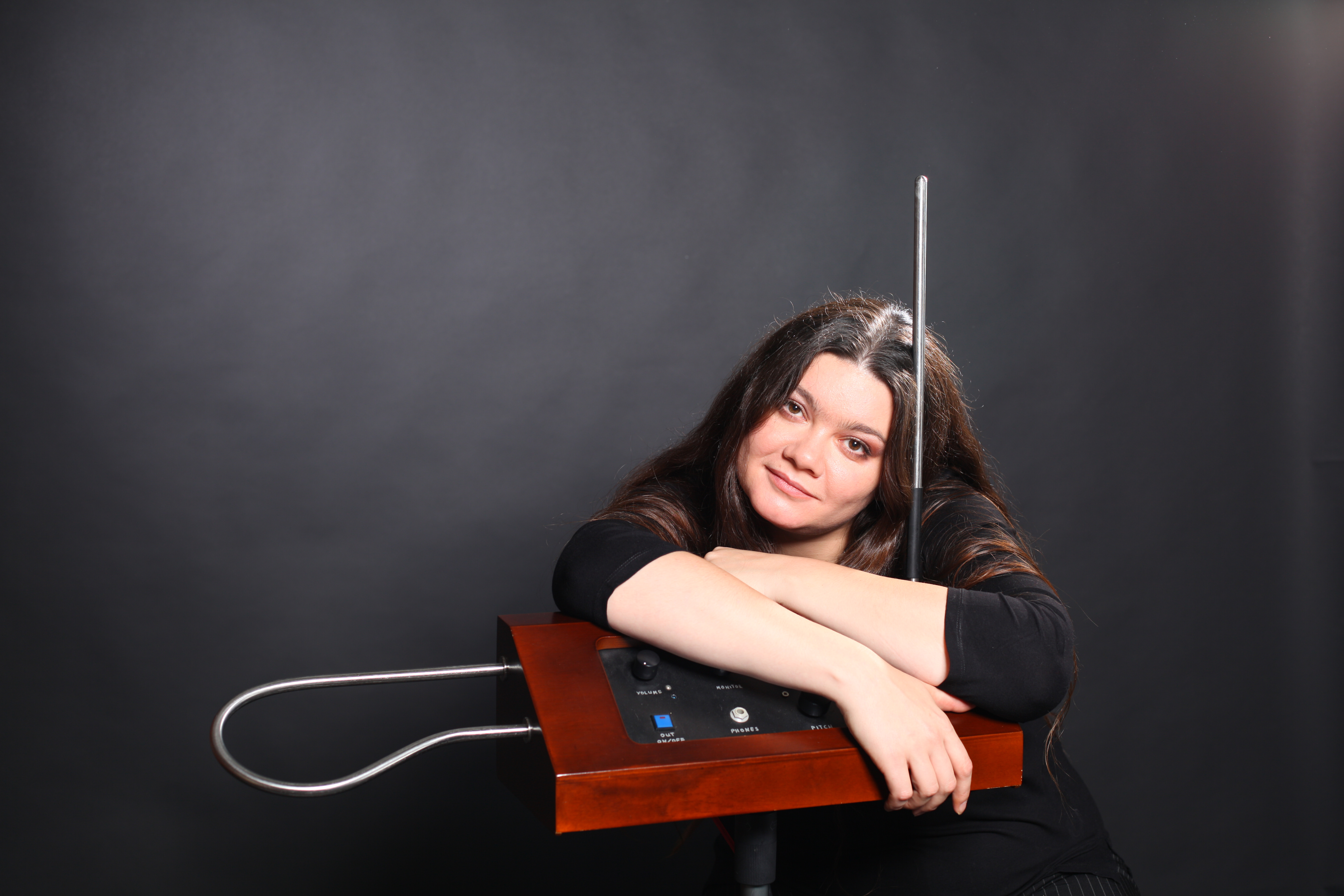
- Rostovskaya with theremin made by Andrey Smirnov
- Born: 6 January 1975 (age 51)
- Occupations: Musician; composer
- Musical career
- Origin: Near Moscow, Russia
- Genres: Classical, contemporary
- Instruments: Theremin; carillon; organ; Zvon
- Label: Artes Mirabiles

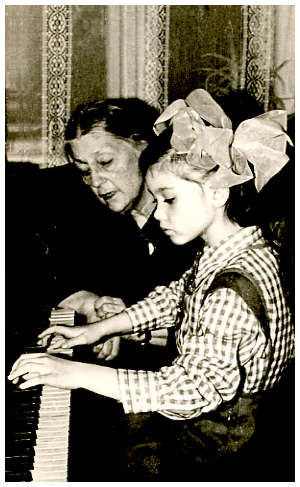
Olesya Rostovskaya with her first teacher Anna Artobolevskaya

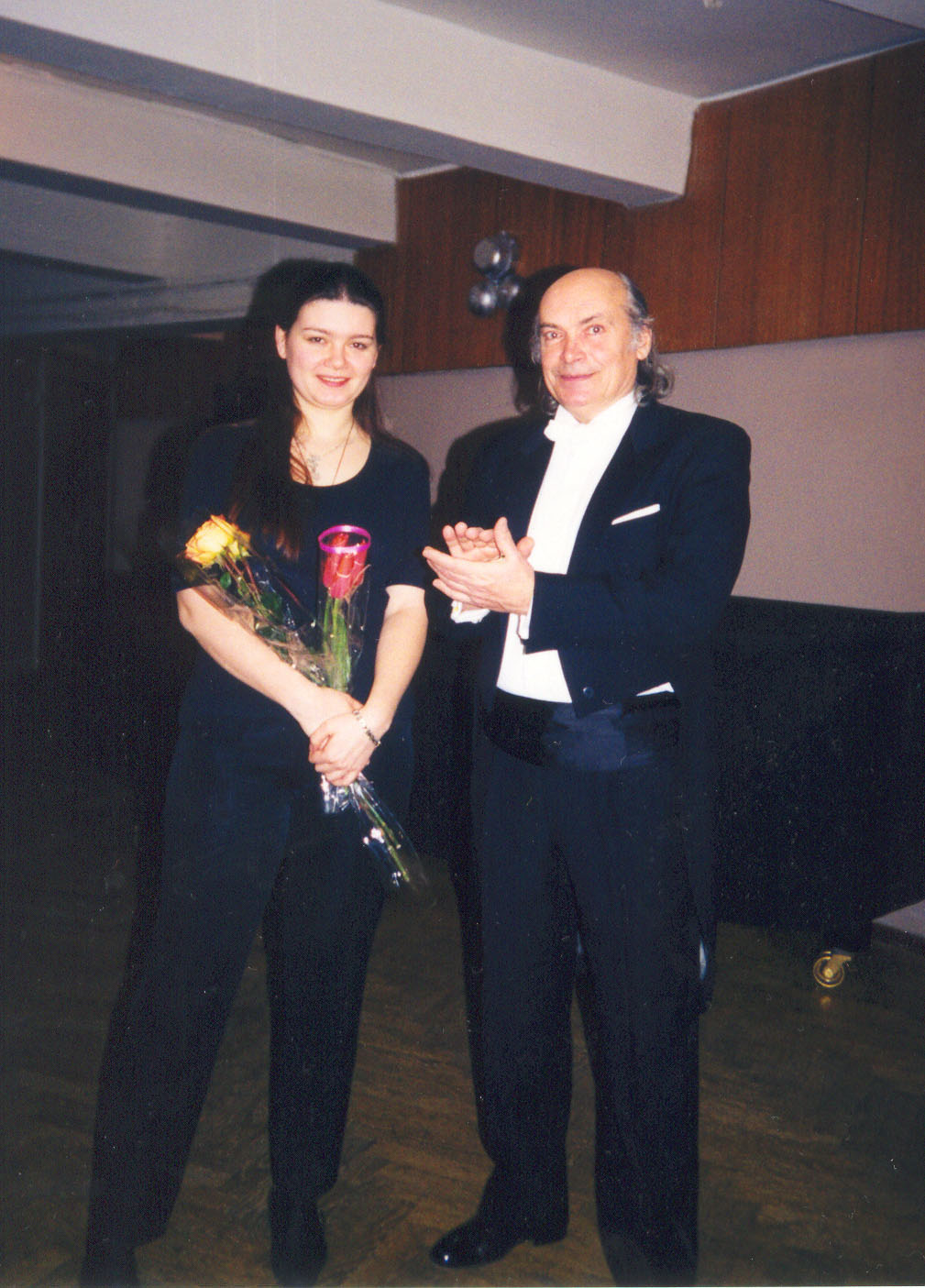
Olesya Rostovskaya with her organ professor Oleg Yanchenko

Olesya Rostovskaya (Russian: Олеся Ростовская; born 6 January 1975) is a Russian composer, theremin player, carillonneur, organist, and campanologist.

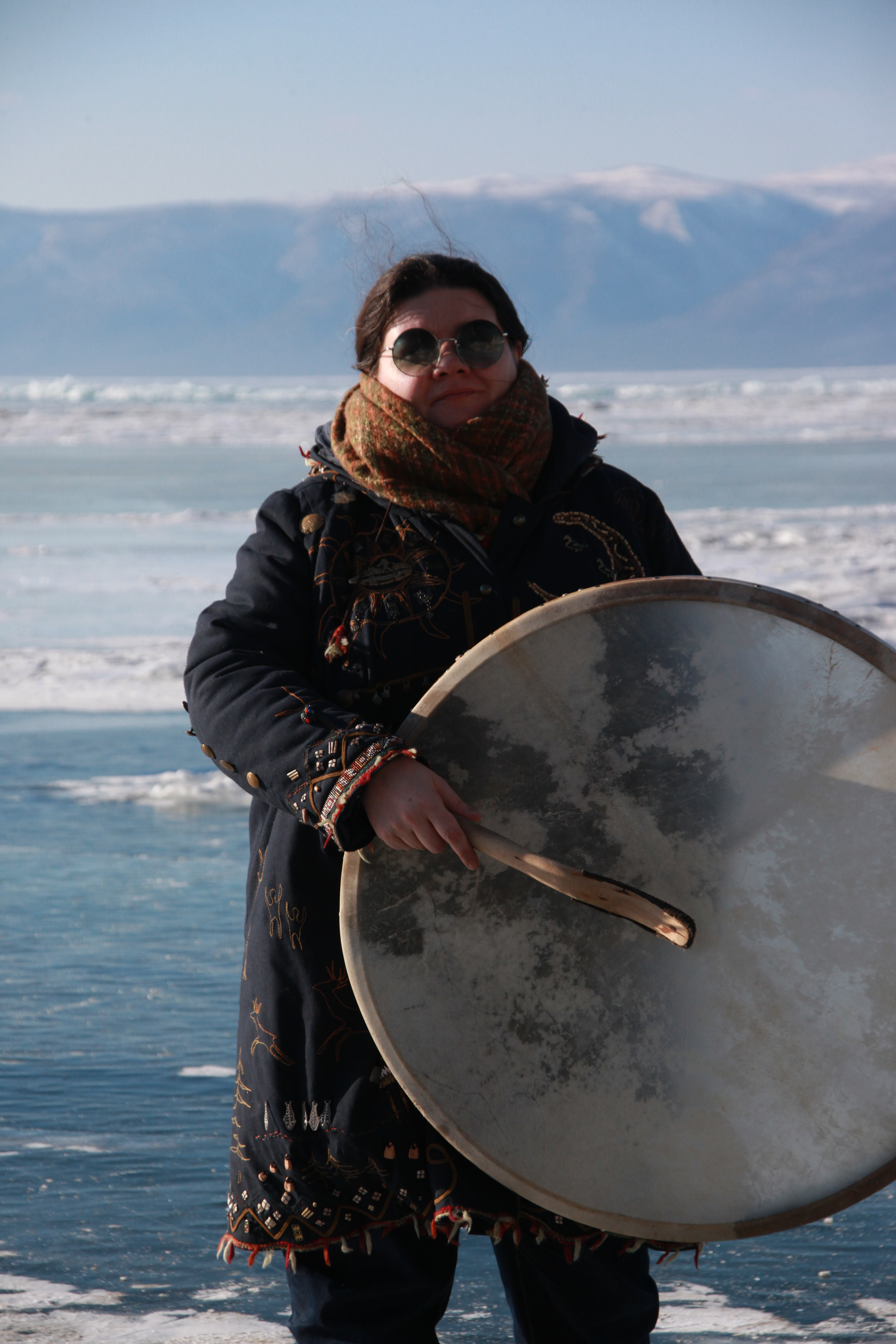
Olesya Rostovskaya is playing a shaman's drum on ice of Baikal lake

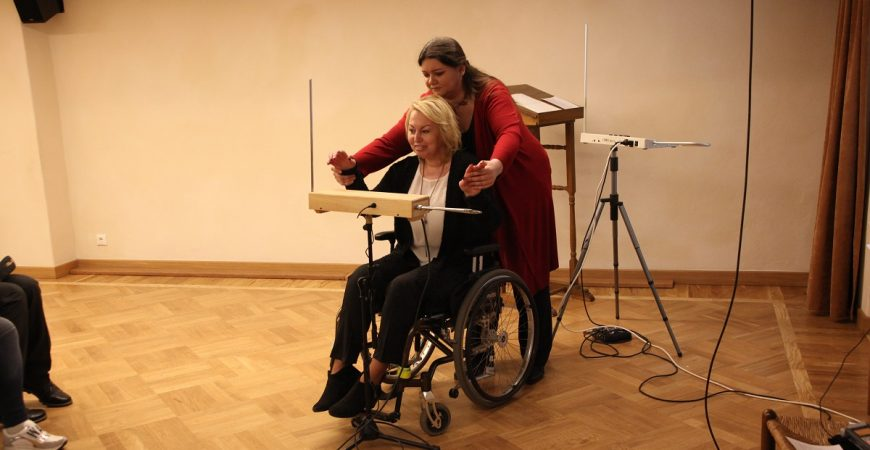
Olesya Rostovskaya at workshop for MOTUS VITA in Riga

== Discography ==
- Soul of a Bell. Russian Music on Carillon (Audio CD) — AM 090000, © Artes Mirabiles, 2009
- Nikolai Obouhov. Croix Sonore (Audio CD) - SMC CD 0083, © & (P) Moscow State Tchaikovsky Conservatoire, 2012
- What Peter The Great Heard From The Carillon Tower (Audio CD + DSD 256) — AM 160001, © Artes Mirabiles, 2016
- Soul of a Bell 2 (Audio CD + DSD 256) — AM 170002, © Artes Mirabiles, 2017
- Tanido Espanol (Audio CD + DSD 256) — AM 170003, © Artes Mirabiles, 2017
- 16 Century Discothèque (Audio CD + DSD 256) — AM 170004, © Artes Mirabiles, 2017
- The Bells of Northern Skies (Audio CD + DSD 256) — AM 180005, © Artes Mirabiles, 2018
- The Organ In A Russian Home (Audio CD + DSD 256) — AM 180007, © Artes Mirabiles, 2018
- Weightlessness - theremin and electric violin (Audio CD + DSD 512) — AM 190008, © Artes Mirabiles, 2019
- 5 Parts from 'Missa Electronica Paschalis' for theremin, voices, organ and electronics (DSD 512) — AM 200010, © Artes Mirabiles, 2020

== Awards ==
- Sacred music contest (1996, Russia)
- First National Young Composers Contest (1999, Russia)
- “New generation music” festival (2000, Russia)
- Massalitinov's national music contest (2005, Russia)
- Piano improvisation contest (2006, Russia)
- 10th ARTIADA of Russia (2009, Russia)
- «Pure Sound 2019» International Award for the Best Audio Recording of Russian Academic Music (2019, Russia)
- «Pure Sound 2021» International Award for the Best Audio Recording of Russian Academic Music for solo album «Like Breath. Carillon improvisations»
