= Cadena (company) =

Kuwaiti technology and services company

Cadena Solutions LLC
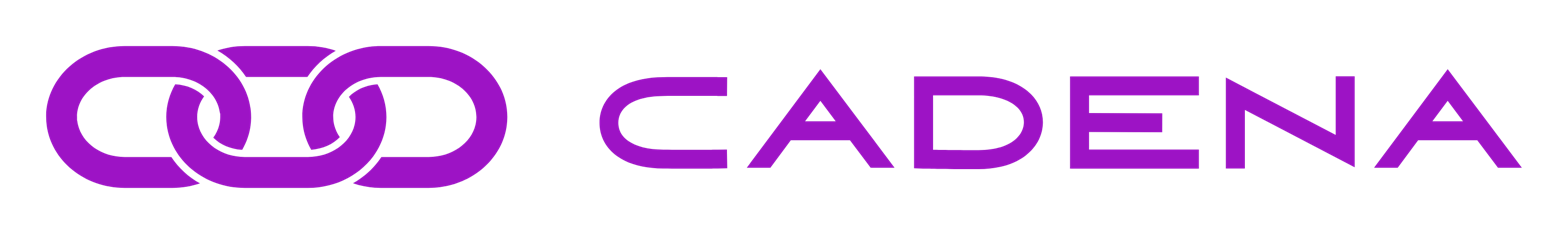
- Company type: Private
- Industry: Technology, Services
- Founded: 2017; 9 years ago
- Founder: Sid Dhamija; Dr. Yusuf Al Hasan
- Headquarters: Dubai, UAE
- Key people: Sid Dhamija (CEO); Dr. Yusuf Al Hasan (Chairman)
- Revenue: US$35 million (2023)
- Number of employees: 350+
- Website: www.cadena.ae

Cadena is a technology and services company founded in 2017 in Kuwait City, Kuwait. The company was established by Sid Dhamija and Dr. Yusuf Al Hasan. Initially a spinoff of As-Shuraa Financial, Cadena operates under the legal name Cadena Solutions LLC.

== History ==
Cadena was founded in 2017 in Kuwait by Sid Dhamija, who serves as the company's CEO, with support from Dr. Yusuf Al Hasan, Chairman of As-Shuraa Financial. By the end of 2017, Cadena expanded its operations with the establishment of Cadena Qatar W.L.L. as a representative office in Qatar. Cadena's initial seed investment of US$2.4 million was provided by Sid Dhamija and Dr. Yusuf Al Hasan.

In 2018, Cadena continued its expansion into the UAE, where it registered Cadena FZCO. The company established its headquarters in Dubai and expanded its presence in Abu Dhabi. Additionally, Cadena MENA was registered in Saudi Arabia.

Between 2019 and 2020, Cadena extended its operations to the US and Mexico. In Saudi Arabia, Cadena MENA expanded its local team, with Basheer Mohammed leading the divisions in the West, Central, and East regions.

From 2020 to 2022, Cadena launched the Cadena GCC Discovery Portal. Through machine learning, the portal identifies key accounts and prospects across the GCC. The company also established data processing centers in the LATAM region and expanded its operations to Asia, establishing Cadena Asia with operational bases in Malaysia, Singapore, and Indonesia.

In September 2022, the company secured US$18 million from the Kuwait Investment Authority and China Equity.

In 2023, Cadena was awarded "Best Service Provider 2023" at CSSCOPE 2023 in Hangzhou, China. The same year, Cadena opened a representative office in Spain and launched CadenaPay, a service focused on timely payments for providers, in Mexico City.

In November 2023, ADCN & Partners invested US$43 million in the company.

== Activities ==
Cadena is focused on services, including Go-To-Market services, prospecting teams across the Gulf Region, USA, and APAC, sales and account management, overseas invoicing, invoice factoring through CadenaPay, overseas late payments recovery, and software customer support. The company's product lineup includes the Cadena Discovery Portal, Cadena Account Manager, BuyBeacon AI, IntelliConnect AI, and CadenaPay.

Its key markets include Germany, the US, Luxembourg, India, Singapore, and China. Clients include PwC, Nagarro, SAP, Moglix, PeopleStrong, Econocom, Cirtuo, and COSCO Shipping.
