= Oscar Cadena =

Mexican television host (1945–2021)

Oscar Cadena (November 10, 1945, Mexico City – October 28, 2021) was a Mexican journalist, television host, and environmentalist known in Mexico for his TV shows Camara Infraganti and Encadenate.

== Career ==
In the 1980s, Oscar Cadena created and hosted his show, Camara Infraganti.

Due to a heart attack he suffered in 2001, he decided to end his contract with Televisa and chose instead to become a local reporter in Cancún, Mexico.

== Death ==
Cadena died on October 28, 2021, after suffering a heart attack.
