= Carlos Cadena Gaitan =

Colombian scientist and urban activist (born 1983)

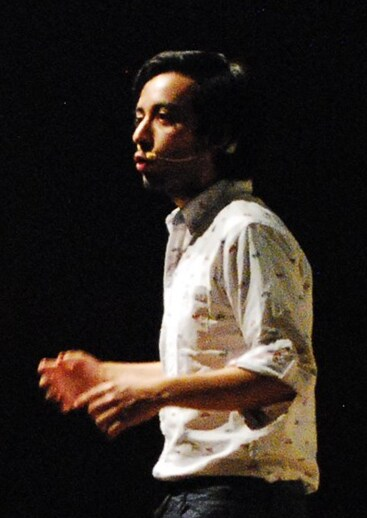
Carlos Cadena Gaitan, in 2015

Carlos Cadena Gaitan (born June 6, 1983, Medellín) is a Colombian sustainability expert, professor, research and urban activist. Cadena Gaitan holds a Ph.D. from the University of Maastricht in the Netherlands, and is an affiliated researcher with the United Nations University (UNU-MERIT). He has served as Transport Commissioner of Medellín, Colombia and is a full-member of the State of Antioquia Scientific Committee for the Climate Crisis.

Cadena Gaitán served as the general coordinator for the 4th World Bike Forum, held in Medellín, Colombia, from February 26 to March 1, 2015. With over 7000 participants, this forum broke attendance records, becoming the world's largest urban cycling conference.

In June 2016 Carlos Cadena Gaitán was nominated as one of seven outstanding emerging leaders from across the globe were shortlisted for the Inspired Leadership Award 2016

In 2015, he was recognized by Semana magazine as one of the leading urban activists in Colombia. He currently serves as academic coordinator at URBAM, the Centre for Urban and Environmental Studies at EAFIT University.

On April 15, 2015, Carlos Cadena Gaitán was chosen along with Australian Parrys Raines, as Future Sustainability Leader in the 2015 version of the award granted by the Danish Think Tank, Sustainia. This prize, awarded for the first time to a Colombian, is among other things, a recognition to his work with the Colombian environmental organization, La Ciudad Verde.
