= Zoopark (band) =

Russian rock band

- Origin: Leningrad, USSR
- Genres: Rock and roll; blues rock; rhythm and blues; garage rock; punk rock
- Years active: 1981–1991
- Members: Mike Naumenko; Aleksandr Khrabunov; Nail Kadyrov; Valery Kirilov
- Past members: Ilya Kulikov; Andrey Danilov; Alexander Donskikh; Andrey Muratov

Zoopark (Russian: Зоопарк) was one of the founding rock groups which began the golden era of rock music in Russia. The group was founded in 1981.

== Background ==
It consisted of singer-songwriter Mike Naumenko, guitarist Aleksandr Khrabunov and a varied group of artists. The first album recorded was All Brothers Are Sisters with Boris Grebenshchikov in 1978. They recorded on the banks of the Neva River in Leningrad (now Saint Petersburg) with a "choir" of drunken friends and colleagues playing percussion on metal cans. Naumenko was a rock outcast, concentrating his work on electrified hard-core blues, although his Russian-language poetic songwriting made him a favorite in the hippie underground. His inspirations included Lou Reed, Bob Dylan, T. Rex, B.B. King and Chuck Berry.

== Legacy ==
Naumenko died in 1991, cutting his career short. He remains celebrated, however, as a pioneer of Russian rock music, with his birthday observed in St. Petersburg clubs, along with numerous creative tributes, including a 2009 novel and a "blues opera" that premiered in 2011. A collection of Naumenko's complete written works—including his samizdat translation of Richard Bach's Illusions—was being prepared for publication in 2015.

== Discography ==
- 1981: Blues de Moscou
- 1983: Small Town Called N (Уездный город N)
- 1984: White Stripe (Белая полоса)
- 1985: Life in the Zoo (Жизнь в Зоопарке)
- 1987: W
- 1987: Illusions (Иллюзии)
- 1991: Soundtrack for the movie (Музыка для фильма)
