= Eva Cadena =

Mexican politician

Eva Cadena Sandoval is a Mexican politician that belonged to the MORENA party. She gained national infamy when hidden videos were released of her taking money that she alleged was for party funding. She subsequently became known on social media as La Recaudadora (The Collector).

== Early life ==
Cadena was born in Tlalmanalco, Estado de México, and moved to Las Choapas, Veracruz, at age 7.

== Career ==
Cadena Sandoval began her career with a short-lived step by the ranks of the PRI in the early 2000s, but was expelled for not covering her quotas and began to perform political work in the ranks of (PAN) National Action alongside Antonio Pouchoulen and Renato Tronco, from 2005 to 2013.

With Morena, at 2016 she was a deputy in the state congress of Veracruz. She was a candidate for the mayorship of Las Choapas, but her candidacy was revoked by the party following the scandal of the hidden videos.

== Scandal ==
A first video, published on April 24, 2017, shows Cadena taking $500,000 Mexican pesos from a woman whose face is not visible, with the money supposedly going to MORENA leader Andrés Manuel López Obrador. In regards to this video, López Obrador said it was a "trick" released to slander and politically destroy the party. Cadena claimed López Obrador did not know about the money and that she returned all of it.

A second video, published on April 27, 2017, shows Cadena taking from the same woman $10,000 US dollars and $50,000 Mexican pesos, supposedly "for her campaign". The woman offers an additional $5,000,000 pesos for López Obrador but would like to meet him in person, to which Cadena responds that she will tell "them". She claimed this video was recorded when she went to return the money.

The videos were leaked to the national newspaper El Universal which subsequently published them. In an interview with the newspaper, Cadena claimed that the videos were altered and that she had asked the Attorney General of Veracruz to seek security videos from the hotel in which the transactions took place to find those responsible for the hidden videos. The Fiscalía Especializada para la Atención de Delitos Electorales (FEPADE) opened an investigation on Cadena's presumed misconduct.

A third video published by El Universal on May 2, 2017, shows Cadena receiving $1,000,000 pesos from a supposed businessman as payment for her pushing for a favorable law in the Veracruz state congress. The day before the third leak, Cadena stated she would step down to face charges, that the videos were altered and that she would release the names of those involved. The same day the video was released, she failed to attend a scheduled meeting with FEPADE. The actions in the third video may constitute additional crimes that are outside of FEPADE jurisdiction and would require investigation from other agencies.
