= Francisco Páez de la Cadena =

Spanish garden historian (born 1951)

Francisco Páez de la Cadena (born 1951 in Madrid) is a Spanish garden historian. He holds a Ph.D. in Philosophy and is also an Agricultural Engineer specialized in landscape architecture. His Ph. D. thesis deals with the relationship between gardens and philosophical texts of the Renaissance, such as the dialogues of Erasmus' Convivium religiosum, Lipsius' De constantia, or Juan de Mariana's De morte et inmortalitate. He has written several books on gardens and gardening, like Historia de los estilos en jardinería (Istmo, 1982) (A history of the gardening styles), which has become a reference textbook in Spanish for the history of gardens. He's recently published a history of Spanish gardens, Jardines, la belleza cautiva (2008) with photographs by photographer and garden designer Eduardo Mencos. He was a garden history and landscape professor at the University of La Rioja.

He has also written fiction (La derrota más hermosa, Debate, 1985, was awarded the Short Novel Sésamo Prize for 1985), and poetry: Cabos sueltos, Cuadernos de la Granada, 2007). He was an active translator from English from the late-1970s onwards and among his translations into Spanish (more than sixty books) there are novels by V. S. Naipaul (Nobel Prize for Literature 2001), Anthony Burgess, Dashiell Hammett and Raymond Chandler, scientific works by Francis Crick (1962 Nobel Prize in Physiology or Medicine) and Antonio Damasio (Prince of Asturias Award in Science and Technology 2005), and poetry, the so-called "landscape" poems by Cesare Pavese.
