= Cadena 94.9 =

Radio station in Pilar, Buenos Aires, Argentina

Argentina
- Broadcast area: Pilar, Buenos Aires
- Frequency: 94.9 MHz
- Branding: Cadena 94.9

Programming
- Format: Adult contemporary

Ownership
- Owner: Claudio Ponce De León

History
- First air date: 2006

Cadena 94.9 (Spanish: 94.9 Network) is an Argentine radio station broadcasting in the 94.9 mHz from the city of Pilar, Buenos Aires. The station originally was called simply "FM 94.9", but the name was changed when it was bought by the local journalist Claudio Ponce de León. The station programming is almost entirely dedicated to the music (with a great emphasis on the 80s and 90s world pop hits), despite having a very small playlist that repeats itself once and again.

== Programming ==
Hours are UTC-3 (UTC−2 on local Summer).

=== Weekdays ===
- Music (6-7 am)
- Salve Argentina ("Hail Argentina", 7-9 am)
- El primero de la mañana ("The first one of the morning", 9 am-noon)
- Live music (noon-1 pm)
- Vitamina M - El arte de combinar sonidos ("Vitamin M - The art of combining sounds", 1-4 pm)
- Años luz ("Light years", 4-6 pm)
- Lo mejor de "El primero de la mañana" ("The best of 'The first one of the morning'", 6-8 pm)
- Made in Argentina (8-10 pm)
- Music (10 pm-midnight)
- Magic night (midnight-6 am)

=== Saturday ===
- Music (6-10 am)
- La gente y su defensor ("The people and its ombudsman", 9-10 am)
- Music (10 am-2 pm)
- Country 2 Radio (2-3 pm)
- Music (3 pm-midnight)
- Magic night (midnight-6 am)

=== Sunday ===
- Music (6 am-midnight)
- Magic night (midnight-6 am)
