= Margarita Cadenas =

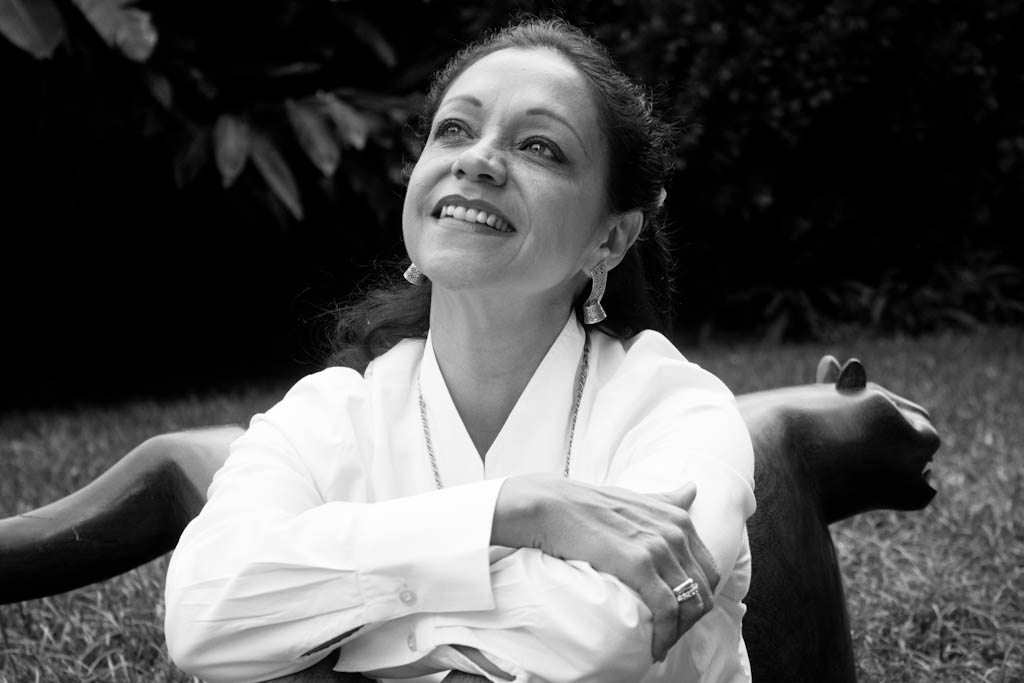
Margarita Cadenas

Margarita Cadenas (Caracas, Venezuela), is a Venezuelan-French director, producer and screenwriter.

== Biography ==
Margarita Cadenas was born in Caracas, Venezuela. After earning her diploma in social communication in the Catholic University «Andres Bello” (1977), very young she quickly started her career as a high-level journalist. She became a reporter for Venezuelan television and wrote for several newspapers. Her talent was spotted and she was asked to present the 20: 30 news for national television Canal 8 (1977–1979). She then went on to interview local political players. She left for Great Britain in 1979 where she specialised in production and directing with the British Council and BBC London. With this experience under her belt, she directed and produced her first work of fiction “Cindy” or a Cinderella turned punk, and a documentary about Venezuela called “Land of Grace”.

She then moved to France in 1982.

Between 1983 and 1986, she was an assistant director at SFP (Societé Française de Production) working with directors like Claude de Givray, Gabriel Axel, Philippe Monnier, Michel Boisrond, Jean-Jacques Goron. After this experience, she co-created her first production company, Alta Mira (1986) They produced shorts films, docs and film ads.

Between 1988 and 1995, she continued her work producing more than 60 Publicity films, shot in South Africa, Argentina, Venezuela, England, Denmark, Spain and France. She worked for various companies like 50/49, Son and Lumière et Movie Box as an executive producer for publicity agencies like Saatchi & Saatchi, Young & Rubicam, Grey, RSCG, Léo Burnett UK, Mc Cann, and title producer for directors like Peter Suschitzky, Eric de La Hosseraye, Costa Kekemenis, Christine Pascal, Jaime de la Peña and Roch Stefanik.

In 1995, she began to produce works of fiction and created the company MC² PRODUCTIONS. In 1996, TF1 broadcast her first television series., “Barrage sur l’Orenoque” This French-Spanish co-production was followed by “Marie et Tom” a French-Canadian co-production in 2000. Meanwhile, she was developing her first feature projects. With MC² Productions she coproduced with Village Roadshow Productions a film by Tassos Boulmetis entitled “A touch of spice” (2003). She produced for the French Television "Chuao, la vallée merveilleuse" (2006) by H. Becerra and G. Jacquemin.

Her career as an auteur also got started when co-wrote her first television series "Barrage sur L’Orénoque” (1996) and as director with the documentary “Au-delà des apparences" on the controversial anthropologist Jacques Lizot which she also wrote and produced.

She went back to her native country in 2007 and started to publish articles and pictures in her page History and Voyages in the Daily “El Expreso”.

Writer, Producer and Director of the short films “Mascaras” (2009) featured in the Cines Unidos Circuit in Venezuela.

Writer, producer and director of the Documentary “Macondo” (2009) : about the living house of Miguel Otero Silva, a famous writer, poet, and owner of the daily journal “El Nacional”, an icon of journalism in Venezuela and Maria Teresa Castillo, a fighter for women’s rights.

After an expedition to the Amazon that she organised for a book to be published on the mythology of the Yanomami Indians, she wrote the long feature film “Cenizas Eternas” which she has also produced and directed (2011). Theatrical release in Cines Unidos in all cities of Venezuela on 9 December 2011 to 23 March 2012. Audience Award II Dones i Cinema Art Festival, Valencia, Spain 2012 Price Best Sound Track at XXVII Latin American Festival Trieste, Italy 2012 Nominated in the Competition World's Best First Film of the Official Selection of the XXXV World Film Festival in Montreal, Canada 2011 Official Selection at the Festival Les Reflets du Cinema Iberian Villeurbanne, France 2012 Nominated Best Film in National Competition at the Festival de Cine Venezolano in Mérida, Venezuela 2012 Presented at the Festival of Films Present, Martigny, Switzerland 2012 Biennale of Contemporary Art Marcigny, France 2012

== Filmography ==
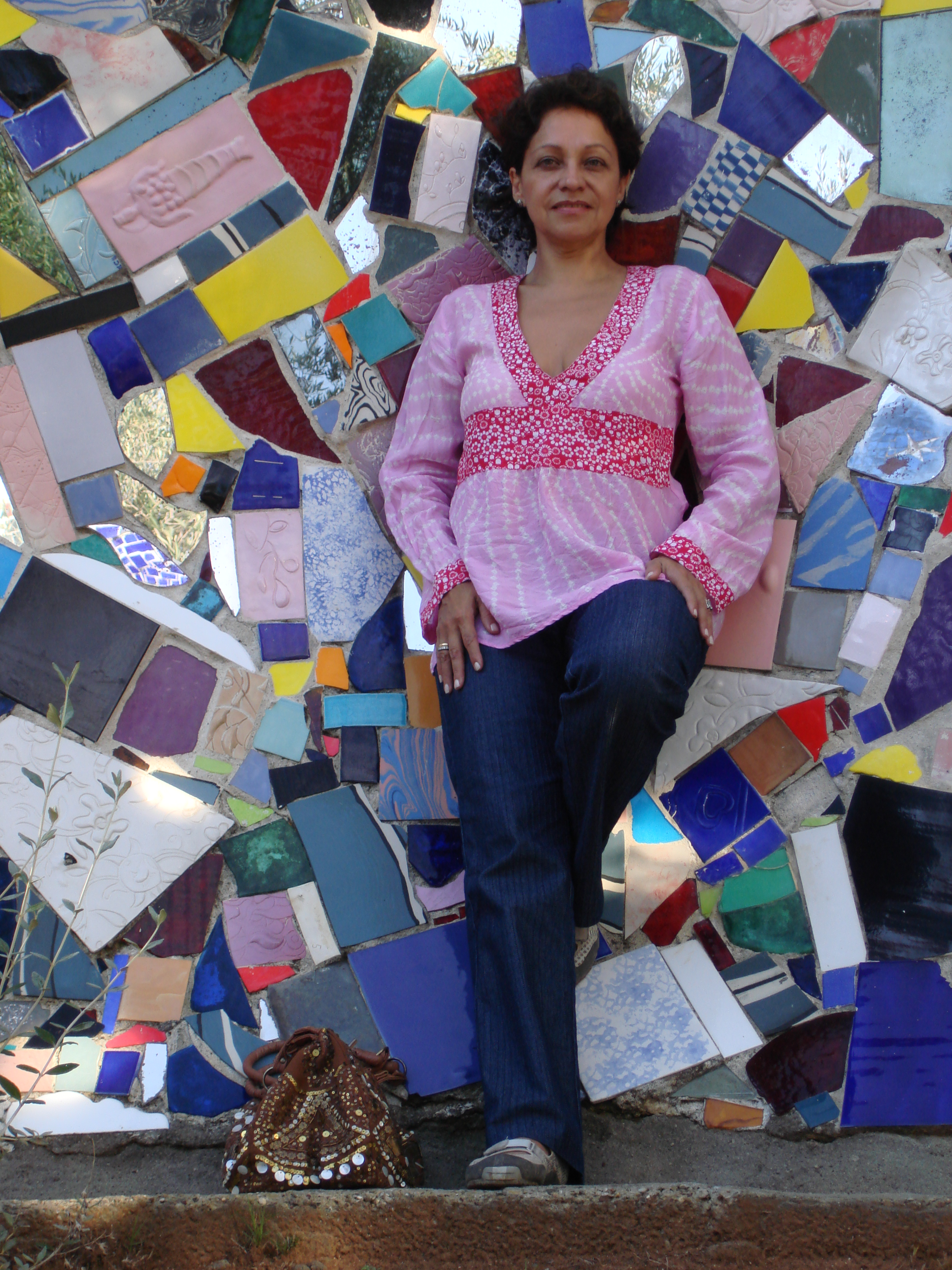

=== Dam on the Orinoco (1996) ===
Written and produced by Margarita Cadenas in 1996, tells the story of a French engineer, who arrives in Venezuela to work on the construction of a dam on the Orinoco River. She is involved in various situations, many of which are particularly linked to the environment. During her struggle, she meets a Franco-Venezuelan adventurer who lives with a love story.

=== Beyond appearances (1996) ===
Written and directed by Margarita Cadenas, led by MC ² Productions in conjunction with RCTV, Cinesens and A. Kerjean. Based on the different schools of anthropology and the passion of anthropologists by the Yanomami Indians, from the sixties, this documentary lets us go to meet Jacques Lizot since its arrival in the Venezuelan Amazon, in 1968, where he lived most of twenty years until his return to his country of origin France.

=== Mary and Tom (2000) ===
Produced by MC ² Productions in conjunction with RDV Productions, TF1 and Téléfictions Canada. It tells the story of a woman of extremely small stature that leaves France to go to work in Canada and start a new life. There found a rich young man, heir to a great fortune, in whose hand is love. It was distributed in 2002 in France, Canada, Belgium, Switzerland and Africa.

=== A touch of Spice (2003) ===
It is a bitter-sweet comedy and nostalgic about the awakening that occurs to leave the country of origin, and, more importantly, shows how the kitchen can give us a valuable lesson about life itself. It was written and directed by Tassos Boulmetis and produced, Village Roadshow Productions (Australian company producing films such as The Matrix, Analyze This, Training Day, Mystic River, Happy Feet, among many others) and Smallridge International ANS. Margarita Cadenas worked as an associated producer for Roadshow Productions. t was distributed in Europe, Latin America, United States, Canada, Australia. Awards in the 44e International Festival of Thessaloniki: Best Film, Best Director (Tassos Boulmetis), Best Screenplay (Tassos Boulmetis), Best Cinematography (Takis Zervoulakos), Best Set (Olga Leontiadou), Best Music (Evanthia Reboutsika), Best Sound (Dimitris Athanassopoulos), Best Editing (Giorgos Mavropsaridis) Award Dewars of the public to the best Greek film. Special Award of Excellence from the Association of Film and Television Technicians Greeks.

=== Chuao, Grand Valley (2006) ===
Produced by Margarita Cadenas, under the direction of Hamilton Becerra and Gaël Jacquemin. Chuao, a small Venezuelan town, nestled between mountains and sea. The inhabitants of this place are the direct descendants of African slaves brought over three centuries ago by Spanish colonists to grow cocoa. They manufactured today, totally organic and artisan, the world's best cacao. Currently, the project of a highway that would link to Chuao with the rest of the country, concerned about its inhabitants.

=== Masks (2009) ===
Written, directed and produced by Margarita Cadenas, is a series of four short films of 75 seconds each. The concept of each of the shorts is to give a first impression that invites you to discover that behind every story.

=== Macondo (2009) ===
Written, directed and produced by Margarita Cadenas

Macondo was a place of universal dimension, without a doubt! In a few weeks, Macondo was torn down: the marvelous place and the surrounding vegetation. But not the ideas that saw life there nor the capacity of the reflections.

Macondo represented, above all, friendship, freedom, creation and beauty, the beauty of emotion, the spirit, human beauty...

Oblivion is not the victory over wrong, nor is it victory over nothing. If it is a veiled way of laughing at history, the memory remains....

=== Eternal Ashes (2011) ===
Eternal Ashes tells the story of a mother, Ana, and her daughter, Elena. Although they are separated, in the space and time, they remain united forever. Written, directed and produced by Margarita Cadenas.

Theatrical release in Cines Unidos in all cities of Venezuela on 9 December 2011 to 23 March 2012.

Audience Award II Dones i Cinema Art Festival, Valencia, Spain 2012

Price Best Sound Track at XXVII Latin American Festival Trieste, Italy 2012

Nominated in the Competition World's Best First Film of the Official Selection of the XXXV World Film Festival in Montreal, Canada 2011

Official Selection at the Festival Les Reflets du Cinema Iberian Villeurbanne, France 2012

Nominated Best Film in National Competition at the Festival de Cine Venezolano in Mérida, Venezuela 2012

Presented at the Festival of Films Present, Martigny, Switzerland 2012

Biennale of Contemporary Art Marcigny, France 2012

Festival d’Auray (France) - 2012

Festival des spiritualties – Puerto Ordaz (Venezuela) - 2012

6ème Festival Cinema del Mar – Punta del Este (Uruguay) – 2013

Festival Your Kontinent – Richmond (United States) - 2013

XVII Boston Ibero-American Film Festival ( United States) - 2013

=== Women of the Venezuelan Chaos (Mujeres del Caos venezolano) (2017) ===
Five Venezuelan women, from different backgrounds and generations, draw a portrait of their collapsing country facing possibly its worst social, economic, political and humanitarian chaos in its 200-year-history.

- Festival des Libertés Bruxelles, Belgique, 18- 27 octobre 2018

- Festival International du Film des Droits Humains de Guadeloupe, 12 au 19 Octobre 2018

Prix de La Ligue des Droits de L’Homme Meilleur Documentaire 2018

- Human Rights Film Festival, Berlin, Germany; September 20-2, 2018

- 5º festival Internacional de Cine por Los Derechos Humanos, Bogotá Colombia; August 10–16, 2018

Honourable Mention Prize from the jury

- 13th Festival de Cinema Latino-Americano São Paulo, Brazil; July 25 - August 1, 2018

- Assemblée nationale de la République Française - National Assembly of the French Republic, Paris, France; July 5, 2018

- 30th Galway Film Fleadh, Galway, Ireland; July 10–15, 2018

Winner Best Human Rights Feature

- 29th New York Human Rights Watch Film Festival New York, United States; 14–21 June 2018

- 15th Hot Docs Canadian International Documentary Film Festival, Toronto, Canada; April – Mai 2018

- European Parliament One World in Brussels Brussels, Belgium; April 2018

- 11th Lichter Filmfest Frankfurt International Frankfurt, Germany; April 2018

Winner Audience Award Best Film

-18th Movies That Matter Festival The Hague, Netherlands; March 24–31, 2018

- 15th CPH:DOX Copenhagen International Documentary Festival, Copenhagen, Denmark; March 15–23, 2018

- 16e Festival du Film et Forum International sur les Droits Humains Genève, Suisse; March 9–18, 2018

- 21st London Human Rights Watch Film Festival London, United Kingdom; March 7–16, 2018

- 20th One World International Human Rights Documentary Film Festival Prague, Czech Republic; March 5–14, 2018

- 37e Festival International du Film d’Amiens France; November 2017
