= Estero La Cadena =

River in Chile

Coordinates: 34°11′S 70°50′W

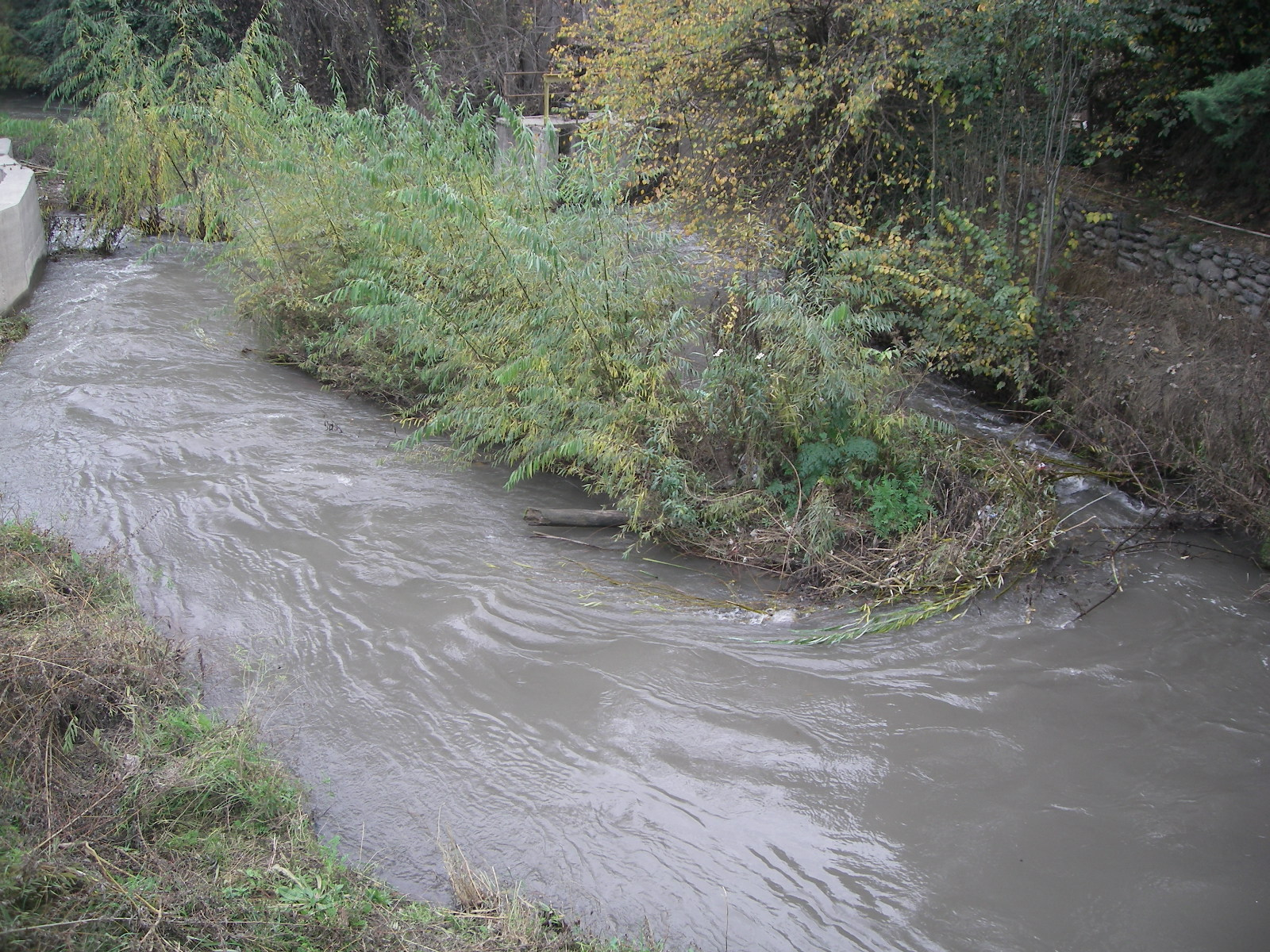

Location
- Country: Chile

The Estero La Cadena is a river of Chile.

== See also ==
- List of rivers of Chile
