= Mikhail Kollontay =

- Born: 21 August 1952 (age 73); Moscow, Russia USSR
- Occupations: Composer, Pianist
- Instrument: Piano
- Years active: 1971—present
- Website: www.kollontay.org

Mikhail Georgiyevich Kollontay (Russian: Михаи́л Гео́ргиевич Коллонта́й; born 21 August 1952 in Moscow) is a Russian composer and pianist. He is also known under his mother's last name as Mikhail Ermolaev.

== Early life ==
His father, Georgiy Fyodorovich Kollontay (1897–1954), an artist, was sent to the camps in 1938 (released in 1946, rehabilitated posthumously); his mother, Ekaterina Ilyinichna Ermolaeva (1922–2001), was a translator (English, modern Greek).

In 1971 graduated from the Music College attached to the Moscow Conservatory with a double major in piano and in theory/composition. In 1977 received his diploma in piano from the Moscow Conservatory, studying under Professor V. V. Gornostayeva; continued as her assistant in 1979. In 1978 earned his diploma in composition under Professor A. S. Leman.

== Career ==
From 1979 member of the Union of Composers of the USSR (RF). Between 1979 and 2003 taught at the Moscow Conservatory (intermittently; first as an assistant to V. Gornostayeva; from 1982 as a faculty member), and, from 1989 to 1991, at the Gnessin Musical Pedagogical Institute (special piano). Beginning in 1991, performed various duties at Moscow churches (altar server, choir singer, guard).

From 2003 until 2024, he was a professor (piano) at Tainan National University of the Arts (Taiwan, ROC.). In 2022, Kollontay became citizen of Republic of China.

== Composition ==
Kollontay's artistic style was formed under the influence of Russian Church music (from childhood sang in church choirs), the tradition of liturgical reading, the culture of early Russian singing and folklore (worked in the folk music department of the Moscow Conservatory; went on folklore expeditions). All this contributed to the liberation his intonation and his rhythmic, modal and compositional thinking, and to the formation of his own individual style.

Mariinsky Theatre performed The Captain’s Daughter opera by Kollontay in a concert version in 2016 for the first time.

=== Selected works ===
- op. 73 Third concerto for piano and orchestra (2024)
- op. 71 Seventh symphony, for full symphony orchestra (2021-2023)
- op. 67 Sixth symphony, for full symphony orchestra (2019-2021)
- op. 64 Fifth symphony, for full symphony orchestra (2017-2018)
- op. 63 Moments musicaux for piano (2015-2018)
- op. 61 Violin Concerto (Blue Ray) (2011—2012)
- op. 60 Fourth symphony (Uncompleted), for full symphony orchestra (2010—2011)
- op. 59 To the New Martyrology, five compositions for organ (2009—2010)
- op. 58 Ivan for bass and six trumpets (2009)
- op. 56 Pages Torn from a Book of Confessions for wind quintet (2007—)
- op. 55 Etudes for piano (2006—2007)
- op. 54 The Lord’s Day for full symphony orchestra (2005—2006)
- op. 53 Selected Exapostilaria and Photagogika for monophonic performance (2004—)
- op. 52 Eight Odes for cello (2003—2004)
- op. 51 Idyll for Celtic harp (2004)
- op. 50 The House of the Lord, oratorio for male chorus, string orchestra with organ ad libitum, violin and reader on biblical texts (Book of Isaiah) (2004)
- op. 50 bis Prophecy for contrabass accompanied by six contrabasses (2004)
- op. 48a Agnus Dei for violin and full symphony orchestra (2000—2001)
- op. 47 Two Prayers for soprano and piano (2000):

No 1 from the Menaion: 22 February
No 2 from the Book of Job, 42 (Moisey Rizhsky’s and Synodal translations)

- op. 46 Feast for mezzo-soprano, bass, ballet or pantomime and 15 performers on texts from Menander’s comedy The Grumbler (2000)
- op. 45 Second concerto for piano and orchestra (2008—2009; 2011)
- op. 44 The Captain’s Daughter, scenes of Russian life based on A.S. Pushkin's novel (opera) (1995–1998)
- op. 42 Edited version of A. Dargomyzhskiy’s opera The Stone Guest (produced in 1996, Klagenfurt, Austria)
- op. 41 Let This Cup Pass from Us, Russian military Requiem for mixed chorus, symphony orchestra with organ, cello, soprano and bass solo on texts from Eastern Orthodox Church services (1994—1995; 2019)
- op. 39 Cadenzas for W.A. Mozart’s Piano concerto in D major, KV 537 (1994)
- op. 38 Cadenza for the first movement of W.A. Mozart's Piano concerto in A, KV 448 (1993—1994)
- op. 37 Cadenza for the first movement of L. van Beethoven’s Violin concerto op. 61 (1993)
- op. 36 Children’s Songs, arrangement from Tchaikovsky’s 16 Songs for Older Children on words by A. Pleshcheyev and K. Aksakov (op. 54 Nos. 35, 7—10, 13, 14, 16) for children's chorus and soprano or tenor solo accompanied by string orchestra with French horn and additional children's chorus (1989)
- op. 35 The Feelings of an Evil-doer on Christmas Eve for cello and piano (1994)
- op. 34a Ten Caprices on the Destruction of a Temple for violin (1994)
- op. 34b Lament on the Fall of Saints for English horn and string quintet (1994)
- op. 33 Ode of a Traitor for flute and organ (1993)
- op. 32 Ten Words by Mussorgsky on the Death of Victor Hartmann for piano trio (1993)
- op. 32bis Deborah for soprano and piano trio on a biblical text (Book of Judges, 4-5) (1998)
- op. 31 Trumpet of Death for organ (1993)
- op. 30 Partita-Testament for violin (1993)
- op. 29 Blessed Citizens of the Heavenly Kingdom, 9 preludes for piano (1992)
- op. 28 Six Biblical sonatas for violin and organ (1992)
- op. 27 Play about Ten Lepers for mixed chorus, children's chorus, 10 soloists and oboe (1991)
- op. 25a Catechism, Third A symphony for full symphony orchestra (1987—1990)
- op. 25b-I The Works of the Life, Third B symphony for full symphony orchestra, book 1: Endysis (2012—2014)
- op. 25b-II The Works of the Life, Third B symphony for full symphony orchestra, book 2: Kerygma. The Hell (2014—2015)
- op. 25b-III The Works of the Life, Third B symphony for full symphony orchestra, book 3: Diabasis (2015—2017)
- op. 24 Diptych for children's chorus and piano on words by E. Baratynsky (1974; 1988)
- op. 22 Praise to the Most Holy Mother of God, 14 hymns (Second string quartet) (1988)
- op. 21a Prolegomena, light pieces for piano (2014)
- op. 20 Trio-Symphony for organ (1986)
- op. 20 bis With an Order for Fresh Horses for Official Business for tenor and organ on words by M. Lermontov (1987—1988)
- op. 19b To the Dark Estuary, concerto for voice and chamber orchestra on words by M. Lermontov and N. Roubtsov (1979—1986)
- op. 15 Beneath the Shade of the Bird Cherry Trees and the Acacias, small cantata for children's chorus and string orchestra with solo flute on words by K. Batyushkov (1984)
- op. 14a Sonata for solo violin (from Psalm 17) (1978; 1980)
- op. 14c Two Hymns and the Dance of King David for 11 performers (1991)
- op. 8 Concerto for viola and orchestra (1979—1980)
- op. 7 Eight Psalms Sonata for viola solo (1977)
- op. 4 Four Little Summer Country Pictures for piano (1975)
- op. 3 Eight Spiritual Symphonies for 3 violins, 3 violas and 3 cellos (1974–1975)
- op. 2bis Seven Romantic Ballades for piano (1999—2000)
- op. 1 Country Choruses for large mixed chorus and six soloists on words from Russian folk songs (1971—1973)

== Recordings ==
=== On LPs ===
- “Four Little Summer Country Pictures” for piano, op. 4 // Melodiya, 1980, “Young Moscow Composers perform their works.” C 10-15221-2. Performed by Mikhail Ermolaev (Kollontay) (piano)
- “From the Poetry of Ancient Egypt.” Five romances for soprano and harp, op. 18 // Melodiya, 1982, “Vocal works of young Moscow composers.” C 10-17371-2. Performed by Galina Pisarenko (soprano) and Olga Erdely (harp)
- Scherzino for piano, op. 11 // Melodiya, 1982, “Seventh International Tchaikovsky Piano Competition, Piano.” C 10-18099-100. Performed by Mikhail Ermolaev (Kollontay) (piano)
- Concerto for viola and orchestra, op. 8 // Melodiya, 1983, C 10-19429-007. Performed by Yury Bashmet (viola) and the Bolshoi Symphony Orchestra conducted by Vladimir Fedoseyev
- “Plantain”. Nine poems by Nikolay Rubtsov for bass and piano, op. 10 // Melodiya, 1989, “Young composers of the RSFSR.” C 10-28543-000. Performed by Mikhail Kroutikov (Svetlov) and Mikhail Ermolaev (Kollontay) (piano)
- “Beneath the Shade of the Bird Cherry Trees and the Acacias”, small cantata, op. 15 // Melodiya, 1987, C 50-26103-001. Performed by “Vesna” children's chorus and the instrumental ensemble of the Lithuanian State Chamber Orchestra conducted by Alexander Ponomaryov

=== On CDs ===
- “Ten Words by Mussorgsky on the Death of Victor Hartmann” for piano trio, op. 32:
  - EXTRAPLATTE EX 408-2, Austria, 1993. Performed by Elena Denisova (violin), Joseph Podgoransky (cello), Alexei Kornienko (piano)
  - DEKA media DMCD014. Performed by Elena Denisova (violin), Joseph Podgoransky (cello), Alexei Kornienko (piano) (reedition)
- Caprice No. 7 from “Ten Caprices on the Destruction of a Temple” for violin, op. 34a // Elena Denisova: 13 Capricen, Co-Production Bayerischer Rundfunk / Talking Music 1005; Germany, 1996. Performed by Elena Denisova (violin)
- “Eight Spiritual Symphonies”, op. 3 (six symphonies) // Russian Disc. RD CD 10 004, US – Canada, 1996. Performed by soloists’ ensemble “Northern Crown,” Igor Zaydenshnir
- Concerto for viola and orchestra, op. 8 // FPRK Kuenstlerleben Foundation. Relief CR 991064, Switzerland, 1999. Performed by Yuri Bashmet (viola), Vladimir Fedoseev (conductor)
- “Partita-Testament” for violin, op. 30:
  - Etcetera Record Company B.V. KTC 1236, Austria, 2000. Performed by Elena Denisova (violin)
  - DEKA media DMCD009, 2015. Performed by Elena Denisova (violin) (reedition)
- “Children’s Songs” (arrangement from Tchaikovsky's “16 Songs for Children,” op. 36) // The Seasons. Magic Classics Series. Performed by “The Seasons of the Year” chamber orchestra, conductor V. Boulakhov; “Zviozdny” children's chorus, artistic director and conductor Raisa Mogilevskaya; Elena Voznesenskaya (soprano)
- “Blessed Citizens of the Heavenly Kingdom,” op. 29 // SteepleChase Productions ApS. Kontrapunkt 32339, Denmark, 2008. Performed by Mikhail Kollontay (piano)
- “Six Biblical sonatas,” op. 28 // SteepleChase Productions ApS. Kontrapunkt 32339, Denmark, 2008. Performed by Elena Denisova (violin), Jens E. Christensen (organ)
- “Seven Romantic Ballads”, op. 2bis:
  - Ars Production, Schumacher, ARS 38484, Germany, 2008. Performed by Elena Kuschnerova (piano)
  - Classical Records, CR 123, Russia, 2009. Performed by Irina Chukovskaya (piano)
  - (two ballads) La musique russe du XIXe au XXIe siècle – University Laval, 2008. Performed by Irina Chukovskaya (piano)
- “Agnus Dei” for violin and symphony orchestra, op. 48a // Classical Records, CR 149, Russia, 2012. Performed by Elena Denisova (violin), Moscow Radio and TV Orchestra, Alexei Kornienko (conductor)
- “Ten Caprices on Destroying of the Temple” for violin, op. 34a // Classical Records, CR 149, Russia, 2012. Performed by Elena Denisova (violin)
- “The Day of the Lord” for symphony orchestra, op. 54 // Classical Records, CR 149, Russia, 2012. Performed by Moscow Radio and TV Orchestra, Alexei Kornienko (conductor)
- Piano Concerto No. 2, op. 45 // Major, 2015. Performed by Elena Kuschnerova (piano), Moscow Radio and TV Orchestra, Mikhail Kollontay (conductor)
- Violin Concerto 'Blue Ray', op. 61 // 2017 TYXart, Germany, TXA 17093. Performed by Elena Denisova (violin), Moscow Radio and TV Orchestra, Alexei Kornienko (conductor)
- Viola Concerto, op. 8 // 2019 TYXart, Germany, TXA 19129. Performed by Nai-Yueh Chang (viola), Moscow Radio and TV Orchestra, Alexei Kornienko (conductor)
- Piano Concerto No. 1 'White', op. 13 // 2019 TYXart, Germany, TXA 19129. Performed by Alexei Kornienko (piano), Moscow Radio and TV Orchestra, Mikhail Kollontay (conductor)

=== Digital edition ===
- Symphony No. 3B The Heart of Life in three books, op. 25b. Melodiya MEL CO 1169, 2024. Moscow Radio and TV Symphony Orchestra, Mikhail Kollontay (conductor)

== Musical organizational activities ==
In 1989—1993 he organized and headed the Creative Heritage Commission at the Union of Moscow Composers, which was engaged in preserving the archives of Moscow composers (among those saved are the archives of M. Raukhverger, M. Magidenko, N. Rakov, A. Balashov). Initiated the “Heritage” musical meetings (1990) and chaired the organizing committee. Prepared and presented the 15-hour broadcasts, “The Day of M.I. Glinka’s Music” and “The Day of A.S. Dargomyzhsky’s Music,” “Orpheus” radio station programmes on S.I. Taneyev, G. Enescu, E.G. Gilels, M.A. Balakirev, V.B. Dovgan, N.N. Chargeishvili, A.S. Karamanov, Yu.M. Butsko, and others.

Compiler, editor and author of the introduction and comments to the edition: M. Glinka. Piano Compositions / Russian Piano Music, 2. Moscow: “Muzyka,” 1987 (under the pseudonym E. Nosenko).

== Awards ==
- Best accompanist Award at the Glinka All-Union Singers’ Competition in Tallinn (1979)
- First Prize at the All-Union Piano Competition (1981, Tashkent)
- D.D. Shostakovich Prize (for Viola concerto, 1981)
- Diploma at the 7th International Tchaikovsky Piano Competition (1982; also awarded the Special Prize for performing Tchaikovsky's compositions).
