= Freddy Cadena =

Ecuadorian conductor (born 1963)

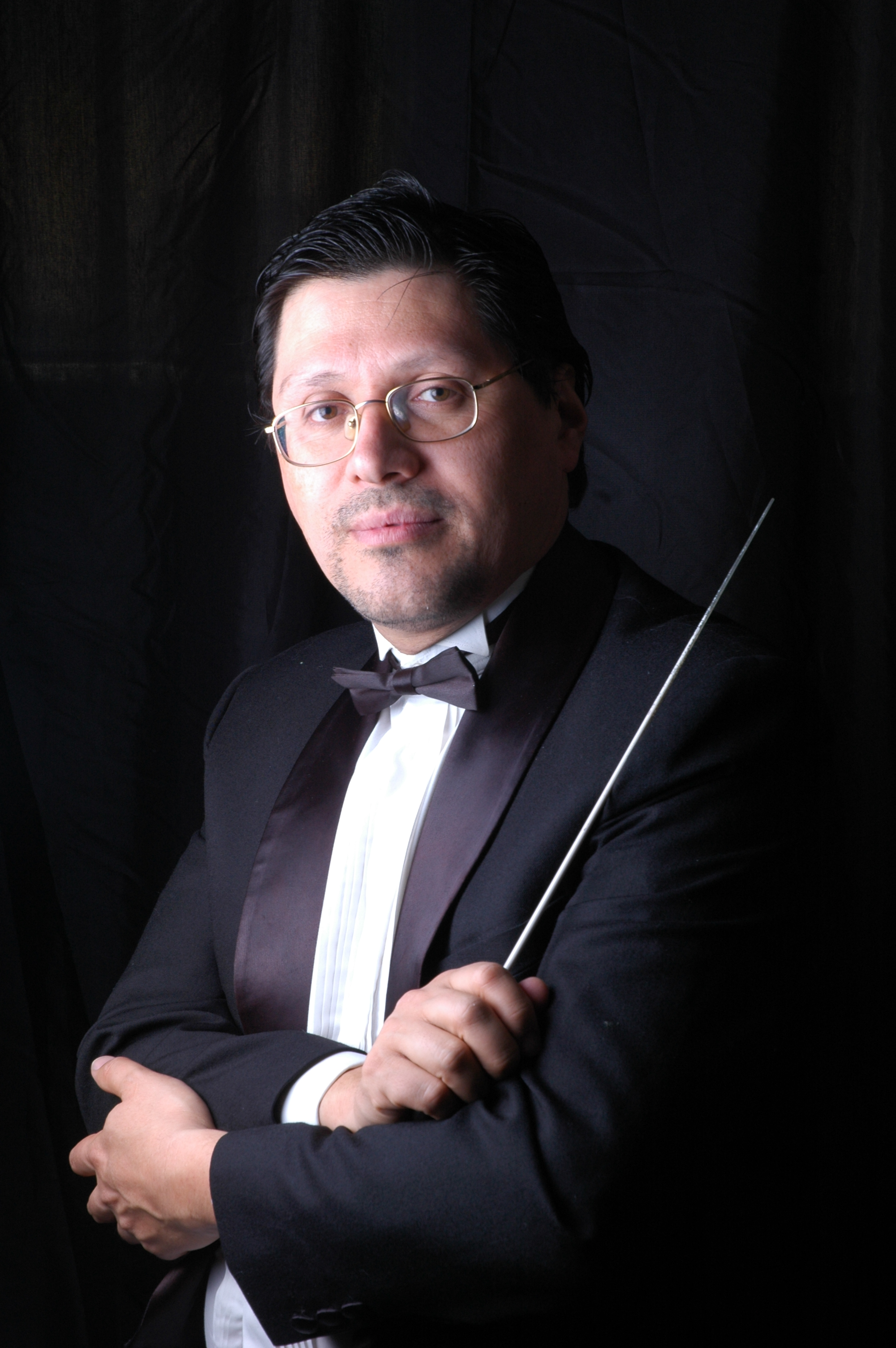
Image of Freddy Cadena

Freddy Cadena (born 1963) is an Ecuadorian orchestral conductor. He lives in Russia. From 2000 to 2006 he taught at Moscow Conservatory. He is a founder and a chief conductor of Amadeus Chamber Orchestra of Moscow Composers' Union.

== Education ==
Freddy Cadena began his musical studies at Quito National Conservatory. In 1988, already a conductor, he entered Tchaikovsky Conservatory of Moscow where he studied with Leonid Nikolaev. He also took part in the master classes given by Helmuth Rilling, and was invited to conduct the Bach-Collegium Stuttgart and the Gächinger Kantorei at Music Festivals in Germany and Spain. In 1994 he graduated from the Tchaikovsky Conservatory, obtaining a diploma with Summa cum laude. Upon his graduation he has praised for his innate qualities: real musicality and respectful contact, as well as exacting discipline over the musicians"

== Career ==
Freddy Cadena has conducted Moscow Conservatory Opera Studio Orchestra (operas such as Don Giovanni by Mozart and La Traviata by G. Verdi); the Defense Department Orchestra and the Yurlov State Academy Capella (A German Requiem by J. Brahms and Mass of Glory by G. Puccini), and the choir "Spiritual Renaissance" from the Schnittke Institute. He also collaborated with Aragon Symphony Band. "...Freddy Cadena has left an unforgettable impression..." His performances have taken place in major concert halls in Moscow and abroad. He has worked with Russian artists such as Irina Arkhipova and Vladimir Krainev.

From 1992 to 2000 he was giving conducting masterclasses at summer courses in Aragón, Spain. Since 1994, he regularly participated in Moscow Autumn International Contemporary Music Festival, where he gave several premieres of the works by contemporary Russian and foreign composers. He has also participated in festivals like Russian Music Scene, Glinka International Festival in Smolensk, Japan's Sou in Japan, Ibero American Culture Festival (commemorative concert for the Ecuadoran composer Luis Humberto Salgado's centenary). From 2000 to 2006 he worked at Tchaikovsky Conservatory of Moscow as a conductor and master at the Opera Chair, becoming the first foreign teacher who gave lessons there.

Since 2005 he has been invited to conduct the orchestra at Moscow Satire Theatre, in shows: Andriusha, We still laugh, Krechinsky wedding, Levsha, Liberty for love. Currently he collaborates with the Spanish publishing house Periferia Sheet Music, being its representative in the Russian Federation.

He is a creator and a chief conductor of Amadeus Chamber Orchestra of Moscow Composers' Union, since its foundation in 1995. This orchestra has made recordings, and toured throughout Russia, Spain, Belgium and France. In 1998 the orchestra participated in the First international festival of pulsed string in Asturias (Spain). Amadeus Chamber Orchestra has performed more than 150 world premieres of works by Russian, European, Japanese, North American and Latin American composers.

As a guest conductor he worked with the three major orchestras in Ecuador: National Symphony Orchestra, Guayaquil Symphony Orchestra and Cuenca Symphony Orchestra, and was hailed as "...A professional with a lot of strength …"

== Appraisal, comments, and honors ==
"...His passionate nature, delicate taste, on-stage charm, and the magic of his gesture brought the success of this night to the young conductor Freddy Cadena "

"Mozart is the best evidence for the quality of a musician, and the soloists ensemble of the Defense Department Orchestra, conducted by Freddy Cadena’s baton, unquestionably proved this quality."

For his active participation and contribution to the prestigious Moscow Autumn International Contemporary Music Festival, Freddy Cadena was awarded a Gold Medal, on a par with such artists as Gennady Rozhdestvensky, Valery Polyansky, Vladimir Ponkin and Vladimir Fedoseyev. Moscow, 2008.
