= Susman Kiselgof =

Russian-Jewish folksong collector (1878–1939)

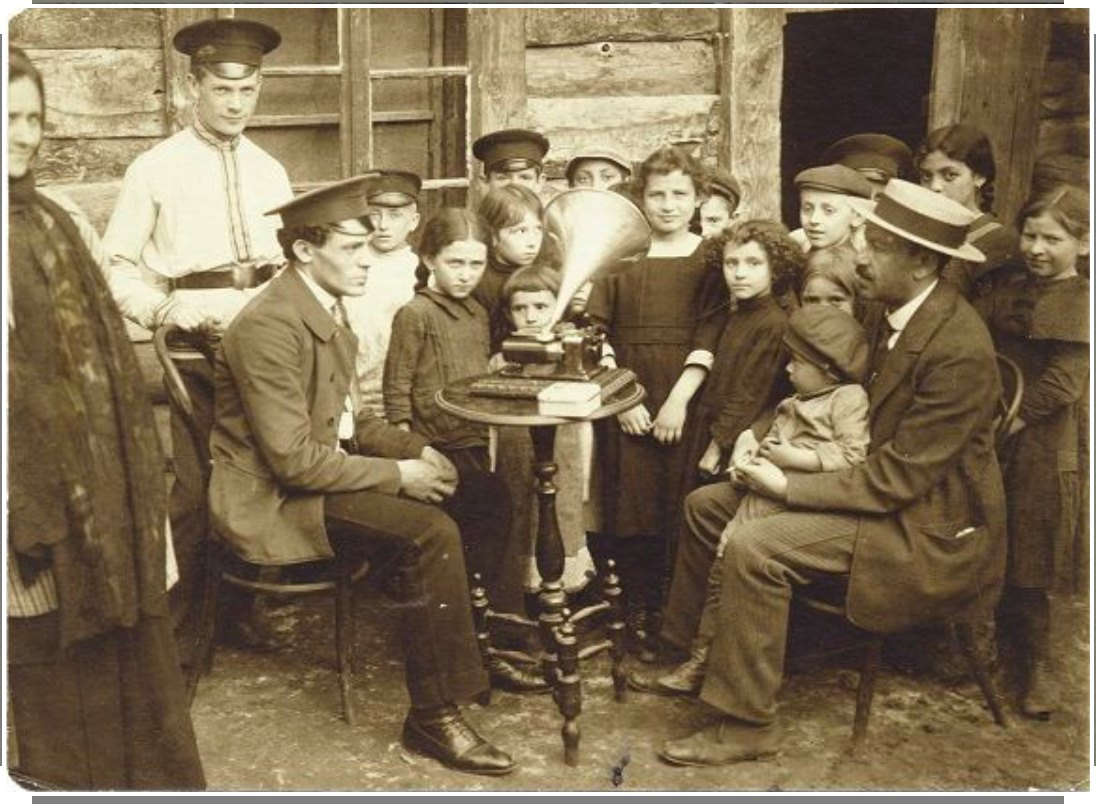
Z. Kiselgof (seated on the right), in Kremenets, 1912

Susman (Zinoviy Aronovich) Kiselgof (Зусман Аронович Кисельгоф, זוסמאַן קיסעלהאָף Zusman Kiselhof; 1878–1939) was a Russian-Jewish folksong collector and pedagogue associated with the Society for Jewish Folk Music in St. Petersburg. Like his contemporary Joel Engel, he conducted fieldwork in the Russian Empire to collect Jewish religious and secular music. Materials he collected were used in the compositions of such figures as Joseph Achron, Lev Pulver, and Alexander Krein.

== Biography ==
Kiselgof was born in Velizh, Vitebsk Governorate, Russian Empire, on March 15, 1878 (March 3 by the Julian Calendar then in use). He was the son of a Melamed. He studied at a Cheder and then at the Velizh Jewish College and at the Vilna Jewish Teacher's College in 1894. He never received a full musical education, but showed a natural ability to perceive pitch and learn new instruments. At age 11 he took violin lessons from a klezmer named Meir Berson, but was otherwise mostly self-taught. He began his efforts to collect Jewish folk music around 1902. He also became a member of the General Jewish Labour Bund and became involved in its educational efforts for some years, apparently from 1898 to either 1906 or 1908. He may have spent at least a few weeks in prison in 1899 for possession of illegal literature.

After teaching at various institutions in Vitebsk, Kiselgof relocated to Saint Petersburg in 1906, where he became a teacher in the school of the Society for the Promotion of Culture among the Jews of Russia and a choir conductor. In 1908 he married his wife Guta Grigorievna. He continued his efforts to document and research Jewish folklore; from 1907 to 1915 he made annual summer expeditions to the Pale of Settlement, during which he recorded more than 2000 Jewish folk songs and tunes. His trip in 1907 was to Mogilev Governorate to the center of Chabad Hasidism. In 1913-14 he participated in the Jewish Ethnographic Expedition of S. An-sky. He also became very active in Jewish cultural life in St. Petersburg; in 1908, he was a founding member of the Society for Jewish Folk Music, and was on its board until 1921. In that group, he worked with such figures as Lazare Saminsky, Mikhail Gnessin, Solomon Rosowsky, and Pavel Lvov. And 1909, he was involved in fundraising efforts to create a new Jewish theatre in the city. He also became a friend and tutor to Jascha Heifetz during this time.

In 1911, he published his best-known songbook Lider-zamelbukh far der yidishe shul un familie (Song collection for the Jewish school and family), a collection of roughly 90 songs in choral arrangement with piano. These included secular and religious Yiddish songs and wordless Nigunim. It was reprinted several times; the 1923 reprint is available in digital format in the collection of the Yiddish Book Center.

In the early period of the Soviet Union, Kiselgof continued along the same music and education path he had already been on. In 1919, he became the musical consultant, teacher and choirmaster for the newly founded Petrograd Jewish Theater Studio of Alexei Granovsky (later known as GOSET). In 1920 he became director of National Jewish School No.11 and Children's Home No.78 in Leningrad. His wax cylinder recordings were transferred from the Jewish Ethnographic Museum in St. Petersburg to the Institute of Proletarian Culture in Kyiv.

Kiselgof was arrested in the summer of 1938 by the NKVD. His wife Guta died in July 1938, shortly after his arrest. Meanwhile, his daughter wrote petitions to Lavrentiy Beria, head of the NKVD, asking for his release and the right to meet with him. Kiselgof was released from prison on May 11, 1939, and died within a month due to poor health. He was apparently buried in the Preobrazhénskoye Jewish cemetery in Saint Petersburg, although the location of his gravesite cannot be found.

== Legacy ==
A number of composers affiliated with the GOSET theatre and the Society for Jewish Folk Music used folkloric materials collected by Kiselgof in their compositions. These include Joseph Achron in his music for the plays The Sorceress and Mazltov, Lev Pulver in the music for Two Hundred Thousand and Night at the Rebbe's House, and Alexander Krein in the music for At Night at the Old Marketplace.

His original manuscripts, cylinders and materials were held in the Institute of Proletarian Jewish Culture during his lifetime, and upon its dissolution in 1949 were sent to the Vernadsky National Library of Ukraine. Some audio recordings from his expeditions can be purchased on CD from the Vernadsky Library or streamed from their website. Some of those musical manuscripts, along with another set by Avraham-Yehoshua Makonovetsky, are currently being digitized by a crowdsourced project organized by the Klezmer Institute called the Kiselgof-Makonovetsky Digital Manuscript Project (KMDMP).
