= Pro Musica Hebraica =

- Formation: 2004
- Type: Not-for-profit organization
- Purpose: Bringing Jewish music to the concert hall
- Location: Washington, DC
- Chairman of the Board/Co-Founder: Charles Krauthammer
- Chief Executive Officer/Co-Founder: Robyn Krauthammer
- Executive Director: Hillel Ofek
- Board of Advisers: James Conlon, James Loeffler, Simon Wynberg
- Website: www.promusicahebraica.org

Pro Musica Hebraica (PMH) is a not-for-profit organization whose mission is "to present Jewish classical music – much of it lost or forgotten – in a concert hall setting." Since April 2008, Pro Musica Hebraica has presented 13 concerts, typically two per year, at Washington D.C.'s Kennedy Center for the Performing Arts. The series has featured performances by Itzhak Perlman, the ARC Ensemble of Canada, the Apollo Ensemble of Amsterdam, Jascha Nemtsov, and Marc-André Hamelin, among others. The concert recordings are not sold, but are available on the website for free. PMH concerts are occasionally broadcast on WETA (FM).

== History ==
Founded in 2004, Pro Musica Hebraica was the idea of lawyer-turned-artist Robyn Krauthammer, who recognized that there was a tradition of Jewish music that was neglected within the Jewish community and that deserved to be recovered and appreciated by the general public as great music worthy of the concert hall. As her husband (and PMH co-founder), Charles Krauthammer, put it, "when people hear 'Jewish music,' they think Israeli folk-dancing — 'Hava Nagila' — they think of liturgical music, they think of Kol Nidre, they might think of klezmer and that's it. It turns out there's a great, rich tradition of classical Jewish music people just don't know about." The idea is to bring Jewish experience, feeling, and history – 'Jewish soul,' if you like – as expressed through classical music. They presented the idea of twice yearly concerts of these neglected masterpieces to Kennedy Center Director Michael Kaiser, who offered his encouragement and support. In December 2012, Kaiser said that the Kennedy Center "is enjoying a wonderful collaborative relationship with Pro Musica Hebraica. Their concerts here are always well received, and it's been great to see the company grow."

Pro Musica Hebraica made its debut in the Terrace Theatre at the Kennedy Center on April 10, 2008, with a concert featuring Itzhak Perlman and the Juilliard players honoring the 100th anniversary of the St. Petersburg school of Jewish composers.

== Mission ==
Pro Musica Hebraica defines its mission as aspiring "to expose our audience to the magnificent range of Jewish music and to present Jewish composers not as cultural curiosities or ethnic heroes, but as passionate modern artists who embrace the challenge of expressing their Jewishness through the creative medium of music." As the founders emphasize, this mission is flexible, not focusing on a single region or style, and less on DNA than sensibility—an attachment, feeling, or concern with Jewish experience Jewish destiny. One of Pro Musica Hebraica's primary goals is education – training a new generation of musicians to learn the works while leading new audiences to appreciate the Jewish tradition and Jewish music. "If only a few of these compositions end up in the canon," Charles Krauthammer says, "it will be a great achievement."

== Inaugural concert ==
Pro Musica Hebraica's first concert (on April 10, 2008) featured musicians from the Juilliard School and Itzhak Perlman as a special guest. It celebrated the centenary of the 1908 Society for Jewish Folk Music in St. Petersburg, a group of self-defined Jewish composers from Russia and the first association devoted to Jewish musical traditions. Responding to the challenge of European nationalism, the St. Petersburg Society "gave rise to what would become known as Jewish art music—music that deliberately melded Western and Russian classical music with Hasidic melodies, Yiddish folk songs and synagogue chants, capturing the sounds of the towns and villages of the Pale of Settlement." As Charles Krauthammer explained, "It's music that's either consciously or unconsciously drawn from the folk, the klezmer, the liturgical, the shtetl," and reinterpreted in the spirit of "modern classical sensibility." The concert presented the forgotten works of composers Joel Engel, Solomon Rosowsky, and Alexander Krein. The embrace of Jewish music by these composers influenced the likes of Sergei Prokofiev and Dmitri Shostakovich.

== Reception ==
Reviews of the concert series have been quite positive. In a review of the inaugural concert, the Washington Post wrote that PMH's inaugural concert was "an auspicious start" to an organization that is "breathing new life into lost Jewish music."

PMH's Fall 2008 concert, which featured the performance of the ARC Ensemble of Toronto and the music of "last century's least-known Jewish geniuses," Mieczsław Weinberg, was called a "powerful performance."

PMH's Fall 2010 concert, which focused on the work of Karel Berman, Paul Ben-Haim, and Walter Braunfels, was lauded as "enthralling mix" that "riveted the audience's attention."

Its Fall 2011 concert, which included works by Alexander Krein, was described as reflecting "romantic longing and peasant energy, the imperatives of both dance and religion and a reverence for history, all couched in the modality and the emphatic rhythms that characterize so much of what we recognize as a Jewish musical tradition."

Its Spring 2012 concert, featuring Marc-Andre Hamelin, was praised by Anne Midgette, chief media critic for the Washington Post, as "an intimate and engaging concert" with a "refreshingly intriguing program." She wrote: "Hamelin did an outstanding job bringing across a lot of unfamiliar music to the audience," adding: "Hamelin proceeded to play [the second encore] so engagingly that the audience was laughing along with some of the more extreme variations…and jumped to its feet when he was done." Music critic Stephen Brooke called the Fall 2012 concert "a blazing, larger-than-life performance that seemed to celebrate the triumph of the human spirit, even from the depths of chaos." Reviewing PMH's first ever winter concert featuring Cantor Netanel Hershtik, Joan Reinthaler said, "A superstar cantor opens Pro Musica Hebraica with strength and agility.... The program ranged from music for the liturgy to music for the theater, but all of it embodied that potent combination of sinuous, Eastern modality and heart-on-the-sleeve 19th-century romantic operatic drama that can convey both sorrow and exultation with so much dramatic juice."

== Composers ==
- Joseph Achron (1886–1943)
- Charles-Valentin Alkan (1780–1855)
- Paul Ben-Haim (1897–1984)
- Karel Berman (1919–1995)
- Ernest Bloch (1880–1959)
- Walter Braunfels (1882–1954)
- Abraham Caceres (fl. 1740)
- Frédéric Chopin (1810–1849)
- Joel Engel (1868–1927)
- Meir Finkelstein (born 1951)
- Mikhail Gnesin (1883–1957)
- Osvaldo Golijov (born 1960)
- Yossi Green (born 1955)
- Erich Korngold (1897–1957)
- Alexander Krein (1883–1951)
- Louis Lewandowski (1821–1894)
- Benedetto Giacomo Marcello (1686–1739)
- Michel Michelet (1894–1995)
- Darius Milhaud (1892–1974)
- Moishe Oysher (1906–1958)
- Sergei Prokofiev (1891–1953)
- Maurice Ravel (1875–1937)
- Solomon Rosowsky (1878–1962)
- Salamone Rossi (c. 1570–1630)
- Franz Schubert (1797–1828)
- Arnold Schoenberg (1874–1951)
- Erwin Schulhoff (1894–1942)
- Dmitri Shostakovich (1906–1975)
- Joachim Stutschewsky (1891–1982)
- Alexandre Tansman (1897–1986)
- Alexander Veprik (1889–1958)
- Jacob Weinberg (1879–1956)
- Leo Zeitlin (1884–1930)

== Musicians ==
- Mark Glanville
- Itzhak Perlman
- Robert Pomakov
- Konstantin Soukhovetski
- Orion Weiss
