= Yiddish song =

Yiddish song is a general description of several genres of music sung in Yiddish which includes songs of Yiddish theatre, Klezmer songs, and "Yiddish art song" after the model of the German Lied and French mélodie.

== The Yiddish language and song ==
From the fourteenth century secular songs were sung in Yiddish, though rabbis of the period directed that sacred songs were only to be sung in Hebrew.

== Yiddish folk songs ==
One of the main genres of Yiddish folk song in Central and Eastern Europe is Klezmer, which was also exported to America and Israel, though Henry Sapoznik (2005) writes "Historically, Yiddish song and theater have had a higher visibility than klezmer music in Israel." Generally 17th and 18th century songs and lullabies are anonymous, but the composers of others such as are known; such as Oyfn Pripetshik "On The Hearth" by Mark Warshawsky.

== Yiddish theatre songs ==
In Europe many of the songs of the Yiddish theatre companies were composed as incidental music to musical theatre, or at least plays with strong musical content, whereas others are "hit" individual arias and numbers culled from Yiddish operetta. In America, aside from America's own Yiddish theatres, songwriters and composers employed Yiddish folk and theatre songs, along with synagogue modes and melodies, as material for the music of Tin Pan Alley, Broadway and Hollywood. Irving Berlin was one of the popular composers to move from Yiddish song to English songs. Bei Mir Bistu Shein is an example of a Yiddish song which was later recast as an English hit.

== Yiddish political and secular choral song ==
Di Shvue "The Oath" (1902) was the Yiddish anthem of the socialist, General Jewish Labour Bund in early 1900s Russia. Another song by the same composer, S. Ansky (Shloyme Zanvl Rappoport), was In Zaltsikn Yam "In the Salty Sea". Yiddish workers' choral societies continued - including that led by Lazar Weiner in New York until the 1960s. Zog Nit Keyn Mol "Never say (this is the end of the road)" was a partisan song written in 1943 by Hirsh Glick, for the Vilna Ghetto resistance.

== Yiddish art songs ==
Composers of self-consciously "serious" Yiddish art songs include the composers of the Society for Jewish Folk Music founded in St. Petersburg in 1908 which was associated with composers including "the Jewish Glinka" Michael Gniessin, Joseph Achron, Moses Milner, Lazare Saminsky, Alexander Krein, and Solomon Rosowsky. In America composers included young immigrants Lazar Weiner, Solomon Golub, film composer Henech Kon, and Los Angeles cantor Paul Lamkoff. Though like many German Lieder and French mélodies Yiddish art songs may make sensitive use of folk tunes. One example of a conscious 21st Century approach to the Yiddish folk song as art song, as tribute to Schubert, are the A Yiddish Winterreise and Di Sheyne Milnerin cycles of folk songs arranged by Alexander Knapp for English baritone Mark Glanville. New settings of Yiddish poetry continue today as well including vayter un vayter (2012), a selection of Abraham Sutzkever poems set to music by Judith Shatin, and and all the days were purple (2017/2019), a song cycle including poetry in Yiddish by Anna Margolin, Abraham Sutzkever, Rachel Korn, and others by Alex Weiser which was named a 2020 Pulitzer Prize Finalist for Music.

== Selected Recordings ==
Art song

- The Yiddish Art Song Leon Lishner, bass; Lazar Weiner, piano. Omega
- A Yiddish Winterreise Mark Glanville, baritone; Alexander Knapp, piano. Naxos. Includes songs by Mordecai Gebirtig, and others.
