= New Jewish School =

20th-century Jewish art music movement in Russia

The New Jewish School (Russian: Новая еврейская школа (НЕШ)) was a movement in Russia of the 1900s to create a national Jewish art music. It was connected with the founding of the Society for Jewish Folk Music.

== Selected discography ==
- Eli Zion - from St. Petersburg to Jerusalem - Music from the "New Jewish School" : Joseph Achron: Fragment mystique. Ernest Bloch: Méditation hébraïque. From Jewish Life. Sinowi Feldman Poem. Solomon Rosowsky: Rhapsodie - Récitatif et Danse Hassidique. Lazare Saminsky: Chassidic Suite: Chassidic Dance. Chassidic Suite: Meditation. Joachim Stutschewsky: Frejlachs. Shir Yehudi. Israeli Suite. Leo Zeitlin: Eli Zion - paraphrase on a folk theme and trope of 'Song of Songs'. Performed by David Geringas (cello) and Jascha Nemtsov (piano). recording SWR. released Hänssler Classic.
