= Joel Engel (composer) =

Russian music critic and composer (1868–1927)

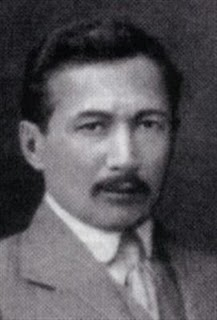
- Engel, c. 1924

Background information
- Born: 28 April [O.S. 16 April] 1868; Berdyansk, Russian Empire
- Died: 11 February 1927 (aged 58) Tel Aviv, Mandatory Palestine
- Genre: Jewish art music
- Occupations: Composer; critic; teacher; impresario
- Works: Founder of the Jewish art music movement
- Years active: 1900–1927

Joel Engel (also Yoel or Yury; Russian: Юлий Дмитриевич (Йоэль) Энгель, romanized: Yuly Dmitriyevich (Yoel) Engel; 28 April [O.S. 16 April] 1868 – 11 February 1927) was a Russian music critic, composer and one of the leading figures in the Jewish art music movement. Born in the Russian Empire, and later moving to Berlin and then to Mandatory Palestine, Engel has been called "the true founding father of the modern renaissance of Jewish music."

As a composer, teacher, and organizer, Engel inspired a generation of Jewish classical musicians to rediscover their ethnic roots and create a new style of nationalist Jewish music, modelled after the national music movements of Russia, Slovakia, Hungary and elsewhere in Europe. This style—developed by composers Alexander Krein, Lazare Saminsky, Mikhail Gnesin, Solomon Rosowsky, and others—was an important influence on the music of many twentieth-century composers, as well as on the folk music of Israel. His work in preserving the musical tradition of the shtetl—the 19th-century Jewish village of eastern Europe—made possible the revival of klezmer music today.

== Early life and work ==
Engel was born Yuliy Dmitrievich Engel in Berdyansk (present-day Ukraine). Unlike most Jewish families of the period, he grew up outside of the Pale of Settlement, the area designated by the Tsar as legal for Jewish residence. His parents were secular Jews. Engel studied law at Kharkov University, and later, at the urging of Pyotr Ilyich Tchaikovsky, who heard his compositions, entered the Moscow Conservatory.

After graduating from the conservatory, Engel worked as the music critic of the influential Russian newspaper Russkiye Vedomosti. He became an influential figure in Russian musical life, supporting composers who wrote in the increasingly popular Russian nationalist style.

In 1907, he published his Brief Musical Dictionary (Kratkiy muzykal'nyy slovar; P. Jurgenson, Moscow/Leipzig), and between 1901 and 1904, the Russian edition of H. Riemann's comprehensive Musik-Lexikon had been published under his editorship.

== Interest in Jewish music ==
According to Jacob Weinberg (1879–1956), a concert pianist, classical composer and close associate, Engel had no interest in Jewish music until a catalyzing meeting in 1899 with Vladimir Stasov, art critic and a leading proponent of Russian nationalism in art and music. According to Weinberg, Stasov shouted at Engel, "Where is your national pride in your own people?" Engel experienced an epiphany, and took a profound interest in his Jewish musical roots.

In the summer of 1900, Engel returned to his home in Berdyansk, and collected Yiddish folk melodies. The next year, he organized lecture-concerts in Moscow and St. Petersburg, which included performances of the songs he had recorded and arranged.

Engel dedicated the next years to gathering and arranging Jewish folk music, presenting concerts, and encouraging other Jewish composers to rediscover their national roots and create a Jewish national musical style.

Engel wrote Jewish Folksongs, volume I in 1909 and Volume II in 1912, composing instrumentation for existing Jewish folk songs.

== The St. Petersburg Society and The Dybbuk ==
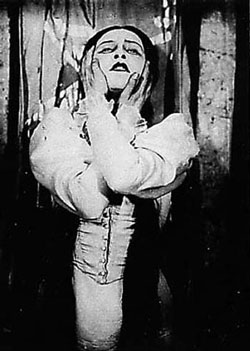
Hanna Rovina in The Dybbuk

In 1908, Rosovsky, Saminsky, Lyubov Streicher and other associates of Engel founded the Society for Jewish Folk Music. Engel was instrumental in organizing their first concert, where many of his songs were performed. The society published the works of Engel and the other Jewish nationalist composers, and organized concerts throughout Russia. Several stars of musical life at the time, including violinists Jascha Heifetz (then a child prodigy) and Joseph Achron, pianist Leopold Godowsky and cellist Gregor Piatigorsky, participated in these concerts.

In an article of 1914, Saminsky recalled the first concert of Engel's music in St. Petersburg, given under the auspices of the Society on 12 April 1909.

The young Jewish composers of St. Petersburg heard for the first time Engels's artistic arrangements of Jewish folksongs [...] and were greatly surprised that such cultural and national value could result from such an enterprise. This concert stimulated the young Petersburg composers in the following period to the creation and performance of a whole series of Jewish song settings.

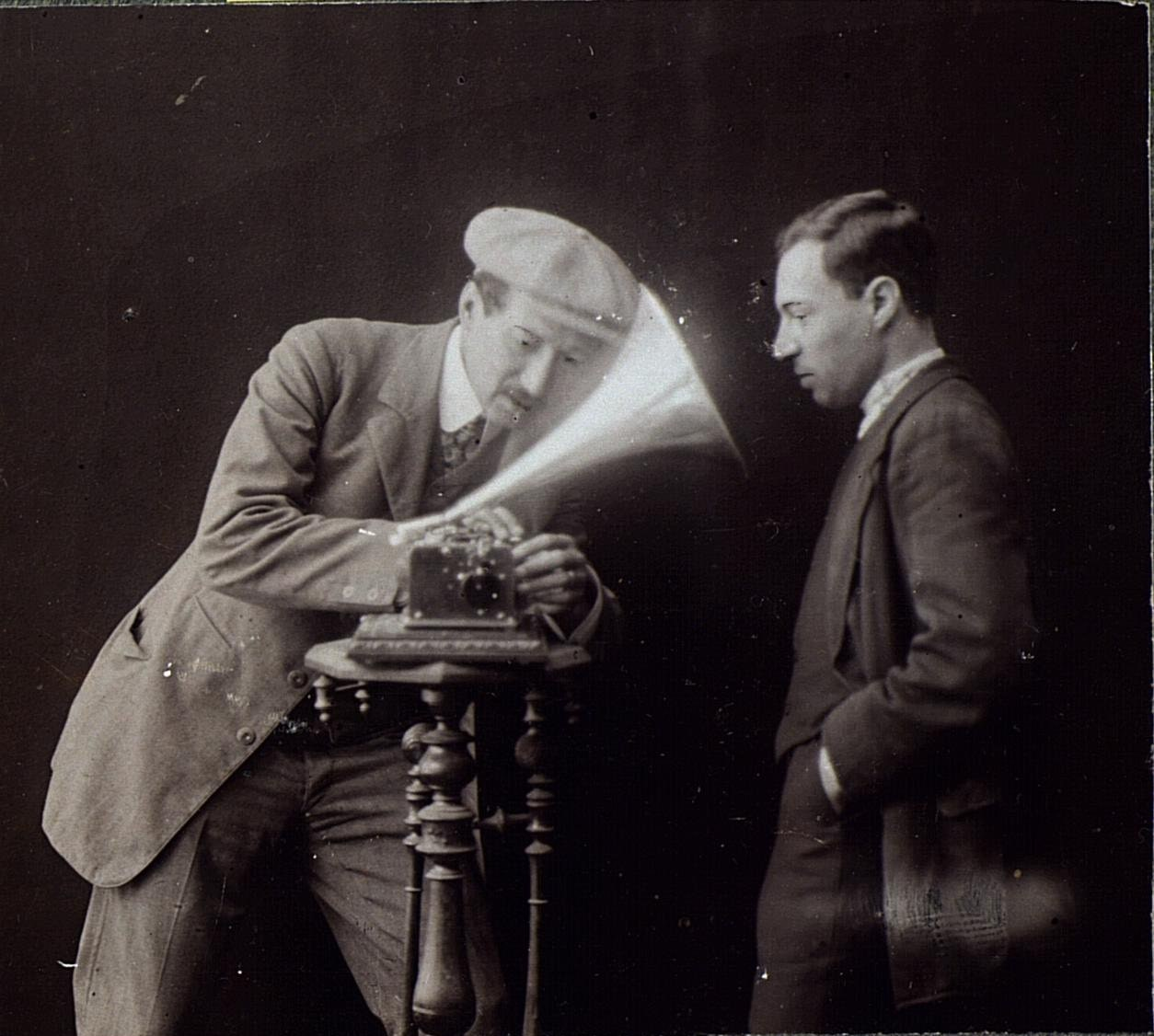
Engel (left) with a phonograph used for recording Jewish folk songs

In 1912, Engel joined S. An-sky in the Jewish Ethnographic Expedition through the Pale of Settlement to collect folk songs of the Jewish communities. The researchers recorded the folksongs on wax cylinders using Thomas Edison's recently invented phonograph. This was one of the first uses of the phonograph in ethnomusicological research, a technique pioneered by Béla Bartók in Hungary and Slovakia four years earlier.

Engel wrote the incidental music for An-sky's play The Dybbuk or Between Two Worlds. The play, about a young bride possessed by a spirit, was produced by the Habima Theatre, and became an international hit. The theater toured throughout eastern Europe with the play. Engel's score became well known. He later worked the score into a suite for string orchestra and clarinet. It was Engel's first work for the stage, and his only large-scale work; his other compositions are songs and short instrumental pieces.

Further cooperation between Engel and Habima never materialized, as the theater company experienced political troubles under the new post-revolutionary Russian regime, and was forced eventually to emigrate (first to America, and later to Palestine, where it eventually became the national theater company). Engel supported himself by working as a music teacher in a Jewish school outside of Moscow, where he developed a distinctive pedagogical approach. Rather than concentrating on music theory, he instituted a "listening program". "There is no need—and is boring to everyone—... to teach that a second is dissonant and a third is consonant... Rather we need... to let [children] listen to good music, ... to learn to love, enjoy, and live it," he wrote. The approach was the start of a revolution in music pedagogy.

== Berlin and Palestine ==
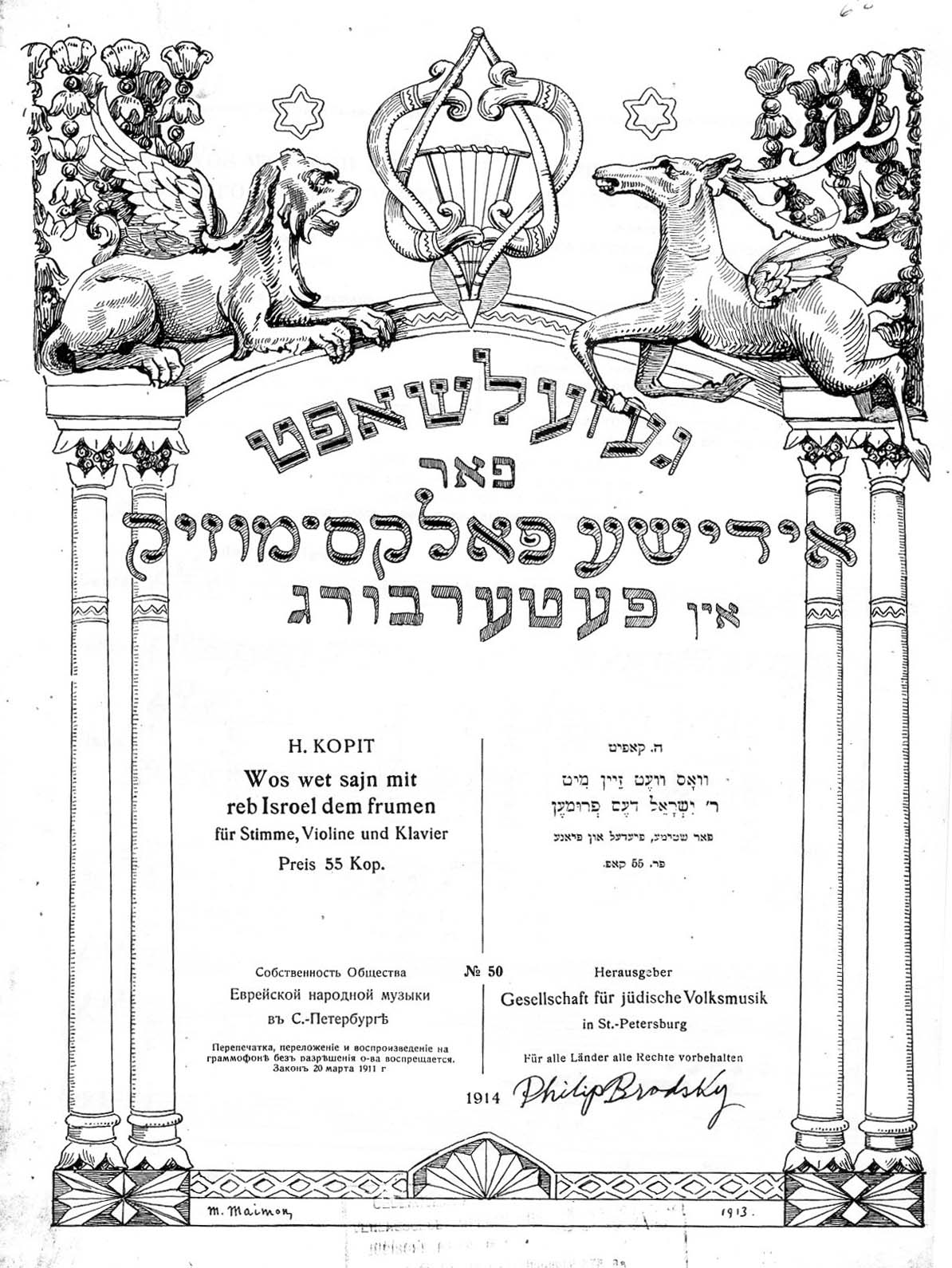
Title page of a publication of Juwal. The cover sheet shows the logo that appeared on the Society's publications: a star of David enclosing a harp, flanked by a winged lion and a deer, recalling the Mishnaic adage "Quick as a deer, strong as a lion."

In 1922, the Society sent Engel on a mission to Germany, to promote the new Jewish music movement in the German Jewish community. Engel organized a series of concerts in Berlin and Leipzig, including performances of songs and instrumental works by Engel, Krein, Gnesin, Rosowsky, and others. Among the performers in these concerts was Gregor Piatigorsky.

The following year, Engel opened the Juwal (Yuval) publishing house in Berlin. Juwal became the main publisher for composers of the society, printing editions of songs and chamber works in the new Jewish style. Yet, despite his intense activity in Germany as a composer, publisher and impresario, Engel was dissatisfied, and decided to move to Palestine.

By now a renowned composer in the Jewish world, Engel's arrival was awaited anxiously by the Jewish community in Tel Aviv and Jaffa. He was offered a position teaching theory at the Shulamit music school, and there was some discussion of setting up a full conservatory under his direction. Engel moved to Palestine in 1924.

In Palestine, Engel devoted himself to teaching and to composing, primarily children's and folk songs. Concerned that children's songs at the time were either European tunes with new words in Yiddish or Hebrew, or Yiddish songs from the shtetl, Engel tried to create a new, indigenous style. "How can we sing the song of the Diaspora in the promised land?" he wrote in a letter. Many of his new songs were based on Yemenite melodies or motifs.

During his life in Palestine, Engel also became associated with the Ohel theater group, one of the first theaters in Palestine. He wrote incidental music for the original play "Nishfey Y.L. Perets", which toured the Jewish settlements of Palestine. He organized and conducted the Ohel choir, and wrote many new songs for choir and solo. His songs were popular, and were sung throughout Palestine.

In spite of the warm reception he received, Engel had a difficult time adjusting to life in Palestine. "I was pampered in Moscow and Berlin," he wrote in a letter in 1924. "... Here no one knows what Engel the composer wrote then, and what he is writing now." His health gradually failed, and on 11 February 1927, he died in Tel Aviv.

== Engel's music ==
Engel was one of the first—perhaps the first—musician to recognize that traditional Jewish music was not based on the major-minor tonal system that dominated classical and popular music of the period. "Most Jewish songs are built on the ancient modes (Aeolian, Dorian, Mixolydian, and so on)," he wrote in 1900. "Occasionally, one encounters major or minor; but more common are modes that are not written in our modern text books, and could be called 'eastern'." This harmonic conception is apparent in Engel's compositions. For example, in the Dybbuk suite, opus 35, Engel uses an augmented fifth as the tonic chord, rather than a standard major or minor chord.

Aside from the Dybbuk suite, for string orchestra and clarinet, Engel wrote no orchestral music, and no large-scale works (symphonies, operas, concertos, and so on). His entire oevre is either piano solo, chamber works, or songs. He frequently used innovative combinations for his chamber music; for example, "Adagio Mysterioso", opus 22, is scored for violin, cello, harp and organ. He, like others of the Jewish art music movement, favored songs with obbligato string parts. The song "Ahava Rahya", for example, is scored for singer and violin, flute, viola and organ.

Many of Engel's songs are based on traditional Jewish folksongs. For example, his cradle song "Numi Numi Yaldaty" ("sleep, sleep my child"), is a variant of a traditional Yiddish lullaby. However, Engel often draws on sources other than Jewish traditional music, as well. Ahava Rahya, cited above, is based on an Arabic melody, and many of the tunes he composed in Palestine are based on Yemenite songs.

Engel's popular music, which during his lifetime dominated the popular music scene in Palestine, has been largely forgotten. Some of his songs, however, are still sung today. These include "Numi Numi", one of Israel's most popular lullabies; "Omrim Yeshna Eretz", the children's song "Geshem Geshem Mishamayim", and others.
