= Valentina Ramm =

Valentina Yosifovna Mandelstam Ramm (22 October 1888 - 3 July 1968) was a Ukrainian author, composer, coloratura soprano, translator and violinist. She composed over 100 songs and several string quartets.

== Life and work ==
Ramm was born in Kharkov, Ukraine. She graduated from the Leipzig Conservatory (today the University of Music and Theatre Leipzig) in 1908. Her teachers included B. Heidiger, S. Krell, K. Zitt (possibly Hans Sitt, who taught at the Leipzig Conservatory from 1884 to 1921), as well as Mikhail Gnessin in Moscow.

Ramm worked in several areas related to music:

- after 1908: sang and taught singing in Rostov-on-the-Don, Russia;
- 1928-29 secretary of the Association of Chamber Music and voice teacher at the Alexander Scriabin music school;
- 1930-32 editor for Muzgiz (at that time the Soviet State Music Publishing House) and director of a society for young composers;
- 1938-40 editor at a record company; and
- 1941-43 lecturer at the Kirov Music School.

Ramm wrote articles on the history of song and song in civil strife. She composed over 100 songs on texts by Soviet poets such as Aleksandr Aleksandrov, Alexander Blok, Mikhail Lermontov, Alexander Pushkin, Ovady Savich and Fyodor Tyutchev.

Fluent in German, Russian and Yiddish, Ramm translated two Bach cantatas into Russian, and translated works by Joel Engel, Mikhail Gnessin, Aleksandr Krein, and Aleksandr Veprik into German.

== Works ==
Ramm’s works were published by Universal (Leipzig).

=== Printed works ===
- International Collection of Revolutionary Songs (editor)
- Schubert v Massovoi Auditorii 1928
- Zapadnoyevrodeiskaya Khudozhestvennaya Pesnya 1929

=== Ballets ===
- Caliph-Stork
- Sleeping Beauty (incidental music)
- Tale of the Dead Princess and the Seven Knights

=== Chamber works ===
- Sonata (violin and piano)
- String Quartet No. 1, opus 16
- String Quartet No. 2
- Wind Quartet

=== Orchestral works ===
- Five Nights and Days: Funeral Stanzas, opus 7 (orchestra and baritone; text by

Vera Inber)

- Nike (voice and orchestra; text by Vladislav Bronevsky)
- Santa Ursula Cantata
- Slavyanski Marsh (wind orchestra)
- Torzhestvennie Marsh (wind orchestra)
- Udarnitzy Metalla Cantata (text by Tatyana Sikorskaya)
- V Stepnykh Aulakh Cantata (text by Dzhabaev Dzhambul)

=== Piano works ===
- From the World of Animals, opus 10
- Intermezzo, opus 5
- Suite

=== Vocal works ===
- Dni Voiny: Five Cycles (voice and string quartet; text by Soviet poets)
- Four Folk Songs (voice, string quartet and flute)
- O Voine, Eight Children’s Songs (voice and string quartet)
- Penthesilea: Triptych of Sofia Parnok, opus 9 (voice and piano)
- Rodina Cycle (voice and piano)
- Triptych, Penthesilea (voice and piano; text by Sophia Parnok)
- Two Children’s Songs, opus 4
