= Vera Inber =

Soviet poet and playwright (1890–1972)

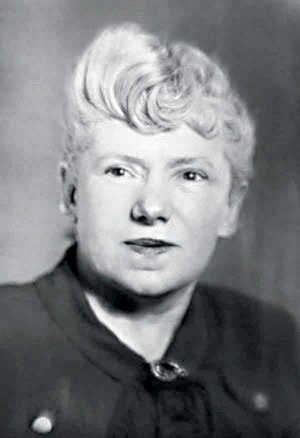
- Vera Mikhailovna Inber
- Native name: Вера Михайловна Инбер; Вера Моисеевна Шпенцер
- Born: Vera Moiseyevna Shpentser, 10 July 1890 Odesa, Russian Empire
- Died: 11 November 1972 (aged 82) Moscow, Soviet Union
- Occupation: Writer
- Period: 1919–1971
- Notable works: “The Pulkovo Meridian” (1942) “Almost Three Years” (1946)
- Notable awards: Stalin Prize (1946)
- Spouse: Nathan Inber (1911–1919); Alexander Naumovich Frumkin; Ilya Davidovich Strashun
- Children: Zhanna Gauzner

Signature
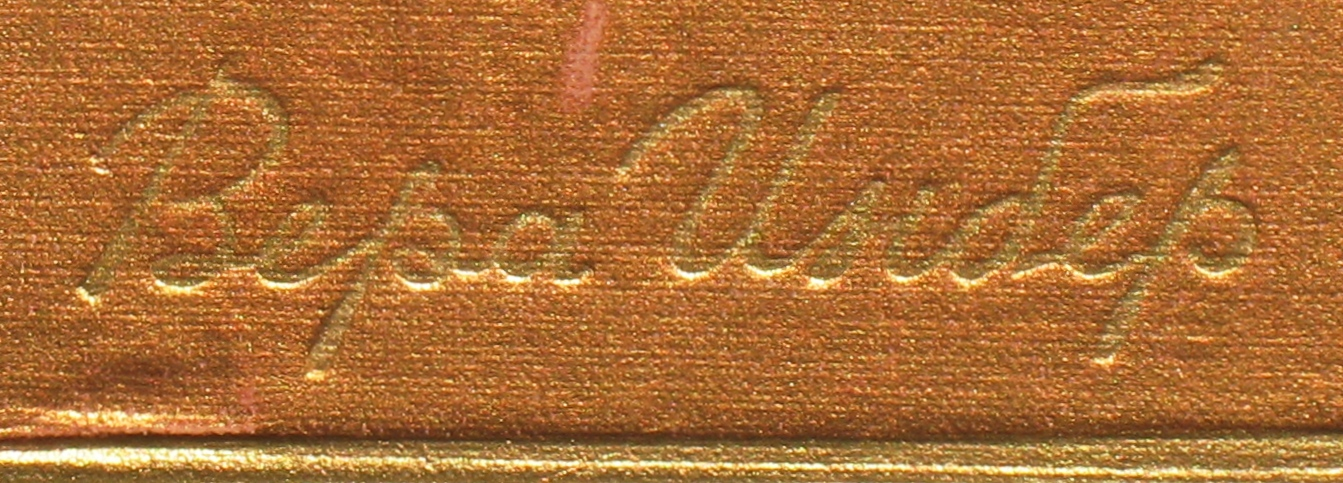

Vera Mikhailovna Inber (10 July 1890 – 11 November 1972) was a Soviet writer, poet, translator and playwright.

== Biography ==
=== Early life and family background ===
Inber was born as Vera Moiseevna Shpenster on July 10, 1890 to a middle-class Jewish family in Odesa. Her mother, Fanni Solomonovna, served as the head of a state school for Jewish girls. Her father, Moisey Shpentser, managed the Methesis publishing house.

Leon Trotsky, a well-known Soviet political figure, was her father’s cousin and lived in their family’s home for six years during Inber’s childhood, leaving an influence on Vera Inber’s political views later in life.

Inber obtained her early education in Odesa, having attended the Sholp Gymnasium, followed by the Pashkovskaya Gymnasium. She went on to enrol in “Odessa's Higher Women's Courses” in the department of History and Philology briefly before traveling across Europe.

=== Early career and travels ===
From 1910 to 1914 Inber spent time abroad with her first husband, Nathan Inber. Vera and Nathan lived together in Paris, France from 1912 to 1914, and it was also around this time that Vera travelled to Switzerland, spending around a year there for "treatment" before moving to Moscow in 1922.

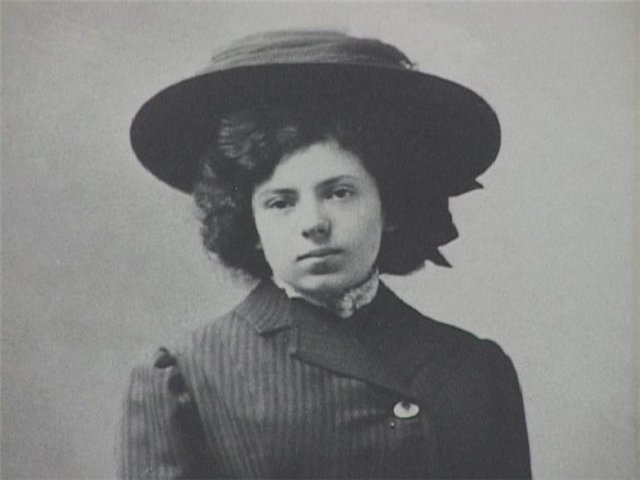
Vera Inber in Odessa, 1917

Inber's writings can be traced back to 1911 when she joined the Acmeists, a group of anti-symbolist Russian poets. Her career began around the time she published her first poetry collection in Paris, "Melancholy Wine" (1914). Inber’s early works displayed a mix of Acmeist and Symbolist influences, and critics noted Anna Akhmatova’s influence on her early poetry. In her later poetry collections, Inber developed an interest in description, landscape, and narrativism, as reflected in her works, "Bitter Delight" (1917) and “Wasteful Words” (1922).

=== Navigating Soviet literary life ===
Upon moving to Moscow, Inber attempted to assimilate among the Bolshevik literary intellectuals and “write in a new way”. A convinced communist herself, she did not want to leave the country as several others had done. She joined the Literary Center of Constructivists in 1924, marking a shift in her literary focus towards Constructivism and themes aligned with the new Soviet era. Her autobiographical work, “A Place under the Sun”, gained her early success and offers insights into her self-perception and relationship with her hometown, Odesa.

Inber’s travels to Scandinavia in 1934 further displayed her image as a Soviet writer promoting the achievements of socialism abroad. A notable milestone in Inber’s literary assimilation came in 1932 when she joined a group of 120 writers, led by Maksim Gorky, to produce a book on the White Sea Canal’s construction (which was carried out by forced labor of Gulag inmates). During the Great Purge, there were rumours and concerns that Inber might be among the targeted writers because of her family connections to Trotsky, but she was not repressed. However, she was the subject of a prominent 1939 literary controversy surrounding her "lyrical diary" which documented her travels to Georgia in a poetic voice.

=== World War II and the Siege of Leningrad ===
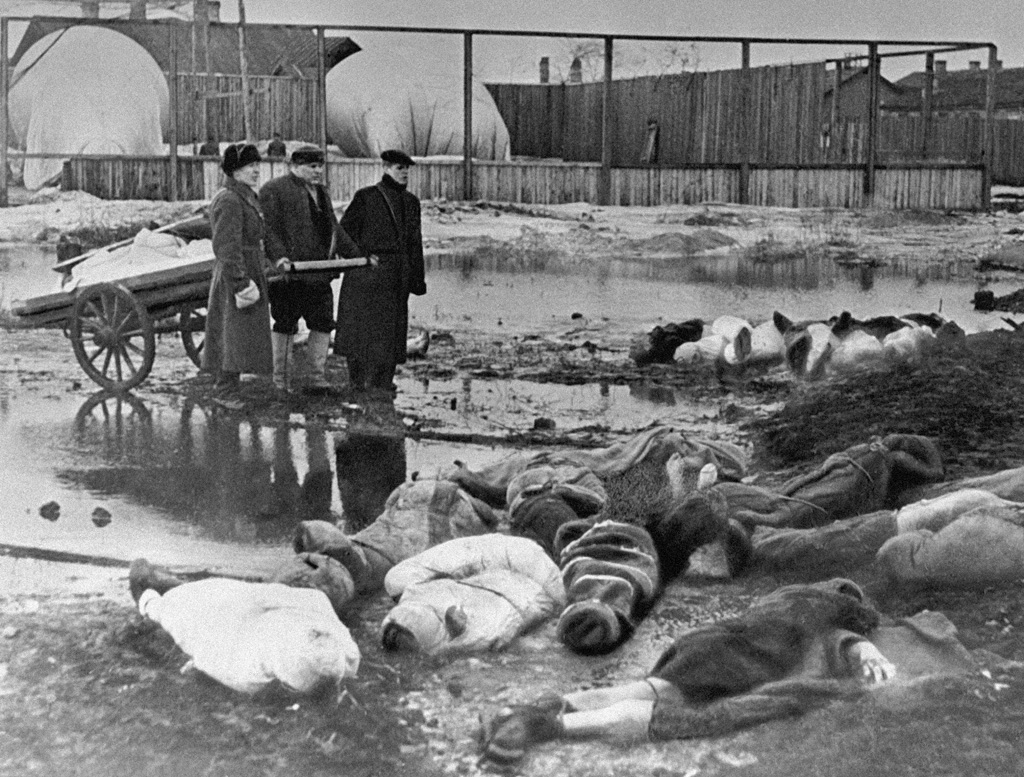
Three men burying victims of Leningrad's siege in 1942

On August 24, 1942, Inber recorded in her diary the hardships of life in besieged Leningrad, where she had endured hunger, cold, and bombardment for a year. She wrote about the city and its defenders while staying in Leningrad during the nine-hundred-day Nazi siege. She produced materials for Leningrad’s Soviet Information Bureau, radio station, and TASS (the News and Telegraph Agency).

From September 1941 to January 1944, German and Finnish forces surrounded the city, cutting off supplies in an attempt to force its surrender. During the winter of 1941–1942, up to 700,000 civilians died from starvation and hypothermia, receiving as little as 125 grams of bread per day. While rations and evacuations improved in 1942, malnutrition and shelling continued, and the blockade ultimately claimed over a million lives before being lifted in 1944.

Inber’s wartime works included The Soul of Leningrad: Poems 1941–1942 and Almost Three Years (1946), a diary documenting the siege, written between 1941 and 1944 and published in 1945. She also authored her most famous work, Pulkovskii Meridian (1942), which presents detailed and observational accounts of life under siege. The success of her works was contingent on her presentation of herself as an authoritative spokesperson for the people of the blockade.

=== Post-war career and later life (1945–1972) ===
During the post-war period, Inber continued to write, publishing works such as April: Poems about Lenin (1960), Vdokhnoveniye i masterstvo (1957), and her four-volume set of compiled work (1965–1966).

She remained politically active, participating in campaigns against other writers such as Boris Pasternak during Pasternak affair in 1958. She also contributed to a section on the Nazi extermination of Jews in Odessa, for Ilya Ehrenburg and Vasily Grossman’s Black Book of Russian Jewry, a project that was ultimately suppressed due to the political climate.

Her later travels, involved a second visit to Finland in 1959 as part of a Soviet writers' delegation. She returned to Moscow in 1964 to attend an interview where she spoke of her writings, travels, and the duty of writers to work "in the service of peace". She also fondly recalled her 1934 trip to Scandinavia during the interview, expressing a desire to revisit Sweden, which did not end up taking place before the end of her life.

In the final years of her life, Inber remained in Moscow and did not publish another work as popular as Pulkovo Meridian (1942) or Almost Three Years (1945). Two months before her death in 1972, she donated her wartime diaries to Leningrad’s central library.

=== Personal life and relationships ===
Vera took the last name of her first husband, Nathan Inber, with whom she had a daughter with in 1912, Zhanna Gauzner.

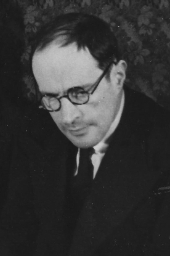
Vera Inber’s second husband, Alexander Frumkin.

Inber’s second marriage was with Alexander Naumovich Frumkin, in 1920. Frumkin was a renowned chemist who later became one of the founders of the Soviet electrochemical school. Her marriage to Frumkin was brief, but was said to have left her with social and professional advantages in the Soviet capital due to his respected background.

Ilya Davidovich Strashun, a Soviet physician, was Inber’s third husband. Strashun was a notable figure in Inber’s life, as reflected in her poetry. She dedicated the fifth chapter of her poem, Pulkovo Meridian, to him. The section depicts the narrator and her "lifelong companion" in Leningrad's Botanical Garden during the war.

Inber’s daughter, Zhanna Gauzner, ended up following her mother’s footsteps in pursuing a career as a writer. Inber’s daughter also had a son, Mikhail.

In her lifetime, Inber witnessed both her daughter and grandson die. Her daughter passed in 1962, and her grandson died during the blockade of Leningrad.

== Legacy ==
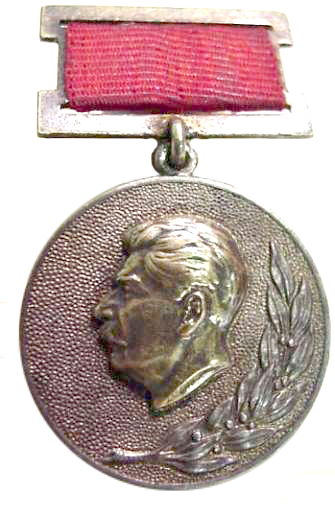
Stalin Prize Medal

Inber is best known for her literary works on the Siege of Leningrad where she served as a war correspondent.

Her most acclaimed work, The Pulkovo Meridian (1943) is regarded as “one of the best long poems on the theme of war in Soviet literature”, and earned her the Stalin Prize in 1946.

Inber was also awarded the Stalin Prize in 1946 for Almost Three Years (1945), a collection of essays also based on her experiences during the Siege.

Her earlier work, A Place in the Sun (1928), gained international recognition and was translated into Swedish and Finnish.

Ukrainian composer Valentina Ramm used Inber’s text for her composition Five Nights and Days: Funeral Stanzas, opus 7.

=== English translations ===
- Maya, from Such a Simple Thing and Other Stories, FLPH, Moscow, 1959. from Archive.org
- The Death of Luna, from Soviet Short Stories: A Penguin Parallel Text, Penguin, 1963.
- Leningrad Diary, Hutchinson, UK, 1971.
- Lalla's Interests, from Russian Short Stories from Pushkin to Buida, Penguin Classics, 2005.
