= Grigory Kompaneyets =

Ukrainian composer (1881–1959)

Grigory Isaakovich Kompaneyets (Ukrainian: Григорій Ісакович Компані́єць, Russian: Григорий Исаакович Компанеец) (1881–1959) was an internationally recognized composer, choir conductor, and educator.

== Biography ==
Grigory Kompaneyets was born in Poltava, Ukraine. During his childhood, his family moved to Rostov, where he received his early musical training in the synagogue choir. In 1904–05, he took voice lessons in Milan, with the Italian tenor Augusto Brogi. He was active in the Society for Jewish Folk Music, and in 1912, he conducted the first performance of the opera Samson and Delilah in a modern Hebrew translation, at the St. Petersburg Conservatory. In 1916, he conducted an orchestra of 83 musicians for a concert organized by Society for Jewish Folk Music in St. Petersburg, the first performance by a large orchestra in this context. In the same year, he graduated from the St. Petersburg Conservatory.

In the mid-1920s, Kompaneyets moved to Mandatory Palestine, where he served as musical director of Habima. His String Quartet No. 1, reconstructed by Alon Schab, dates from this period. Kompaneyets returned to the Soviet Union in 1932. From 1932 to 1934, he taught conducting and score-reading at the Kharkiv National University of Arts, and at the same time headed the music department of the Jewish Theater. In 1934, one of his choral compositions, Doshchychok (дощичок), also known by its Yiddish title, A Regendl, was selected by the Soviet Composer's Union for a highly visible act of cultural diplomacy. Published by Mystetsvo, Kharkiv, with a new translation into Ukrainian by Yuriy Koretskiy (1911-1941) it was presented to the American choral conductor John Finley Williamson, during the Westminster Chorus's visit to the Soviet Union. Doshchychok received a Carnegie Hall premiere in November 1934.

In 1938, Kompaneyets was appointed to the bureau of the newly established Jewish Section of the Soviet Union of Composers. In 1939, he composed a popular and influential children's opera, "The Wolf and the Seven Little Goats," with a libretto by Mariia Prygara. Its success brought him further recognition and acceptance into the Soviet mainstream, but this recognition also led to an emphasis on his children's works, at the expense of his other compositions. In 1940, he was appointed to the rank of professor at the Kyiv Conservatory, a position he held until 1952. His students included Mykhailo Berdennikov, Boris Chistyakov, and the bandurist Andriy Bobyr. Concurrently, from 1941 to 1943 he was choirmaster at the Ulyanovsk House of Culture and head of the music department of the theater in Nukus, Karakalpakstan SSR.

Kompaneyets was influential both as a composer and as a teacher. As a composer, he is recognized as one of the first generation of modern Ukrainian composers. His compositions for young musicians have proved to be especially durable. In 2017, his piano piece, "Variations on the theme of the Ukrainian folk song 'Two cockerels,' was reprinted in a popular Russian anthology for young pianists.

He died on January 16, 1959 in Kyiv.

== Selected works ==
- Children's operas:
  - "Snow Hut" (1939)
  - "The Wolf and the Seven Kids" (1940; 2nd edition – 1954)
  - "The Glove" (1940)
  - "The Crooked Duck" (1946)
- For Wind Orchestra – Two Marches (1952)
- For string quartet – Quartet (1925, manuscript lost. Score reconstructed by Alon Schab, 2021), "Ukrainian Dance" (1947)
- For piano – Sonata (1925), "Natella" (1926), Scherzo (1948), two suites (1952, 1958), Variations on a Ukrainian folk song (1953)
- For chorus – "Doshchychok" (дощичок), also known as "A Regendl" (The Shower), 1934; American edition (as "Adoizdechic," 1963)
