= Zinovy Feldman =

Russian composer

To be distinguished from the Russian film director (Zinovy Levovich Feldman ru) (1919—1989)

Zinovii Petrovich Feldman also Zinovy, and in German sources Sinowi (Фельдман Зиновий Петрович. 1893, Berdychiv – 1942) was a Soviet composer. He was a member of the Moscow Society for Jewish Music and composed various pieces of chamber music. He was a friend of, and influenced by Alexander Krein. Prokofiev regarded Feldman highly, and entrusted him with the orchestration of some of his works. Feldman died during the Second World War at the age of 49.
