= Isadore Freed =

Isadore Freed (March 26, 1900 – November 10, 1960) was a Jewish composer of Belarusian birth.

== Biography ==
Born in Brest-Litovsk, in what is now Brest, Belarus, Freed's family emigrated to the United States when Freed was three years old and settled in Philadelphia, where his father owned a music store. Freed began playing piano at age seven, and began composing at age nine.

Freed's formal music education was at the University of Pennsylvania, where he earned a bachelor's degree at the age of 18. After graduation from Penn, Freed briefly held a teaching post at The Curtis Institute of Music. In 1924, he married Riva Hoffmann, a dancer in Isadora Duncan's troupe. Following this Freed went to Berlin where he briefly studied piano with Josef Weiss, and then to Paris where he studied composition with Ernest Bloch, Nadia Boulanger, Louis Vierne and Vincent d'Indy. He also studied piano with Józef Hofmann and George Bayle, and organ with Rollo Maitland.

Freed returned to the United States in 1934, and shortly after he was employed by the composition department at Temple University from the mid-1930s until the mid-1940s, but sources disagree as to the dates of his appointment. In 1944, Freed was named head of the composition department at the Hartt School of Music (now known simply as The Hartt School), where he taught in various capacities until his death in 1960. In 1951 he was also hired as Harmony instructor at the Hebrew Union College, School of Sacred Music. He also served as a radio commentator for performances of the Philadelphia Orchestra, and edited a number of scores in conjunction with Lazare Saminsky.

Freed died in Rockville Centre, New York, on November 10, 1960.

== Freed's work ==
Freed's primary contribution to scholarly discourse is his book, Harmonizing the Jewish Modes, a theoretical treatise discussing Jewish sacred music in the context of Western European music theory, particularly the synagogue mode and its lack of a strong tonic-dominant relationship.

Freed was also active as a synagogue musician, acting as organist and choirmaster at Temple Keneseth Israel in Philadelphia. His work as a synagogue musician led him to compose Jewish liturgical works, beginning with his Sacred Service for Shabbat Morning, published in 1939. Many feel that this is his most enduring musical work.

In 1946, he was commissioned by the Julius Hartt Foundation to write an opera, The Princess and the Vagabond which was premiered at the Hartt School two years later. In 1944 he received prizes for two works: Triptych for violin, viola, violoncello and piano, and Postscripts, a choral work which won the Eurydice Choral Prize. His Rhapsody for Trombone and Orchestra, received a radio broadcast premiere in New York in 1951.

After the composer's death, the National Jewish Music Council published a brief biography of Freed, A Jewish Composer by Choice: Isadore Freed, His Life and Work, which contains reminiscences of Freed's life and works by friends and colleagues including Pierre Monteux, who programmed Freed's Jeux de Timbres for concerts in San Francisco and Amsterdam in 1937, the same year in which Freed became the first American composer to be guest conductor for the NBC Symphony Orchestra.

Freed was both a secular and sacred composer with deep interest in Jewish liturgical music as well as the promotion of contemporary secular music, being a co-founder of the Philadelphia Society for Contemporary Music and the Philadelphia Chamber Orchestra and Composers' Laboratory, the latter of which was superseded by the WPA Music Project Composers' Forum Laboratory.
