= Jacob Weinberg =

Russian composer (1879–1956)

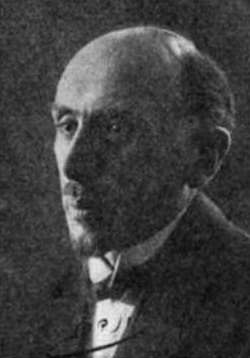
- Born: 1 July 1879; Odessa, Russian Empire
- Died: 2 November 1956 (aged 77); New York City, US
- Education: Moscow University; Moscow Conservatory of Music
- Occupations: Composer; pianist

Jacob Weinberg (1 July 1879 – 2 November 1956) was a Russian-born American Jewish composer and pianist who composed over 135 works for piano and other instruments. He was one of the founders of the Jewish National Conservatory in Jerusalem before immigrating to the U.S. where he became "an influential voice in the promotion of American Jewish music" from the 1940s until his death.

== Life and career ==
Weinberg was born in Odessa in the Russian Empire (present-day Ukraine) to Dora and Wolf (Zev) Weinberg. His family was middle class and his father was a merchant who died when Jacob was only 12. Jacob wrote an essay about how he had been sent to a synagogue to say the Kaddish prayer in mourning for his father. He wrote that he had not been raised in an Orthodox home and he was not familiar with the sounds of the Hebrew language in the prayer but he fell in love with the music of the language and the rhythm of the prayer. This sparked his interest in Jewish religion and Jewish music.

One of his uncles was Peter (or Pyotr) Isaevich Weinberg (or "Veinberg"). (Peter was a very prominent translator of Shakespeare, Goethe, Heine and other luminaries into Russian. Peter was a friend of Anton Chekhov who recommended Peter for The Pushkin Prize in 1901, and Peter won it. Anton also referred him for membership in the Russian Academy of Science.) Jacob completed law school at Moscow University, but he never practiced, preferring his piano studies. He studied at the Moscow Conservatory of Music from 1901 to 1906, under many prominent teachers including Taneyev and Ippolito-Ivanov. In 1910, he spent the year studying privately with Theodor Leschetizky. In addition, he studied composition for a year in Vienna, under Sergei Taneyev. He taught piano as well; among his students were Josef Yasser, with whom he remained friends for many years to come.

Weinberg toured Russia as a pianist and also toured with Emil Rosenoff in their two-piano concerts from 1912 to 1916. He adapted Rachmaninoff's works to create a two-piano piece he called Rachmaniana. It was published and performed by Weinberg and Rosenoff. He was also very interested in preserving the unique melodies and music scales of Jewish religious and secular folk tunes. When the St. Petersburg Society for Jewish Folk Music was formed in 1908 by Joel Engel, Lazare Saminsky, and others, Jacob Weinberg and his Moscow-based peers formed the Moscow branch of this society. Then he returned to Odessa, where he taught at the Odessa Conservatory of Music.

With the advent of the Bolshevik Revolution, Weinberg spent two months in prison and then fled with his wife Theresa (née Bernstein) and his only child, a son, Walter, in 1922 to Palestine (now Israel). There he composed the first Hebrew opera, The Pioneers (Hechalutz). It won First Prize in an international composition contest, sponsored by the Philadelphia Sesquicentennial. There was a performance in Jerusalem in April, 1925. He taught piano; among his students was the pianist Mordecai Sandberg.

With the competition prize money of $1,500, Weinberg took his family to New York.

Weinberg produced concert versions of his opera The Pioneers at Carnegie Hall in 1941 and 1947, and at the Mecca Temple (now New York City Center) in the 1930s. In addition, there was a performance in Berlin, Germany on September 5, 1938, by the Kulturbund, with the soprano Mascha Benya in one of the leading roles. It was conducted by violinist and conductor Chemjo Winawer. It was performed in a beautiful, huge 3,000-seat synagogue on Prinzregentenstrasse. (The Nazi party had banned the performance of Jewish works, even masterpieces, from being performed in a proper concert hall, so it was performed in a synagogue). Two months later this grand synagogue was destroyed on Kristallnacht. The artists fled to the US and survived but Kurt Singer, the illustrious head of the Kulturbund, which organized such concerts, could not escape in time and was murdered in Auschwitz.

His many other works include religious Jewish works; he set the Sabbath service to music in several versions. These works are still performed at Temple Emanu-el, a prominent Reform synagogue in Manhattan. He also composed many non-religious works. He was very interested in Lincoln's Gettysburg Address and set it to music for a chorus and in three other non-singing versions. Aaron Copland attended one of the Lincoln concerts prior to composing his own Lincoln Portrait.

He joined the music faculty of the New York College of Music in 1929 where he taught for many years and later joined the faculty at Hunter College. Weinberg died of lung disease in New York on 2 November 1956 at the age of 77. His remains are buried at the Stephen Wise Cemetery in Ardsley, New York.

Jacob Weinberg's widow, Theresa Bernstein Weinberg, was a brilliant woman who spoke four languages and raised their only child, Walter, when Jacob was pursuing his work. After Jacob's death, Theresa donated his music papers to Jacob Michael, the collector and philanthropist, whose foundation, in turn, donated the collection to the National Library of Israel, which is located on the campus of Hebrew University at Givat Ram, in Israel. There are over 10,000 pages in this archive, curated by its director, Dr. Gila Flam, a distinguished musicologist. Theresa Weinberg also donated a second large volume of Weinberg's musical scores, personal letters, academic papers, and photos to the archive at the Glinka Museum of Music in Moscow, at 4 Fedeeva St. These papers can be viewed by request. Among the Glinka collection are Jacob Weinberg's masterpiece "Sonata for Two Pianos", and "Encyclopedia of Piano Technique, Part I and Part II." His papers from his student days at the Moscow Conservatory of Music (1901-1906) are also donated here.

In addition to being Jacob's helpmate and supporter, Theresa Bernstein Weinberg was a gifted watercolor artist and avid maker of scrapbooks. In 1960 she formally signed a paper donating 67 scrapbooks of her clippings (of Jacob's work and also popular culture) to the NY Public Library system. These have yet to be found. Her grandchildren have been searching extensively for them. They are most likely in the basement storage areas of the NY Public Library at Bryant Park. Theresa died in 1962 and is interred at Ferncliff Cemetery, in Westchester County. (Another Ferncliff resident for eternity is Judy Garland.)

Jacob Weinberg's works continue to be enjoyed and performed today. His Klezmer works for clarinet, in particular, are widely performed. These include "Canzonetta" and "The Maypole". Weinberg was one of the in-house composers at Temple Emanu-el in Manhattan. His works are often performed during the High Holy days and during the weekly Sabbath services. Also, see YouTube for videos of contemporary performances of Jacob Weinberg's works. See the Milken Archives for some recordings of his works.

== Compositions ==
- Hechalutz (The Pioneers of Palestine) – Opus 18
- Sonata in E-flat major for Two Pianos
- Concerto #2 in C Major
- String Quartet – Opus 55
- Taps
- Romanze
- Jacob's Dream
- Canzonetta
- Speed Ahead (Perpetual Motion) for Violin and Piano – Op.31, No.2
- Kol Nidrei, op. 25.
- Suite for violoncello and piano
- Causerie
- The Cabalist
- The Maypole - Klezmer
- Rabbi Meir's Dance
- Trio on Hebrew Themes
- Prelude, Passacaglia and Finale, Op. 68. for piano
- Berceause Palestinienne (1929) for violin and piano

=== Opera ===
- The Pioneers (1924)

=== Oratorios ===
- Isaiah – An Oratorio
- The Life of Moses – An Oratorio

=== Choral ===
- I See A New America
- Gettysburg Address – 4 versions
- The Gettysburg address Abraham Lincoln's immortal words set for mixed voices, S.A.T.B.
- Shabbat ba'aretz (Sabbath in the Holy Land Service)
- Sabbath Evening Service
- Sabbath Morning Service (Shabath baarets), Op. 41. for cantor (baritone), mixed chorus and organ
- Sabbath Service
- Psalm 29 for cantor and congregation, or two antiphonal choirs (1951)

=== Songs ===
- Song for Heroes (1944) for voice and piano (lyrics by Nahum Ben-Horim)
- Six Hebrew songs for voice and piano
- From the Dead Sea Scrolls for baritone and piano

=== Arrangements ===
Rachmaniana for Two Pianos

== Discography ==
- 1938 - Shir Hakerem (Jacob Weinberg), Zvee Aroni and Helen Marie Stolz, 78 RPM RCA E2-KB-1531
- 1954 - Yo Adir (Jacob Weinberg), Sidor Belarsky, 33 RPM, RCA Victor LPM-3197 (E3VL-4989)
- 1969 - Yankl Der Shmid ("Jacob the Blacksmith"), Dovid Pinski - Jacob Weinberg, Moishe Oysher, 33 RPM, The Greater Recording GRC 154
- 1977 - Berceause Palestinienne (Jacob Weinberg) David Sella & Paul Posnak, 33 RPM, Musique Internationale M-7504
- 2004 - Klezmer Concertos and Encores The Maypole, Canzonetta (Jacob Weinberg), Naxos 8559403
- 2005 - Weinberg: Piano Concerto No. 2, String Quartet Op. 55, Shabbat Ba'aretz - American Classics, Naxos 8559457
