= Baruch Leib Rosowsky =

Latvian singer

- Born: 1841; Riga, Governorate of Livonia Russian Empire
- Died: 1919 (aged 77–78); Unknown
- Occupations: Famous Cantor, Composer; Oberkantor, Riga, 1871-1919
- Children: Solomon Rosowsky, Famous Cantor & Composer

Baruch Leib Rosowsky (Latvian: Baruhs Leibs Rozovskis, 1841 – 1919) was a famous cantor of the Great Choral Synagogue in Riga and a composer of religious music in Riga, at the time a city in Imperial Russia. Rosowsky's time of death was during the Latvian War of Independence. His son was also a famous cantor, named Solomon Rosowsky. It is likely that Rosowsky's family is related to the Rasofsky branch of the Barney Ross family.

== Notable Relatives ==
- Yuri Rasovsky
- Solomon Rosowsky
- Barney Ross
