= Jewish art music movement =

The Jewish art music movement began at the end of the 19th century in Russia, with a group of Russian Jewish classical composers dedicated to preserving Jewish folk music and creating a new, characteristically Jewish genre of classical music. The music it produced used Western classical elements, featuring the rich chromatic harmonies of Russian late Romantic music, but with melodic, rhythmic and textual content taken from traditional Jewish folk or liturgical music. The group founded the St. Petersburg Society for Jewish Folk Music, a movement that spread to Moscow, Poland, Austria, and later Palestine and the United States. Although the original society existed formally for only 10 years (from 1908 to 1918), its impact on the course of Jewish music was profound. The society, and the art music movement it fostered, inspired a new interest in the music of Eastern European Jewry throughout Europe and America. It laid the foundations for the Jewish music and Klezmer revival in the United States, and was a key influence in the development of Israeli folk and classical music.

With the outbreak of World War I and the rise of Communism in Russia, most of the composers active in the Jewish art music movement fled Eastern Europe, finding their way to Palestine or America. There, they became leaders of the Jewish musical communities, composing for both the synagogue and the concert hall.

== Origins ==
The interest in Jewish national music coincided with the nationalist trends in music throughout Eastern Europe. In Russia, composers led by Rimsky-Korsakov, were composing new works based on Russian folk themes. In Hungary, Zoltán Kodály and later Béla Bartók undertook a massive project of recording and cataloging folk melodies, and incorporating them into their compositions. Other composers such as Antonín Dvořák and Leoš Janáček were increasingly seeking a uniquely national sound in their work. "Europe was impelled by the Romantic tendency to establish in musical matters the national boundaries more and more sharply," wrote Alfred Einstein. "The collecting and sifting of old traditional melodic treasures ... formed the basis for a creative art-music."

Parallel with this trend toward national music styles was an awakening of nationalist sentiment among the Jews of Russia and Eastern Europe. Long subjected to severe restrictions on their lives, outbursts of violent antisemitic pogroms, and forced concentration in a segregated region of Russia called the Pale of Settlement, Russian Jewry developed an intense nationalist identity during the 1880s onward. This identity gave rise to a number of political movements - the Zionist movement, which advocated emigration from Russia to Palestine, and the Bund, which sought cultural equality and autonomy within Russia. There was a flowering of Yiddish literature, with authors like Sholem Aleichem, Mendele Mocher Sforim and others. A Yiddish theater movement started, and numerous Yiddish newspapers and periodicals were published.

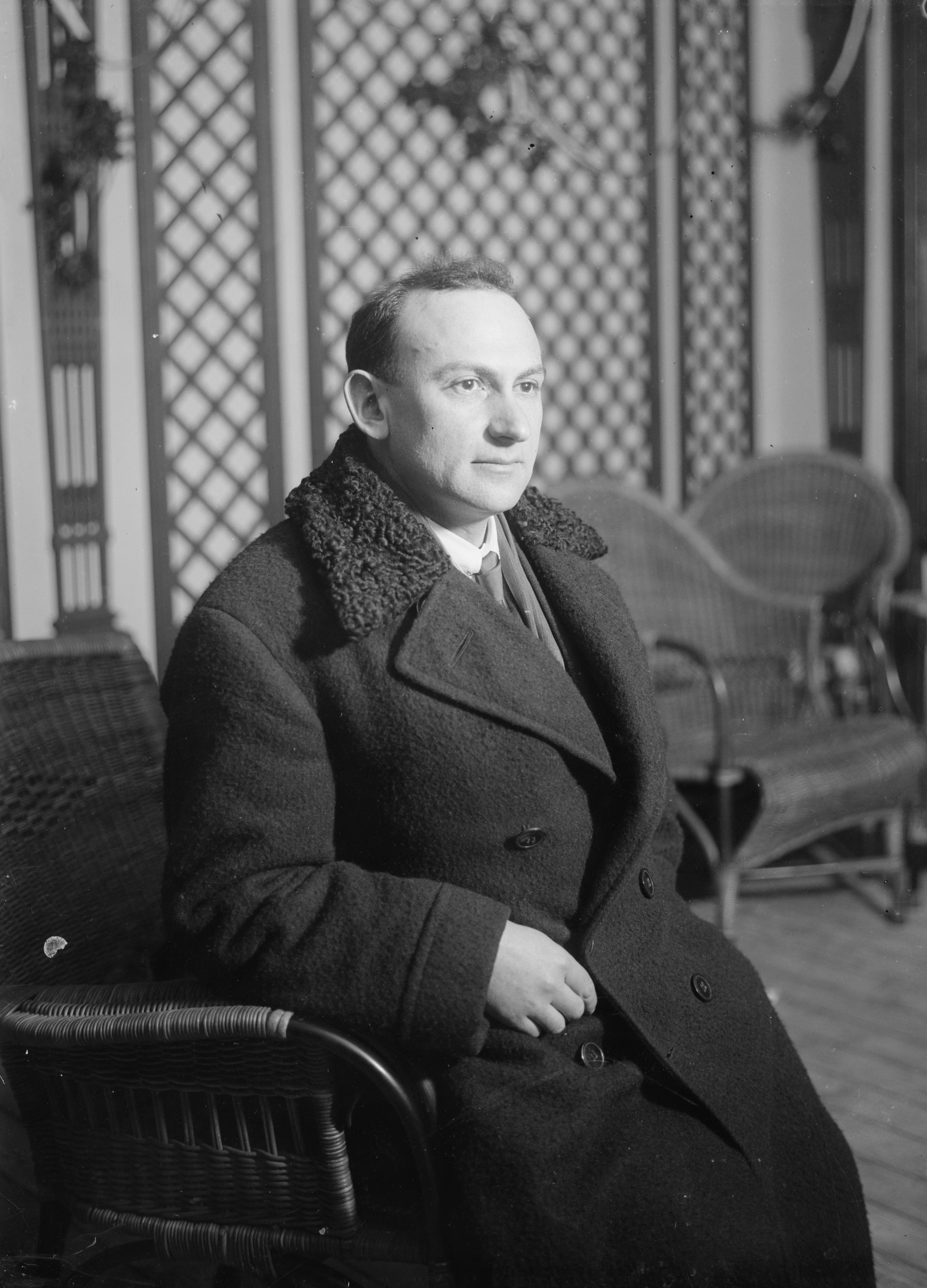
Violinist Joseph Achron

In spite of the restrictions on residency and quotas on Jewish students in universities, many Russian Jews enrolled as music students at the St. Petersburg and Moscow Conservatories. These included violinist Joseph Achron, composer Mikhail Gnesin, and others. Many of the great violinists of the last century — Jascha Heifetz, Nathan Milstein, Efrem Zimbalist, Mischa Elman, to name a few — were Jewish students of Leopold Auer, who taught at the conservatory.

While many of these students came from orthodox Jewish backgrounds — Achron, for example, was son of a cantor — their studies of music at the conservatory were strictly of the western classical tradition. However, the rise of nationalism in Russian music also awakened an incipient interest in Jewish music. In 1895, Yiddish writer Y.L. Peretz started collecting lyrics of Yiddish folksongs. Abraham Goldfaden, founder of the Yiddish theater in Russia, incorporated many folksongs and folk style music in his productions. In 1898, two Jewish historians, Saul Ginsburg and Pesach Marek, embarked on the first effort to create an anthology of Jewish folk music.

The main catalyzer of the movement for national Jewish music, however, was Joel Engel. Engel, composer and music critic, was born outside the Pale of Jewish settlement, and was a completely assimilated Russian. A meeting with the Russian nationalist critic Vladimir Stasov inspired Engel to seek his Jewish roots. "(Stasov's) words struck Engel's imagination like lightning, and the Jew awoke in him," wrote Engel's friend and fellow composer Jacob Weinberg, a Russian-Jewish composer and concert pianist (1879–1956) who joined the Moscow branch of the Society of Jewish Folk Music. Weinberg eventually migrated to Palestine where he wrote the first Hebrew opera, "The Pioneers" (Hechalutz) in 1924. Engel set out to study the folk music of the Jews of the Russian shtetls, spending the summer of 1897 traveling throughout the Pale, listening to and notating Yiddish songs. In 1900, he issued an album of ten Jewish songs, and presented a lecture concert of Jewish folk music.

== The St. Petersburg Society for Jewish Folk Music ==
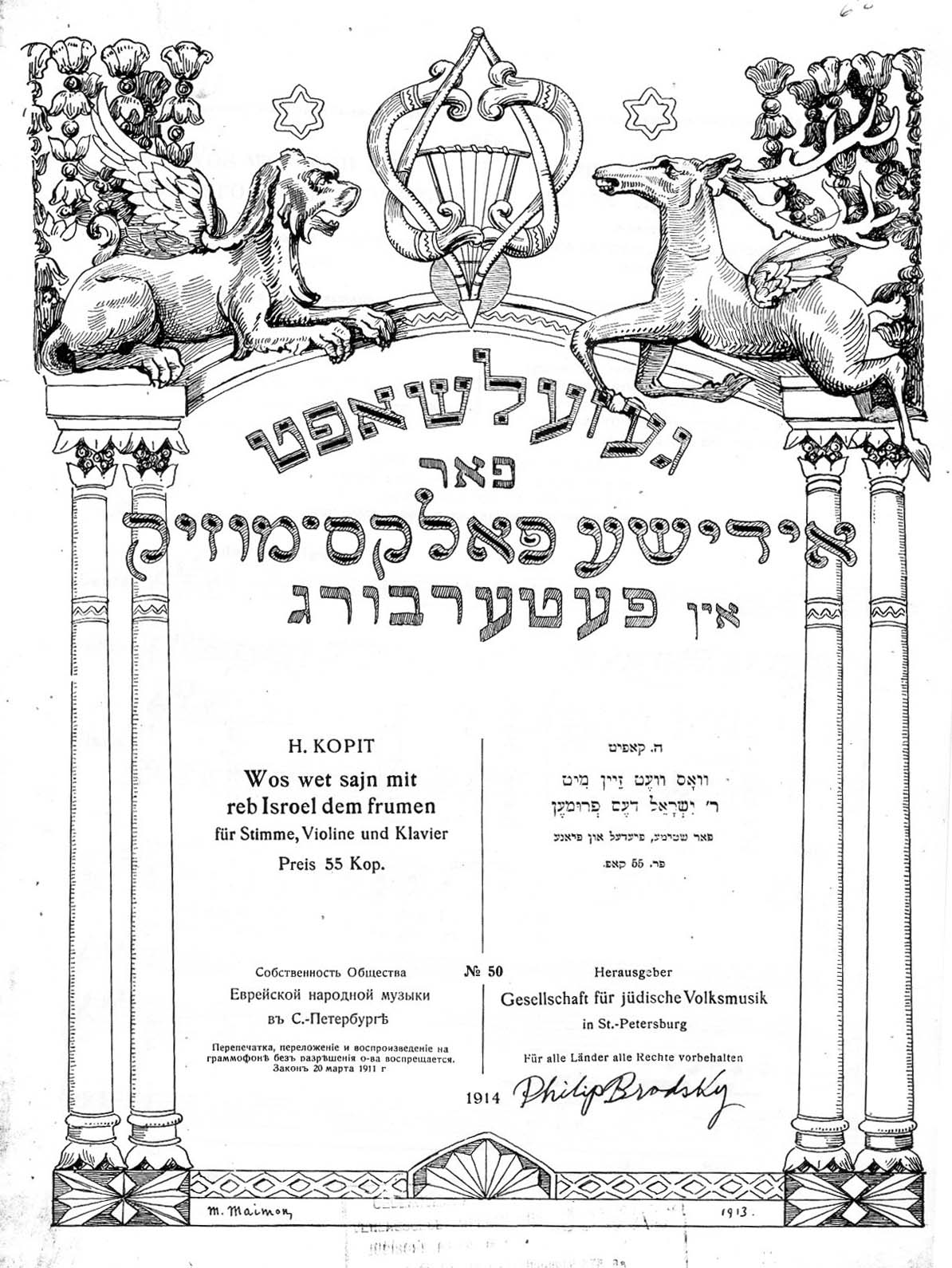
A composition by H. Kopit, published by the Society. The cover sheet shows the logo that appeared on the Society's publications: a star of David enclosing a harp, flanked by a winged lion and a deer, recalling the Biblical verse "Strong as a lion, quick as a deer."

In 1908, Engel and a group of like-minded musicians from the Petersburg conservatory, (including Lazare Saminsky), founded the "St. Petersburg Society for Jewish Folk Music." The objectives of the society were to develop Jewish music "by collecting folksongs ... and supporting Jewish composers," and to publish compositions and research on Jewish music.

The society produced concerts, primarily of arrangements of folk melodies for various ensembles, and published arrangements and original compositions by its members. These included the composers Solomon Rosowsky, Alexander Krein, Lyubov Streicher, Mikhail Gnessin, Grigory Kompaneyets, and the violinist Joseph Achron.

With the growing nationalist and Zionist sentiment among the Jewish population, these concerts were received enthusiastically. In a concert in the Ukrainian city of Vinnytsia, for example, "the artists were met at the train and paraded through the Jewish part of the city with great ceremony and enthusiasm," recollected the local cantor. Among the artists performing in these concerts were violinists Jascha Heifetz and Efrem Zimbalist, cellist Joseph Press and the bass Feodor Chaliapin.

In 1912, the society sponsored the Jewish Ethnographic Expedition that included the Yiddish musician and educator Sussman Kisselgoff, to record Jewish folk music using the newly invented Edison phonograph. The group recorded more than 1000 wax cylinders. The collection is preserved in the Vernadsky National Library of Ukraine, in Kyiv. This collection is one of the most important ethnographic resources of Jewish life in Ukraine from that period. Another important endeavour of the society was the publication of a "Song Collection for Jewish Schools and Home." This songbook was a monumental six volumes, and includes, in addition to folksongs collected by Kisselgoff and others, original art songs and a section on cantillation of religious texts.

== Jewish art music outside Russia ==
The success of the society spread throughout Russia, and into eastern and central Europe. In 1913, a branch was founded in Kharkov, and later in Moscow and Odessa. The advent of World War I and the Russian Revolution put an end to the formal existence of the society, but its members continued their activities and influence in Russia and abroad. Polish Jewish musicians such as Janot Rotkin, inspired by the society, embarked on their own projects of gathering, arranging, and composing Jewish music. In 1928, the Society for the Promotion of Jewish Music was founded in Vienna.

With the onset of the Russian revolution, most of the leading members of the St. Petersburg society left Russia. Joel Engel moved to Berlin in 1922, where he established the Juwal Publishing house. There he republished many of the society's works. Two years later he moved to Palestine, and started Jibneh, which continued the publishing work of Juwal. He died in Israel in 1927. A street in Tel Aviv now bears his name. Lazare Saminsky emigrated to the U.S. in 1920, where he became a leading figure in the promotion of Jewish music. He was music director of the Temple Emanu-El reform congregation in New York, a position he held until his death, in 1959.

In a similar manner, the lyric basso Sidor Belarsky left Russia in 1930 after completing his studies at the St. Petersburg Conservatory and acquired a faculty position at Brigham Young University where he continued to pursue scholarly research in to Judaic folk music.

In 1932, Miriam Zunser, together with Saminsky, Joseph Yasser and others, founded MAILAMM (known by its Hebrew acronym), an institute for the study and promotion of Jewish music in Palestine and the United States; it was one of the predecessor organizations to the American Society for Jewish Music, which formed under that name in 1974.

Solomon Rosowsky moved to Israel, and later to the United States, where he continued composing, teaching and researching Jewish music.

Jacob Weinberg moved to Israel in 1922 after being persecuted in Odessa by the Bolsheviks. In 1927 his opera "The Pioneers" won first prize in the Sesquicentennial composition contest. With the prize money, he was able to migrate to New York. His religious works were performed in New York City at Temple Emanuel, (where he became a "house composer"), as well as the Park Avenue Synagogue and the 92nd St. Y. He joined the music faculty of Hunter College and the (now defunct) NY College of Music. He continued to compose, perform, and teach. His comic opera, "The Pioneers" ("Hechalutz") (1924) was performed in concerts at Carnegie Hall in February, 1941 and again in February, 1947, and in the 1930s at City Center (then called "The Mecca Temple", with its Moorish architecture). It was also performed in Berlin in the 1930s by the Kulturbund, featuring the great soprano Mascha Benya. Her aria "Song of Solomon" was more recently performed in 1998 by soprano Harolyn Blackwell at Lincoln Center's Avery Fisher Hall in a gala "Salute to Israel's 50th Birthday" concert conducted by Leon Botstein with the American Symphony Orchestra. A production of "The Pioneers" is planned for Brooklyn College in the fall, 2015 to celebrate the opening of their new performing arts center. A concert version of this opera was produced by his granddaughter, Ellen L. Weinberg, in NYC in 2012 and can be seen on YouTube.

== See also ==
- Jewish art
