= Joseph Yasser =

American organist and music theorist (1893–1981)

- Born: April 16, 1893; Łódź, Congress Poland, Russian Empire
- Died: September 6, 1981 (aged 88); New York City, U.S.
- Occupation: Musicologist
- Years active: 1918–1981

Joseph Yasser (April 16, 1893 – September 6, 1981) was a Russian–American organist, music theorist, author, and musicologist. An influential figure who established a handful of musical institutions, Yasser is noted for his 1932 publication, A Theory of Evolving Tonality. He was active until his death at age 88 in 1981. Yasser was married but had no children.

== Early life and career ==
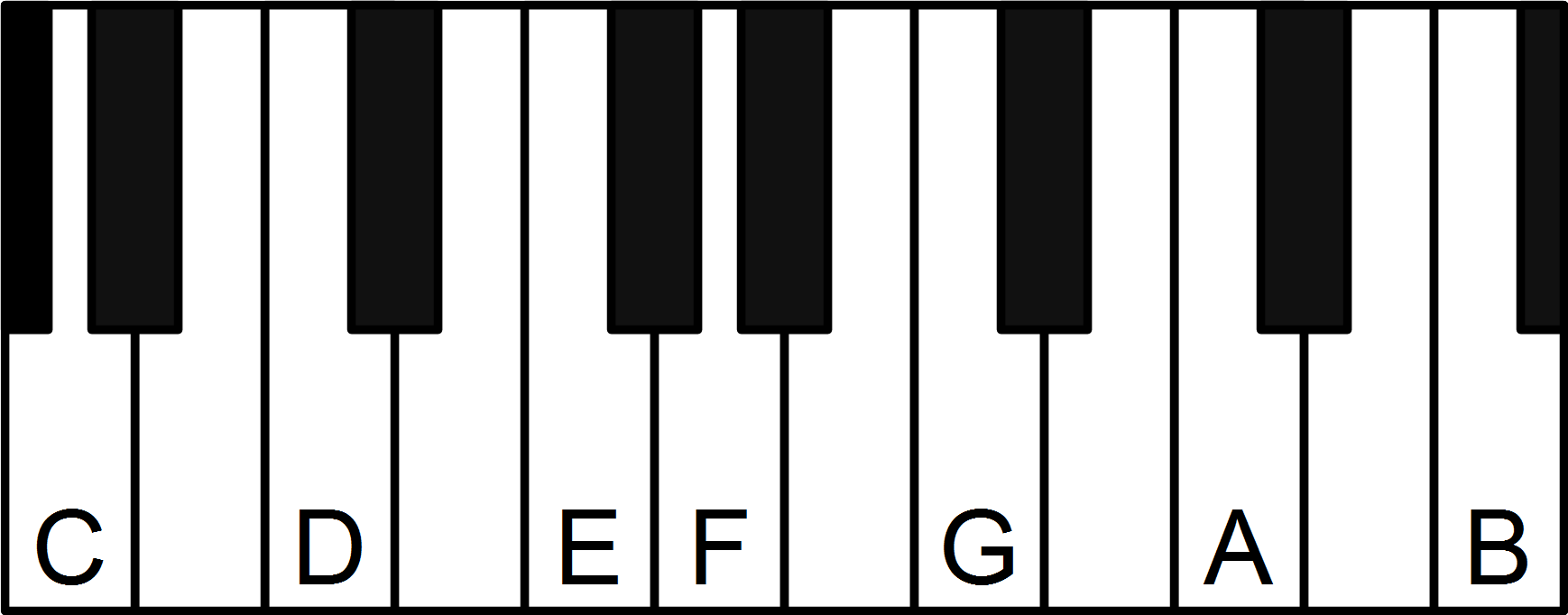
Yasser's 19 equal temperament keyboard layout Note the twelve white supra-diatonic keys and seven infra-diatonic black keys.

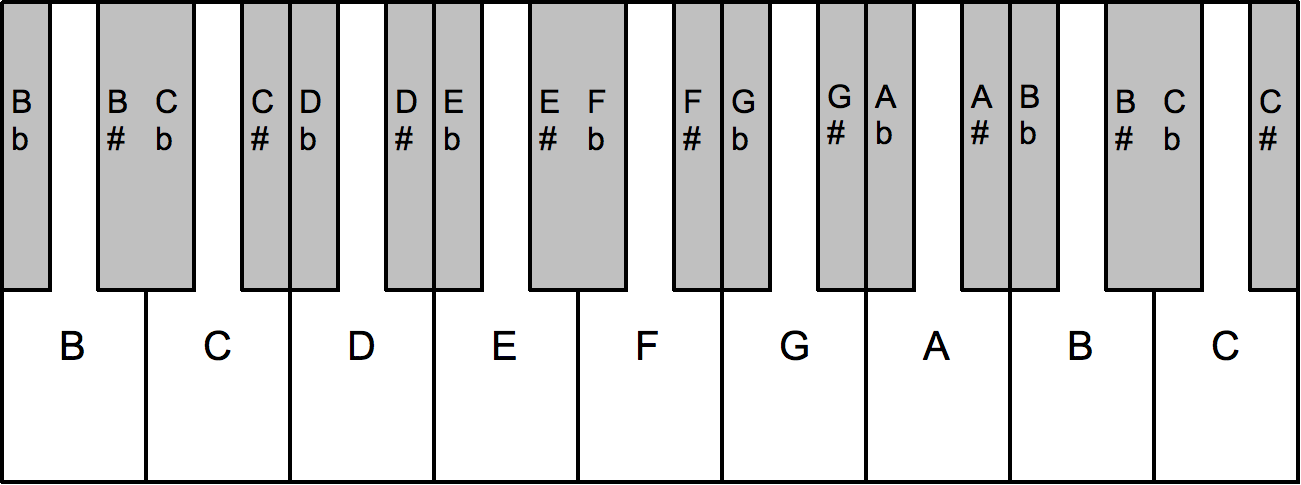
For comparison, a 19 equal temperament keyboard, after Woolhouse (1835) and Easley Blackwood Jr. with seven white diatonic keys and twelve black keys

Yasser was born in Łódź, Poland (then part of the Russian Empire), on April 16, 1893. He studied piano in Moscow with renowned pianist-cum-composer Jacob Weinberg and from 1912 to 1917 enrolled at the Moscow Conservatory, graduating with honors. In 1918 Yasser succeeded B. Sabaneev as leader of the school's organ department. In 1919 he was named chief organist of the Imperial Opera (Bolshoi Theatre), and in 1920 and 1921 toured Siberia with a state quartet as a pianist and lecturer. In 1921 Yasser moved to Shanghai, China, directing the "Shanghai Songsters" choral society and performing in concert, including as a member of a piano quintet which he formed.

In 1923 he moved to the United States, where he studied musical tuning and Jewish, and Russian music. Particularly interested in the Chinese organ, Yasser continued as a Chinese music lecturer in the United States. He served as organist and choir director at Congregation Rodeph Sholom from 1929 to 1960.

Yasser was a co-founder, along with Charles Seeger, of the American Library of Musicology in 1931, co-founder of the American Musicological Society in 1934, and collector and advocate of Jewish and Jewish-American music. In the 1960s, Yasser published The magrepha of the Herodian temple: A five-fold hypothesis in which he opined that the mysterious magrepha, an integral part of ancient Jewish rituals, was "not a musical instrument in the modern sense, and much less an organ" but instead a digging tool. However, he may be best known as the author of A Theory of Evolving Tonality (1932) and advocate of progressive equal temperaments; Yasser wrote music in 19 equal temperament. He supported the use of the musical interval measurements, namely the decitone, centitone, and millitone.

In a series of articles from 1937 to 1938, which were later compiled into a book titled Medieval Quartal Harmony, published by the American Library of Musicology, he proposed the implementation of a system "harmonizing pentatonic melodies" based upon the perfect fourth interval. From 1944 till its closure in 1980, Yasser frequently participated in activities organised by the New York-based National Jewish Music Council, founded to raise awareness on Jewish music. From 1951 to around 1960, he lectured at the Jewish Theological Seminary's Cantors Institute, specialising in the theory and history of Jewish music. He was hailed as an "important mentor to younger students". Yasser was a contributor to Novoye Russkoye Slovo (New Russian Word), a Russian daily, and wrote about various topics in music.

== Personal life ==
According to protégé Herman Berlinski, in his final years Joseph Yasser was a "recluse" who avoided prolonged periods outdoors due to an anaphylactic reaction to a wasp sting which he experienced in the early 1960s. Nonetheless, he was active as a musicologist until his death, although the frequency of activity decreased. In his old age, he was reportedly still mentally sharp. Married with no children, Yasser died on September 6, 1981, in New York City, aged 88. His spouse Marie died two years later, in 1983.
