= Leo Zeitlin =

Russian composer

Lev Mordukhovich Tseitlin (Russian: Лев Цейтлин, Yiddish: לייב צייטלין "Leyb Tseytlin", born 1884, in Pinsk – July 8, 1930, in New York City), known as Leo Zeitlin, was a Russian-Jewish composer. In 1923, he emigrated to the United States. His best-known work is Eli Zion, a paraphrase for piano and cello "on a folk theme and trope of 'Song of Songs'".

== Life ==
Zeitlin was a violinist, violist, conductor and impresario who was active in Saint Petersburg's Society for Jewish Folk Music. In 1923, shortly after he arrived in New York City with his wife Esther from the Free City of Danzig, he became the violist and arranger for the Capitol Theatre.

In 1925, he began arranging orchestral and small ensemble pieces for the Capitol's radio program on WEAF, which in 1926 became the flagship station of the NBC Red Network. Beginning in 1926, the series of light classical concerts titled Capitol Theatre was broadcast by the NBC Red Network on Sunday evenings from 7:20pm to 9:15pm. This series continued until 1929, not long before Zeitlin's death.

In an article written by Paula Eisenstein Baker and published in Pro Musica Hebraica, Zeitlin is described as "one of the most important Russian Jewish composers to resurface, after decades of neglect, as a leading figure in the history of twentieth-century Jewish art music." According to this source, all of Zeitlin's known chamber works were included in a print volume in 2008.

== Works (selection) ==
- Eli Zion (Paraphrase on a folk theme and trop of "Song of Songs"), for cello & piano
- Palestina (Rhapsody on Hebrew Themes)https://www.areditions.com/zeitlin-palestina-a076.html
- Five Songs from the Yiddish
- Ad ono adoynoy, for mezzo-soprano & string quartet
- Benk ikh yo, benk ikh nit?, dramatic recitation for voice & piano
- Berceuse (A mayse), transcription for mezzo-soprano & string quartet
- Der kadish fun reb Leyvi-Yitskhok, for mezzo-soprano, string quartet & piano
- Der parom, for mezzo-soprano, violin, viola & piano (after Shkliar)
- Eyli, eyli, for mezzo-soprano & string quartet
- Gebet afun rabbi leyvi-Yitskhok, for mezzo-soprano, violin, viola, cello & piano
- Iber di hoyfn, for mezzo-soprano, baritone & string quartet
- Klezmorimlekh, arrangement for mezzo-soprano, violin, viola & piano (after Shalyt)
- More, dramatic recitation for voice & piano
- Patsh, patsh, kikhelekh, for mezzo-soprano, string quartet & piano (after Saminsky)
- Reb Nakhmons nign, for string quintet
- Shoyn nito der nekhtn, for mezzo-soprano, string quartet & piano (after Shalyt)
- Tsien zikh khmares oyf, harts mayns, dramatic recitation for voice & piano
- Wiener Volkslied (Du alter Stefansturm), for string quartet (after F. Kreisler)
- Zay, zeyde, mispalel far undz dayne kinder, dramatic recitation for voice & piano
- Zog zhe, rebenyu, for mezzo-soprano, baritone & piano

== Bibliography ==
- Paula Eisenstein Baker (ed.): Leo Zeitlin, Chamber Music (A-R Editions, Inc., 2008) https://www.areditions.com/zeitlin-chamber-music-n051.html
- Paula Eisenstein Baker (ed.): Leo Zeitlin, Palestina (A-R Editions, Inc., 2014)https://www.areditions.com/zeitlin-palestina-a076.html
