= Lyubov Streicher =

Russian composer (1888–1958)

Lyubov Lvovna Streicher (3 March 1888 – 31 March 1958) was a Russian composer, teacher and violinist. She was a founding member of the Society for Jewish Folk Music.

Streicher was born in Vladikavkaz. She graduated from the St. Petersburg Conservatory, where she studied with Leopold Auer, Mikhail Gnessin, Anatoly Lyadov, and Maximilian Steinberg. In 1908, she joined Gnessin and Lazare Saminsky as founding members of the Society for Jewish Folk Music in St. Petersburg. The Society was part of the Jewish art music movement. It promoted Jewish folk music through research, composition, performance, and publishing. Branches of the Society were established in several Russian cities, and it remained active through 1919.

== Compositions ==
At least one of Streicher's compositions, "A Simple Soviet Man," was recorded commercially by pianist Maria Yudina in 1937. Streicher’s compositions included:

=== Ballet ===
Noch Fialki

=== Chamber ===
Armenian String Quartet

Improvisation (cello and piano)

Sonata (cello and piano)

String Quartet

Suite (string quartet)

Suite on Folk Themes of the Peoples of the Soviet Union (string quartet)

=== Operetta ===
Chasi (for children; text by Elizaveta Polonskaya)

=== Orchestra ===
Jewish Poem

Zhenshchina Vostoka (chorus and orchestra; text by Elizaveta Polonskaya)

=== Piano ===
Six Pieces

Sonata

Twelve Children’s Pieces on Folk Themes of the USSR

=== Vocal ===
"A Simple Soviet Man" (with Sergey Germanov; lyrics by Vasily Lebedev-Kumach )

"Klyatva" (text by Elizaveta Polonskaya)

Romances (text by Fyodor Tyuchev and Paul Verlaine)

Seven Poems from Eugene Onegin (text by Alexander Pushkin)

"Shir Hashirim"

"Song of Songs"

Ten Jewish Work Songs

"Ya Lesom Shia"
