= Solomon Rosowsky =

Latvian cantor and composer (1878–1962)

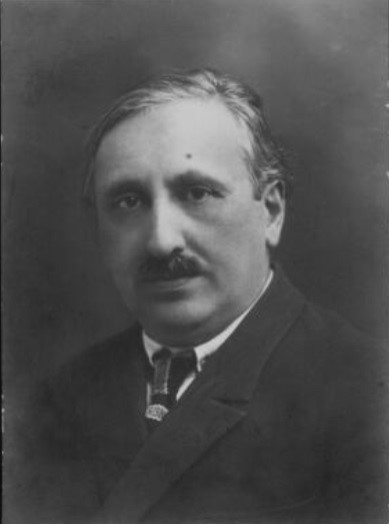
Solomon Rosowsky

Solomon (Salomo) Rosowsky (1878, Riga –1962) was a cantor (hazzan) and composer, and son of the Rigan cantor, Baruch Leib Rosowsky.

== Early life ==
Rosowsky began to study music only after he graduated from the University of Kiev, with a degree in law. Among his teachers at the St. Petersburg Conservatory was Rimsky-Korsakov. Together with the pianist Leonid Nesvishsky (Arie Abilea), the singer Joseph Tomars, the composer Lazare Saminsky, and several other musicians Rosowsky organized the Society for Jewish Folk Music in 1908. In 1918 he became music director of the Jewish Art Theater (GOSET).

== Professional career ==
Rosowsky returned to Riga in 1920 and founded the first Jewish Conservatory there. After a five-year stay, he left for Israel, where at that time he at first was one of the few professional musicians. The folk music of Israeli Jews became a major new inspiration for his compositions. Despite the enthusiastic work of the pioneers, the material living conditions in Palestine at that time were still extremely arduous. And for an artist who was used to the rich musical life of St. Petersburg, the land had little to offer in those early days except for a few amateur orchestras and two music schools. However, Rosowsky stayed on. He composed stage music for the workers' theater "Ohel", gave lessons and began his path-breaking research into the music of the Bible, which later made his name known all over the world. He even tried, together with David Schor and David Mirenburg, to continue the concert activities of the New Jewish School, founding the music society "Hanigun".

== Later years ==
His latter years he spent in New York, where he taught at the Cantors' Institute of the Jewish Theological Seminary. His magnum opus, "The Cantillation of the Bible: Five Books of Moses", was published in 1957.

== Publications ==
- "The Cantillation of the Bible: Five Books of Moses", published 1957

== See also ==
=== Notable Relatives ===
- Yuri Rasovsky
- Barney Ross
- Baruch Leib Rosowsky
