= Lazare Saminsky =

Russian composer (1882–1959)

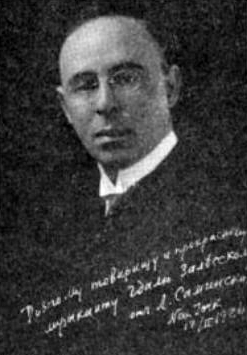
- Born: Lazar Semyonovich Saminsky; 8 November 1882; Valehotsulove, Russian Empire
- Died: 30 June 1959 (aged 76); Port Chester, New York, US
- Education: Odessa conservatoire St.Petersburg
- Occupations: Performer; conductor; composer

Lazare Saminsky (born Lazar Semyonovich Saminsky; Russian: Лазарь (Элиэзер) Семенович Саминский; 8 November [O.S. 27 October] 1882 – 30 June 1959) was a Russian-American performer, conductor and composer, especially of Jewish music.

== Life ==
Born to a merchant family in Valehotsulove (now Dolynske), near Odessa, Saminsky received a broad education in the arts, sciences and languages. He studied music at the Odessa Conservatoire from 1903–1905, and then went to Moscow, where he studied mathematics and philosophy as well as music. Expelled for his participation in the student protests of 1905, he went to St.Petersburg, where he studied with Nikolai Rimsky-Korsakov, Anatoly Lyadov, and Nikolai Tcherepnin.

While still a student he became a founder member, with Mikhail Gnesin, Lyubov Streicher, and others, of the 'Society for Jewish Folk Music'. He wrote music for the Society and helped organise its earliest publication. He continued an active member, even though from 1911 to 1918 he lived in Tbilisi, where he also interested himself in Georgian and Armenian music, and from 1917 to 1918 he was head of the conservatory. During this period he also wrote an opera Tsar Yulian (Emperor Julian) (which he later destroyed), and researched Jewish music of the Caucasian region. He was particularly interested in styles of cantillation (nigun).

In 1919 Saminsky left the Soviet Union and travelled to France and England, where he gave recitals of Russian and Jewish music, and led a ballet season at the Duke of York's Theatre in London, where he married the poet Lillian Morgan (1893–1945). In December 1920 he left to settle in the United States, where he was active as a composer, conductor and organiser of musical events. In 1922 he became a board member of the International Composers Guild. In 1924 he was awarded a MacDowell fellowship, working in the Monday Music Studio. From 1924 he was music director of the Temple Emanu-El Synagogue in New York City. For the synagogue he composed music for the Sabbath and Holiday services, also commissioning work from other Jewish composers including Joseph Achron and Isadore Freed.

Saminsky's major compositions include the First and Second Hebrew Song Cycles, Opp. 12 and 13 (written in 1914, published New York, 1922, text in Yiddish), songs, choral works, and piano pieces.

Saminsky wrote numerous books on Jewish music, contemporary music, and conducting.

He died in Port Chester, New York on 30 June 1959.

== Works ==
- Operas: The Vision of Ariel (1916), Gagliarda of a Merry Plague (1925), The Daughter of Jepta (1929), Julian, the Apostate Caesar (1933–38),
- Symphonies: No. 1, "Of the Great Rivers" (1914); No. 2, "Symphonie des Sommets" (1918); No. 3, "Symphony of the Seas" (1924); No. 4 (1927); No. 5, "Jerusalem, City of Solomon and Christ", for chorus and orchestra (1932)
- Orchestra: Vigiliae; Lament of Rachel; Venice; Ausonia; Three Shadows, Poems for Orchestra; Pueblo, A Moon Epic; Stilled Pageants
- Solo with Orchestra: The Vow - Rhapsodic Variations for Piano and Orchestra (1917; rev. 1943); East and West, Suite for Violin and Orchestra
- Vocal/Choral: To Zion, a Choral Fantasy; 4 Sacred Choruses; 10 Hebrew Folksongs and Folk Dances; 3 Hebrew Song Cycles; 6 Songs of the Russian Orient; Requiem, in memory of Lillian Saminsky; Sabbath Morning Service; Holiday Service; By the Rivers of Babylon

== Sound ==
- Shir hashirim (Song of songs) by Saminsky, sung by Emma Schaver

== Recording ==
The Vow - Rhapsodic Variations for Piano and Orchestra (Barry Goldsmith/Royal Scottish National Orchestra/David Amos), CD, Kleos Classics (2005)

== Sources ==
- Grove Music Online, Saminsky, Lazare
- Beate Schröder-Nauenburg, Der Eintritt des Jüdischen in die Welt der Kunstmusik, Wiesbaden: Harrassowitz, 2007, pp. 151–208. ISBN 978-3-447-05603-8
- Baker's Biographical Dictionary of Musicians (Revised by Nicolas Slonimsky), G. Schirmer, NY, 1958, Saminsky, Lazare
