= Mikhail Gnessin =

Russian composer (1883–1957)

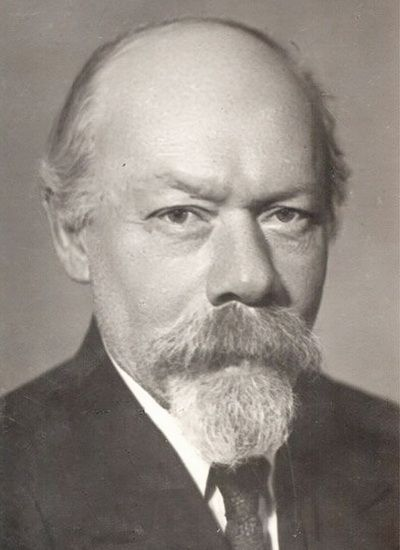
- Gnessin in 1946
- Born: 2 February 1883; Rostov-on-Don, Russian Empire
- Died: 5 May 1957 (aged 74); Moscow, Soviet Union
- Burial place: Novodevichy Cemetery
- Education: Rostov Technical Institute
- Occupations: Composer; teacher

Mikhail Fabianovich Gnessin (or Gnesin; Russian: Михаил Фабианович Гнесин; 2 February [O.S. 21 January] 1883 – 5 May 1957) was a Russian Jewish composer and teacher. Gnessin's works The Maccabeans and The Youth of Abraham earned him the nickname "the Jewish Glinka".

== Early life and education ==
Gnessin was born in Rostov-on-Don, Russia, the son of Rabbi Fabian Osipovich Gnessin and Bella Isaevna Fletzinger. His grandfather Y'shayah was also a famous singer and Badchen (wedding entertainer) in Vilnius. Each of the Gnessin children appears to have possessed musical talent, and Gnessin's three elder sisters, Evgenia, Elena and Maria, all graduated with distinction from the Moscow Conservatory. His sisters went on to found the Gnessin State Musical College (now the Gnessin Russian Academy of Music), an elite music school in Moscow in 1895.

Gnessin studied from 1892 to 1899 at the Rostov Technical Institute. In 1901, he entered the St. Petersburg Conservatory where he studied under Nikolai Rimsky-Korsakov, Alexander Glazunov and Anatoly Lyadov. In 1905 he was expelled for taking part in a student strike during the Revolution of 1905. He was reinstated the following year. In 1908 his early work Vrubel won the Glinka Prize. That same year he helped found, along with Lazare Saminsky, Lyubov Streicher, and others, the Society for Jewish Folk Music. During this period Gnessin continued to take part in socialist activities, teaching music to factory workers at workmen's clubs.

Among Gnessin's other early works was a "symphonic fragment" (his Op. 4), based on Shelley's poem Prometheus Unbound. But much of his work at this time, and in the future, was associated with Jewish traditional musical styles which had become increasingly popular in Russia prior to 1914.

Just prior to the Revolution, Jewish music and musicians in Russia were experiencing a nationalist boom. Figures such as Rimsky-Korsakov and Stasov were actively encouraging the establishment of such a school...both Tsarist and Soviet authorities were not too happy about this development, and gave grudging permission for the folk side of Jewish culture to be established, rather than an openly Jewish nationalist compositional movement. Paradoxically, the number of Jewish performers within Russian culture was huge, and included many world-famous names.

In 1911, Gnessin traveled abroad, studying in Berlin and Paris. He then spent a year (1912–1913) studying at Vsevolod Meyerhold's studio in St. Petersburg. In 1913, Meyerhold opened a small theatrical school known as Dr. Dapertutto's Studio. In return for a nominal fee students were provided classes in theatre history, commedia dell'arte, Scenic Movement, and practical music and speech. The latter class was taught by Gnessin.

Actors in Dr Dapertutto's Studio in St Petersburg learned "musicality", and the voice and speech work was incorporated into a course called "The Musical Interpretation of Drama", taught by the composer Mikhail Gnessin. Gnessin included in his classes simple and complex forms of choral speech and plenty of singing, and indeed he analysed speech as song, so that actors often sang longer speeches for an exercise.

Later that year Gnessin returned to Rostov, where he continued to teach. He remained there until 1923.

Igor Stravinsky, who knew Gnessin prior to the Revolution of 1917, described him years later:

Gnessin himself was a striking character. He dressed as an Orthodox Hebrew, but at the same time was identified with radically anti-sectarian political and social views. I once sent him a note, after we had dined together, saying that I was delighted by our "sympathetic understanding." He answered me in a surprised and slightly shocked tone saying that he was sorry but I had been mistaken; he had felt no such sympathy. That was typical of Gnessin and, I suppose, it explains why I remember him.

== After the Revolution ==
After the Revolution, Gnessin and his music, initially, fared quite well. Traditional Jewish art, including music, flourished during this period, and a Jewish nationalist school of music was encouraged by the new Soviet government. Gnessin produced several works during this period, among them: Songs from the Old Country (1919); The Maccabees (1921); The Youth of Abraham (1922); Song of Songs (1922); The Jewish Orchestra at the Ball of the Town Bailiff (1926); Red-Headed Motele (1926–1929); Ten Jewish Songs (1927).

Pursuing his interest in traditional Jewish music, Gnessin traveled to Palestine in 1914, and again, in 1921. During the latter visit he "secluded himself for a few months in the wild mountain scenery of Bab al Wad," where he composed the first act of his opera The Youth of Abraham. He briefly considered emigrating to Palestine, but became "disenchanted" and returned to the Soviet Union.

Author and music critic David Ewen wrote, in Composers Today:

There is fire and madness in this music; the rhythms rush in every direction, like winds in a hurricane. But there is a shimmering background to all this chaos; a poignant voice in all this outburst. One hears in this music the strange pathos of the Hebrews. The same pathos with which Isaiah warned his beloved race of a pending and inevitable doom, the same pathos with which Israel thinks about its long exile in unfriendly countries – that same pathos is to be found in Gnessin's operas.

His teaching career also flourished. From 1923 to 1935, Gnessin taught at the Gnessin Institute; he was simultaneously employed as Professor of Composition at the Moscow Conservatory from 1925 to 1936. In 1945, Gnessin became head of the Gnessin Institute.

== Later career ==
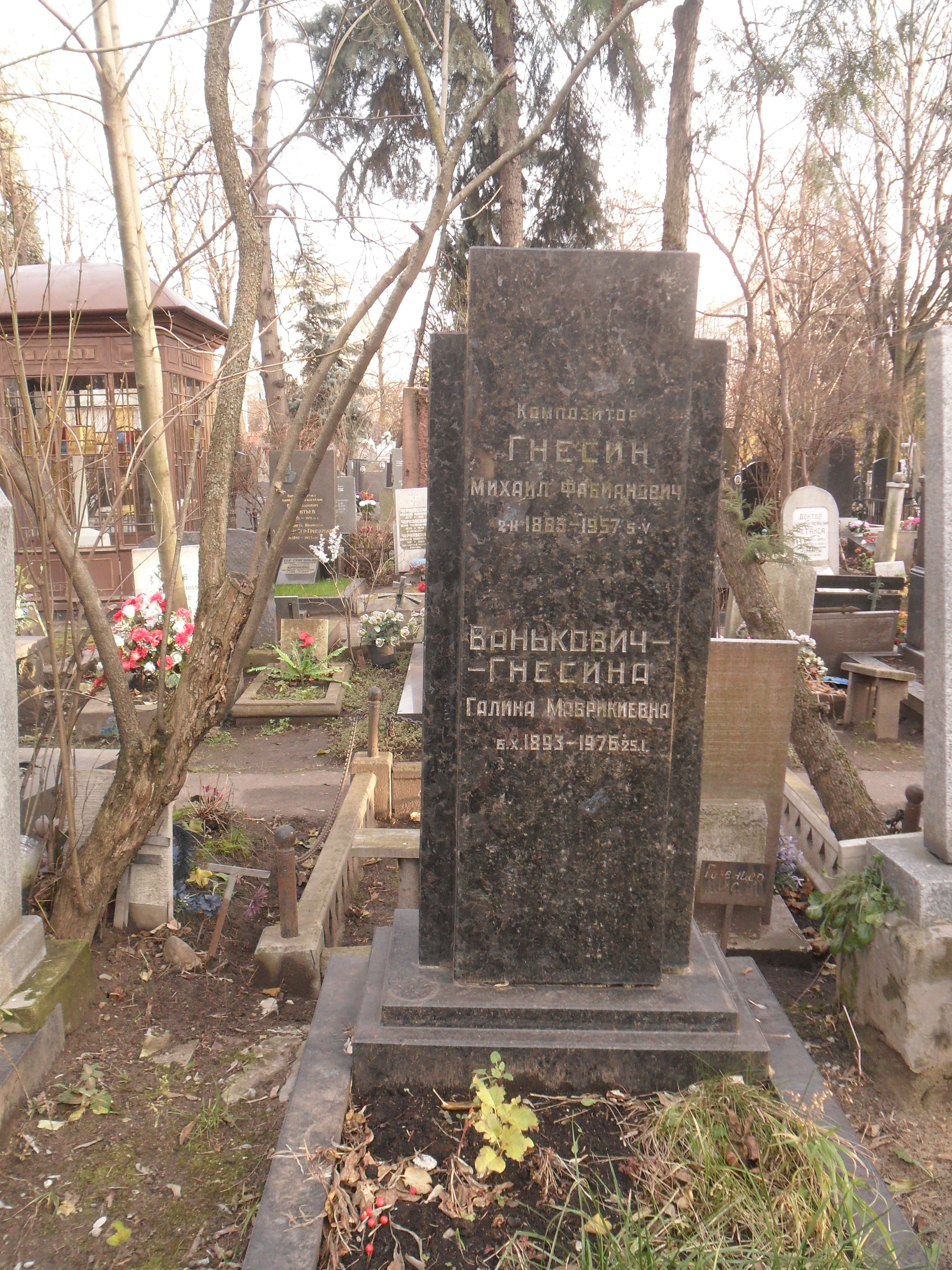
Gnessin's grave at Novodevichy Cemetery

Gnessin, like many artists of Jewish descent, faced increasing discrimination in the 1930s.

The position of Jews in the Soviet Union has always been a difficult one in that, unlike other ethnic minorities, Jewish culture has never received official backing, except in the 1920s...For example, the five volume History of Music of the Peoples of the USSR gives information on very small ethnic minorities, while the Jews, number around three million, are ignored. After the late 1930s, mention of Jewish music disappears from Soviet reference books altogether. It is significant that the 1932 edition of the Great Soviet Encyclopedia devoted eight-two pages to Jews; the 1952 edition has one page (devoted to Jews)! In the bibliography to that meager article is a classic anti-Semitic text from Germany.

Gnessin was forced to abandon both his "progressive tendencies" and his interest in music with "an overtly Jewish theme". His teaching career also suffered. While he would retain his position as titular head of the Gnessin Institute until his death, in the late 1940s, Gnessin's sister, Elena, was compelled by Communist Party stalwarts to dismiss him from his teaching duties.

Apart from the Conservatoire, other educational institutions incurred repressions; as a consequence of the anti-cosmopolitanism campaign, the Gnessin Music Institute received commands and notices from higher bodies to fire various members of staff, the most distinguished being the composer and teacher Mikhail Gnessin. Yelena Fabianovna Gnessina felt how differently her relations changed with the Committee of Arts. She discovered the intimidating reports and slanderous letters given against her and Mikhail Fabianovich. Sadly, there was no other course but to release her brother from his teaching duties so as to avoid a worse fate.

Gnessin's teaching career, and the discriminatory politics of his era, also meant that his compositions were less prolific after 1935.

Gnessin's students included Aram Khachaturian, Tikhon Khrennikov, and Valentina Ramm among his pupils.

He died in Moscow on 5 May 1957, and was buried at Novodevichy Cemetery.

== Works ==
=== Writings ===
- O prirode muzikal'novo iskusstva i o russkoy muzyke. Muzykal'nyy Sovremennik, 3 ( 1915):5.
- Cherkesskie pesni. Narodnoe tvorchestvo, 12 ( 1937).
- Muzykal'nyy fol'klor i rabota kompozitora. Muzyka, 20 ( 1937).
- Nachal'nyy kurs prakticheskoy kompozitsii. Moscow, 1941/ 1962.
- Maximilian Shteynberg. SovMuz, 12 ( 1946):29.
- O russkom epicheskom simfonizme. SovMuz, 6 ( 1948):44; 3 ( 1949):50; 1 (1950):78.
- Mysli i vospominaniya o N. A. Rimskom-Korsakove. Moscow, 1956.
- An Autobiography, in R. Glazer, M. P Gnessin (Moscow, 1961 (Russ.)), Hebrew trans. in Tatzlil, 2 (1961).

=== Compositions ===
- Op.1. Quartre pieces (Bal'mont, Zhukovsky, Galinoy) pour chant et piano
- Op.3. 2 Songs (Pushkin) for voice and piano
- Op.4. Prometheus Unbound. Symphonic Fragment after Shelley (1908)
- Op.5. Bal'mont songs for voice and piano
- Op.6. Ruth. Dramatic Song for voice and orchestra (1909)
- Balagan (Blok) for voice and piano/orchestra (some sources give as Op.6 ( 1909)
- Op.7. Sonata-Ballade for cello and piano (1909)
- Op.8. Vrubel' (Bryusov). Symphonic Dithyramb for orchestra and voice (1911)
- Op.9. Compositions for voice and piano
- Op.10. Dedications (Ivanov, Bal'mont and Sologub) for voice and piano (1912–1914)
- Iz pesen' moevo deda for violin and piano (1912)
- Op.11. Requiem for piano quintet (1912–1914)
- Op.12. The Conqueror Worm, after Poe for voice and orchestra (1913)
- Op.13. Antigone ( Sophocles, trans. Merezhkovskiy). Incidental music for musical declamatory reading of the monologues and choruses (1912–1913)
- A Nigun for Shike Fyfer for violin and piano (1914)
- Op.14. The Rose and the Cross (Blok). Incidental music (1914)
- Op.15. The Rose Garden (Ivanov) for voice and piano
- Op.16. Blok cycle for voice and piano
- Variations on a Jewish Theme for string quartet (1916)
- Op.17. The Phoenician Women (Euripides, trans. Annenskiy). Incidental music (1912–1916)
- Op.18. From Shelley (Shelley, trans. Bal'mont) for musical declamation and piano
- Net, ne budi zmeyu
- Song of Beatrice from the tragedy "The Cenci"
- Op.19. Oedipus Rex (Sophocles, trans. Merezhkovskiy). Incidental music for musical declamation of the choruses (1915)
- Op.20. Songs of Adonis (after Shelley) for orchestra (1917)
- Op.22. Sologub cycle for voice and piano
- Op.24. Variations on a Hebrew Theme for string quartet (1917)
- Funeral Dances for orchestra (1917)
- Op.26. Sapphic Strophes for voice and piano
- Op.28. Pesnya stranstvuyushchevo ritsarya for string quartet and harp (1917)
- Op.30. Songs of the Old Country. Symphonic Fantasy (1919)
- Op.32. Hebraic Songs for voice and piano
- Op.33. Hebraic Songs for voice and piano
- The Maccabeans. Opera (1921)
- Op.34. Pesnya stranstvuyeshchevo rytsarya for cello and piano (1921)
- Op.34. Hebrew folk song for cello and piano
- Op.36. Abraham's Youth. Opera (1923)
- Zvezdnye sny (stage work) (1923)
- Op.37. Hebrew Songs for voice and piano (1926)
- Op.38. Hebrew Song for voice and piano
- Op.39. Examples of Musical Reading (Declamation and piano)
- Op.40. 1905–1917 (Yesenin). Symphonic monument for voices, chorus, and orchestra (1925)
- Op.41. The Inspector-General (Gogol). Incidental music (1926)
- Evreiskiy orkestr na balu u Gorodnichevo for orchestra (some sources give Op.41) (1926)
- Op.42. Hebraic Songs for voice and piano
- Op.43. Sonata for violin and piano (1928)
- Op.44. The Story of Red-Headed Mottele (Utkin) for voice and piano (1926–1929)
- Op.45. Azerbaidzhan Folk songs for string quartet (1930)
- Op.48. Adygeya for violin, viola, cello, clarinet, horn, and piano (1933)
- Op.50. V Germanii (Svetlov) for chorus and orchestra (1937)
- Op.51. 2 Songs of Laura (Pushkin) for voice and piano
- Op.53. Songs of Adygeya for piano duet
- Op.55. Amangeldy (Djambul). Heroic Song (1940)
- Op.57. Elegiya-pastoral for piano trio (1940)
- Cantata to the Red Army (1942–1943)
- Op.59. Suita for violin and piano (1956)
- Op.60. Three Little Pieces for clarinet, violin, cello, and piano (1942)
- Op. 63 Piano Trio (1947)
- Op. 64 Piano Quartet (Sonata-Fantasia) for piano, violin, viola, and cello (1947)
