= Joseph Achron =

Composer and violinist based in the United States (1886–1943)

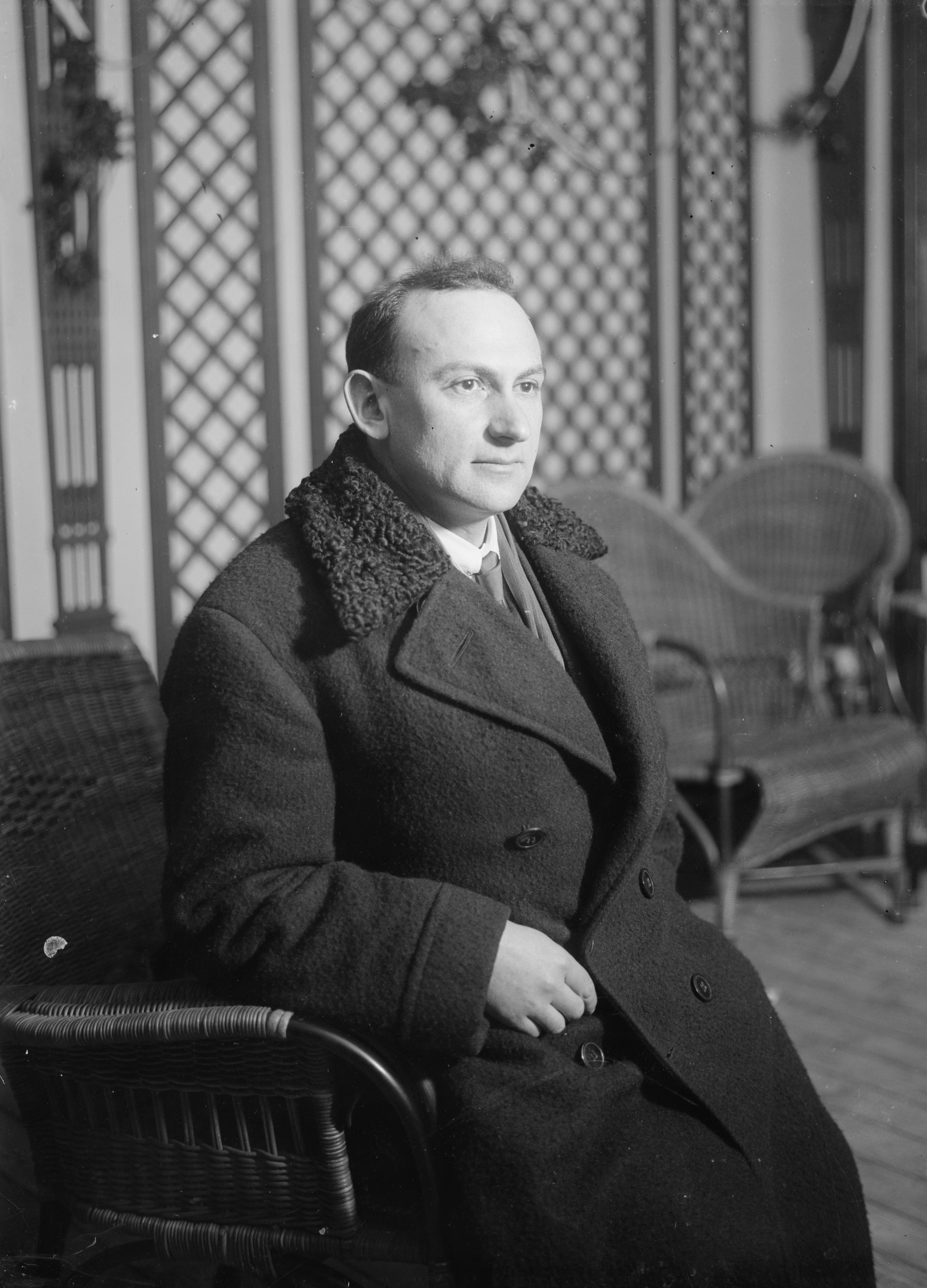

Background information
- Born: May 1, 1886; Lozdzieje, Suwałki Governorate, Congress Poland, Russian Empire
- Died: April 29, 1943 (aged 56) Hollywood, California, U.S.
- Genres: Jewish art music, classical music, film music
- Occupations: Violinist, composer
- Years active: 1908–1943

Joseph Yulyevich Achron, also seen as Akhron (Russian: Иосиф Юльевич Ахрон, Hebrew: יוסף אחרון) (May 1, 1886 – April 29, 1943) was a Russian composer and violinist, who settled in the United States. His preoccupation with Jewish elements and his desire to develop a "Jewish" harmonic and contrapuntal idiom, underscored and informed much of his work. His friend, the composer Arnold Schoenberg, described Achron in his obituary as "one of the most underrated modern composers".

== Biography ==
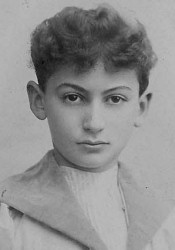
Achron as a youth

Achron was born in Lozdzieje, Russian Empire (now Lazdijai, Lithuania) to Julian and Bertha and began the study of the violin under his father, an amateur violinist, at the age of five. His first public performance followed three years later at age seven in Warsaw. This was followed by a prodigious childhood career including performances throughout Russia. Between 1899 and 1904 he studied violin under Leopold Auer and composition under Anatoly Lyadov, at the Saint Petersburg Conservatory.

He joined the Society for Jewish Folk Music in 1911 and from that point occupied himself in theory and practice with the Jewish music tradition. His first "Jewish" work, Hebrew Melody, became immediately recognized through the interpretation of violinist Jascha Heifetz. In 1913, Achron became the head of the violin and chamber music departments at the Kharkiv Conservatory in Ukraine, and served in the Russian Army between 1916 and 1918. In the years after World War I, he toured extensively as a concert artist in Europe, the Near East and Russia, performing over 1000 concerts between 1919 and 1922. During this period he was appointed head of the violin masterclass and chamber music department at the Leningrad Artists' Union. In 1922, Achron moved to Berlin, where together with Mikhail Gnessin he ran the Jewish music publishing company Jibneh. In 1924, Achron spent some months in Mandatory Palestine.

In 1925, he emigrated to the United States and settled in New York, where he taught the violin at the Westchester Conservatory. He performed his Violin Concerto No. 1 with the Boston Symphony Orchestra in 1927. His incidental music suite from H. Leivick's The Golem, also written during this period, was chosen by the International Society for Contemporary Music (ISCM) for performance in Venice in 1932.

In 1934, he moved to Hollywood, where he composed music for films and continued his career as a concert violinist. He performed his Violin Concerto No. 2 with the Los Angeles Philharmonic Orchestra in 1936 and his third – commissioned by Jascha Heifetz – with the same orchestra in 1939. Atonality and polytonality are among the techniques used in his later works. His final work was the Concerto for solo piano, Op. 74. He died in Hollywood in 1943 and is buried in Hollywood Forever Cemetery. A year after his death the Joseph Achron Memorial Committee was formed, which included twenty well-known composers, instrumentalists, conductors and critics.

He was the older brother of the concert pianist and composer Isidor Achron, who became Jascha Heifetz's accompanist for more than ten years.

== Selected works ==
=== Orchestral ===
- Hebrew Melody, Op. 33, for violin and orchestra (1911)
- Hazzan, Op. 34, for cello and orchestra (1912)
- 2 Hebrew Pieces, Op. 35 (1913)
- Dance Improvisation, Op. 37 (circa 1913)
- Epitaph to the Memory of Alexander Scriabin, Op. 38 (1915)
- Shir, Op. 42, dance for clarinet and orchestra (1917)
- 2 Pastels, Op. 44, for violin and orchestra (1917)
- The Fiddle's Soul, Op. 50 (1920)
- Violin Concerto No. 1, Op. 60 (1925)
- Konzertanten-Kapelle, Op. 64, for violin and orchestra (1928)
- Two Tableaux from Belshazzar (1931)
- The Golem, suite for chamber orchestra (1932)
- Dance Overture (1932)
- Little Dance Fantasy (1933)
- Violin Concerto No. 2, Op. 68 (1933)
- Violin Concerto No. 3, Op. 72 (1937)

=== Choral ===
- Epitaph (in memory of Scriabin), Op. 38, for four voices and orchestra (1915)
- Salome's Dance, Op. 61, for mixed voices, piano and percussion (1925) / (1966)
- Evening Service of the Sabbath, Op. 67, for baritone voice, four voices and organ (1932) - commissioned by Congregation Emanue-El of New York City, published by Bloch Publishing Company.

=== Chamber and instrumental ===
- Suite No. 1 en Style Ancien (Première Suite en Style Ancien), Op. 21, for violin and piano (circa 1914) / (1923)
- Chromatic String Quartet, Op. 26 (circa 1915)
- Sonata No. 1, Op. 29, for violin and piano (circa 1915)
- Stimmungen, Op.32, Two Pieces for violin and piano (circa 1915/16)
- Symphonic Variations and Sonata on a Jewish Theme, Op. 39, for piano (circa 1916)
- Suite Bizarre, Op. 41, for violin and piano (circa 1917)
- Sonata No. 2, Op. 45, for violin and piano (circa 1917)
- Children's Suite, Op.57, for clarinet, string quartet and piano (circa 1925)
- Elegy, Op. 62, for string quartet (1927)
- 4 Improvisations, Op. 63, for string quartet (1927)
- 2 Pieces, Op. 65, for viola and piano (1932)
- Statuettes, Op. 66, for solo piano (1930)
- The Golem, for cello, trumpet, horn and piano (1931)
- Sinfonietta, Op. 71, for string quartet (1935)
- Concerto for solo piano, Op. 74 (1941)

=== Miscellaneous ===
- Spring Night, ballet music for a short film (1935)

== See also ==
- The forgotten work of Joseph Achron in Hagai Shaham.
