= Alexander Krein =

Soviet composer (1883–1951)

- Александр Крейн
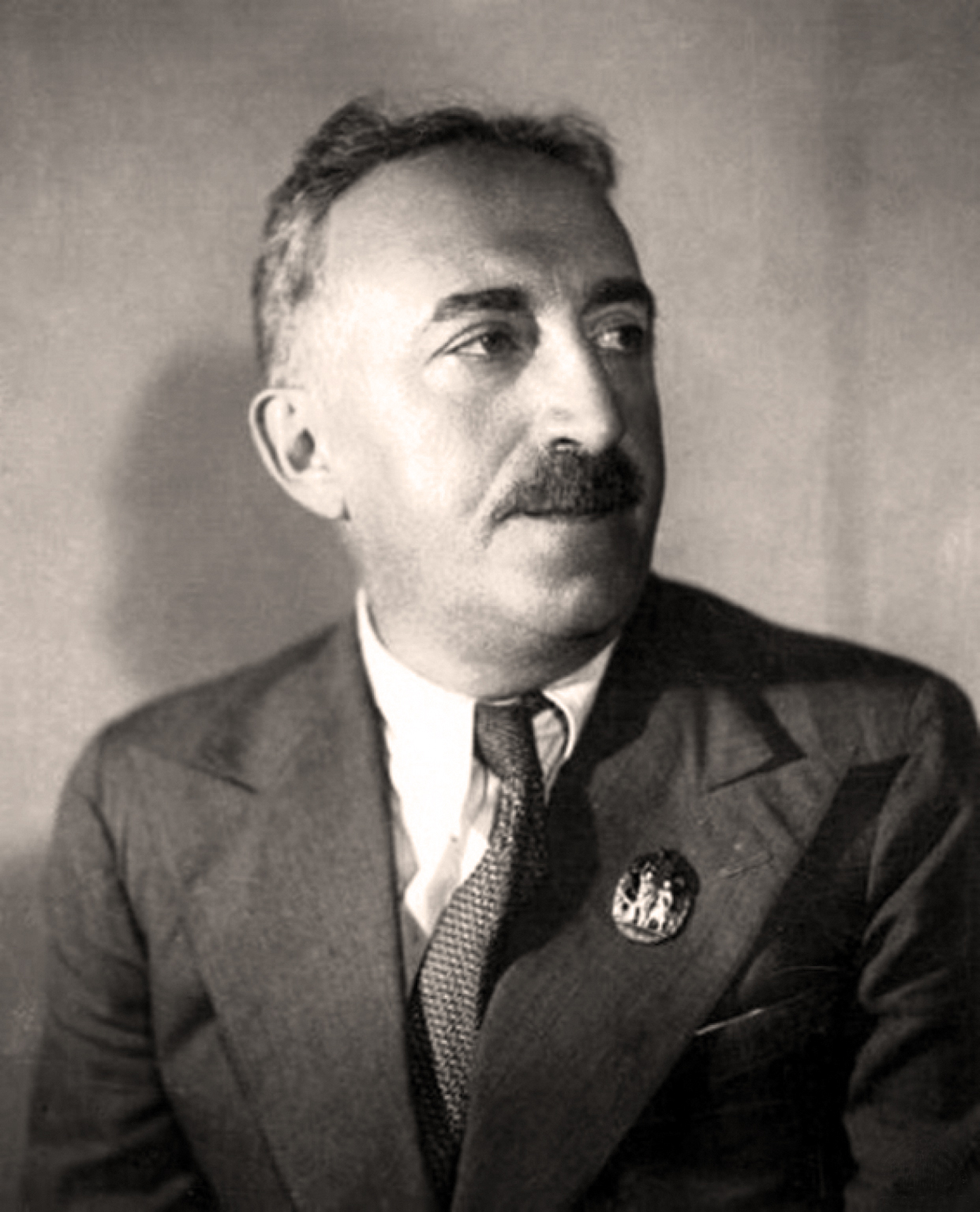
- Krein in 1940
- Born: 20 October 1883; Nizhny Novgorod, Russia
- Died: 25 April 1951 (aged 67); Staraya Ruza, Russian SFSR, Soviet Union
- Education: Moscow Conservatory
- Occupation: Composer

Alexander or Aleksandr Abramovich Krein (Russian: Александр Абрамович Крейн; 20 October 1883 – 25 April 1951) was a Russian and Soviet composer.

== Background ==
Krein was born in Nizhny Novgorod, Russia, on 20 October 1883. The Krein family was steeped in the klezmer tradition; his father Abram (who moved to Russia proper from Lithuania in 1870) was a noted violinist. All of the seven Krein brothers received their first musical training from him and became musicians; Alexander and Grigori made names for themselves as composers, David gained a strong reputation as a violinist. Of the three Krein family composers, Alexander, his brother Grigori, and Grigori's son Julian, it is Alexander who composed the most music and thus to whom the most attention has been paid. After decades of posthumous neglect, however, his very name seems to have disappeared from international reference books.

== Studies and career ==
In 1896, at the early age of 14, Alexander Krein entered the Moscow Conservatory where his studies included cello classes with Alexander von Glehn and composition lessons with Sergei Taneyev and Boleslav Yavorsky. His first works were published by P. Jurgenson in 1901. During the years immediately prior to the 1917 Revolution, he was on the faculty of the People's Conservatory in Moscow. In 1917, he was appointed as director of the artistic wing of the Muzo-Narkompros, the music section of a newly formed ministry of arts and education. Throughout the 1920s, Krein was widely regarded as the leader of a Jewish national school in Russia (which included his brother Grigori and his nephew Julian). Among those he influenced were minor composers such as Zinovy Feldman. After the formation of the Soviet Union, he held a variety of official and semi-official music administration posts. He died in April 1951, in the village of Staraya Ruza. His son, Alexander Kron, was a Soviet playwright.

== Style ==
Krein's pioneering spirit had led him to incorporate the intonations and styles of both sacred and secular Jewish music into a relatively advanced idiom that was as influenced by French impressionism as it was by the music of his friend Alexander Scriabin. Krein's own Jewish heritage was a constant source of inspiration; there are a number of instrumental works whose titles bear quite obvious witness to this, such as the Caprice Hebraique, Op. 24, and the Jewish Sketches for clarinet and string quartet. In 1921, he composed Kaddish for tenor soloist, choir, and orchestra. From the mid-1920s on, he also wrote music for plays given by Moscow's Jewish Drama Theater. There is also a large amount of music that is either purely classical in design or Soviet in nature. In the latter category are works like the revolutionary opera Zagmuk (1930), the Threnody in Memory of Lenin (1925), and the somewhat amusingly titled U.S.S.R., Shock Brigade of the World Proletariat (1925).

== Selected works ==
- Prologue for viola and piano, op. 2a (1902–1911/1927)
- Five Préludes for piano, op. 3 (1903–1906)
- Poème Quator for string quartet, op. 9 (1909)
- Jewish Sketches for clarinet and string quartet, op. 12 (1914, reprinted 2008 by Edition Silvertrust)
- Elegy for violin, cello and piano, op. 16 (1913)
- 3 Lieder des Ghetto (3 Songs from the Ghetto) for soprano and piano, op. 23

1. Sei mir Schwesterlein (1916)
2. Wo bist du? (1917)
3. Eine Träne (1915–1916)

- Caprice Hébraïque, op. 24 (1917)
- Kaddisch, Symphonic Cantata for tenor, mixed choir and large orchestra, op. 33 (1921–1922)
- Symphony No.1 for large orchestra, op. 35 (1922–1925)
- Piano Sonata (1925)
- 2 Hebräische Lieder (2 Hebrew Songs) for voice and piano, op. 39 (1926)
- Trauer-Ode to Lenin for Mixed Choir and large orchestra, op. 40 (1925–1926)
- Aria for violin and piano, op. 41 (1927)
- 2 Pieces on Turkish Themes, for solo piano Op.46 (1941)
- Ornamente (Орнаменти, Три песни без слов), 3 Songs without Words for voice and piano, op. 42 (1924/1927)
- Jewish Melody for cello and piano, op. 43 (1928)
- Zagmuk, opera (1929–1930)
- Laurencia, ballet (1939)
