= Jewish Ethnographic Expedition =

Project to document Jewish culture of the Pale of Settlement

The Jewish Ethnographic Expedition (1912–1914) was a project to document and preserve the traditional Jewish culture of the Pale of Settlement, the only region of the Russian Empire where Jews were legally allowed to live. Led by the writer and social activist S. An-sky, the expedition was motivated by concerns that the modernization of Eastern European Jewish life was rapidly erasing centuries-old customs, folklore, and religious practices. The Pale of Settlement, home to millions of Jews, was seen as a critical area for capturing authentic Jewish traditions that had been largely insulated from the influences of urbanization and assimilation.

The expedition, funded primarily through Jewish philanthropic efforts, sought to create a comprehensive ethnographic record. An-sky and his team, which included musicians, photographers, and students, traveled across Ukraine, visiting approximately 60–70 shtetls (small Jewish towns). They collected thousands of artifacts, including ritual objects, manuscripts, and photographs, and made over 500 recordings of Jewish folk music using a phonograph. The team also documented folk tales, legends, and songs, and recorded traditional healing practices and magical rituals performed by local women.

An-sky's ethnographic methodology combined scientific approaches such as the use of questionnaires and measurements with a deep personal connection to the communities he studied. His goal was not only to preserve these cultural elements but also to use them as a foundation for a future Jewish national revival. The expedition had a lasting impact on the study of Eastern European Jewish history, folklore, and identity, even though its materials were long thought lost. Much of the material collected during the expedition is now housed in various archives and museums, with some of it forming the basis for later research in Jewish ethnography.

== Background ==
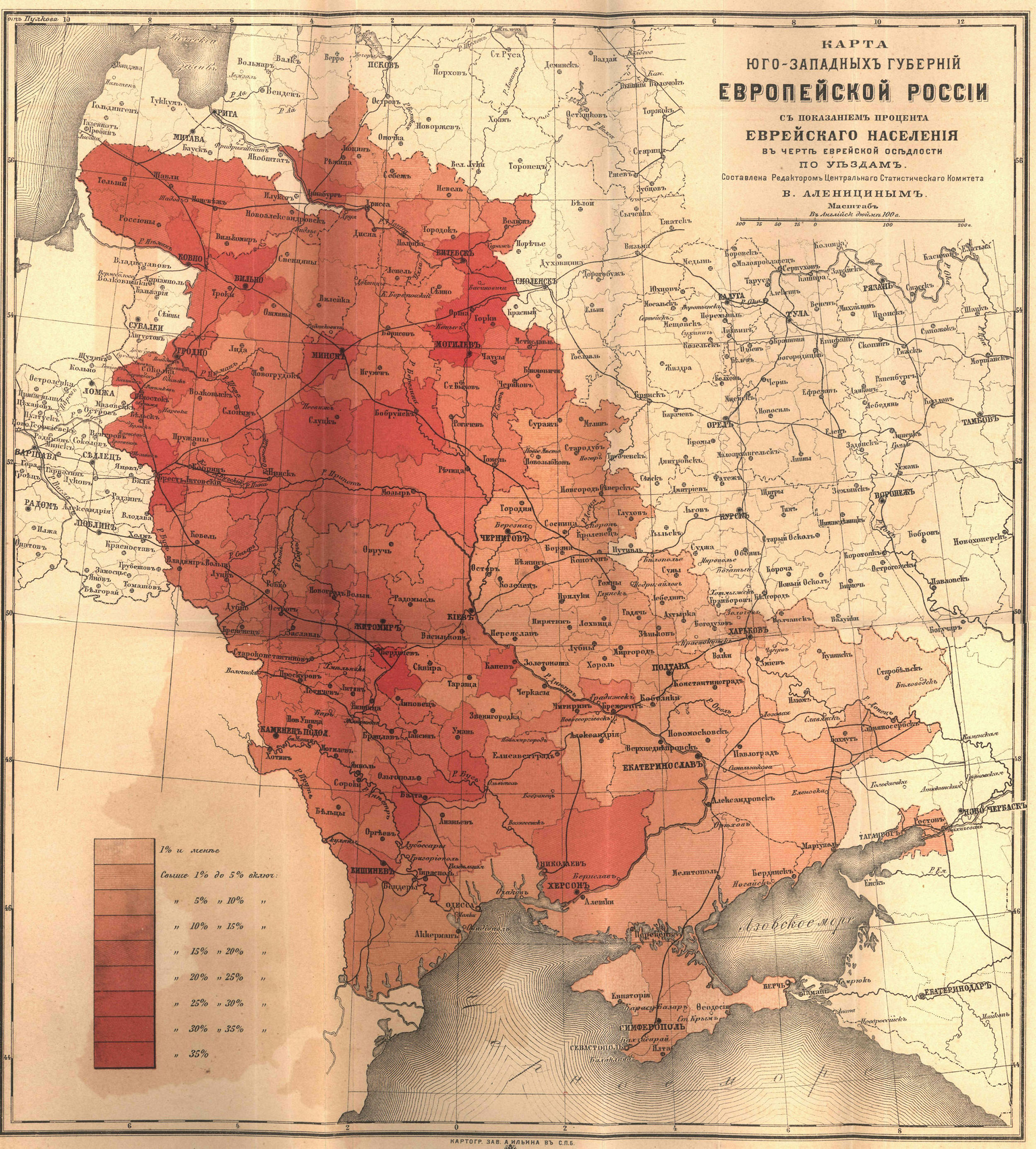
Pale of Settlement map, showing the percentage of the Jewish population in 1884

The Russian Empire had a large Jewish population in the so-called Pale of Settlement, a territory between the Baltic and Black seas. Jews could settle only there, in the territory of modern Belarus, Poland, Ukraine, Moldova, Lithuania, and Latvia, but not in Russian cities like Moscow or St. Petersburg. Around five million Jews lived in the Pale at the beginning of the 20th century; another two million emigrated to America before the October Revolution of 1917. Though Jews of the Pale of Settlement were subjects of the Russian Empire, they lacked full citizen rights.

S. An-sky was born Shloyme Zanvl Rappoport in 1863 and raised in the Pale, in the territory of modern Belarus; his native tongue was Yiddish. He had a cheder education, but left Vitebsk at 17, learned Russian, joined narodniki, and became known as a Russian author. He was, and considered himself, an assimilated Jew. He moved to the Donbas region in the spirit of the Going to the People movement, popular among narodniki, and changed his Jewish name to the more Russian-sounding "Semen An-sky". An-sky and other members of the Jewish intelligentsia did not consider the Jews of the Pale interesting; some did not consider them a people or a nation, and some thought that Yiddish was "a hybrid unnatural tongue" and Hebrew a dead language.

An-sky left the Russian Empire in 1892 for France and Switzerland, and returned only after the Revolution of 1905. He had done some ethnographic work earlier, mainly among Russian workers and peasants. Through the works of Jewish authors such as I. L. Peretz and Sholem Aleichem, he realized that Ashkenazi Jews of the Russian Empire were "a people and ... that they were his people", and in 1907 decided to "go to the Jewish people".

In 1891, historian Simon Dubnow, also an assimilated Jew born and raised in the Pale, compared the Pale of Settlement with the "dark continent" of Africa, and called for ethnographic studies of the region and its people. Dubnow founded the Jewish Historical-Ethnographic Society (JHES) in 1908 to promote such studies. For An-sky, the expedition was not only a scientific study; he believed that shtetl life was being eroded by modernization and thus vanishing, and that folk art gathered in the Pale could "provide the basis for a revived national culture". In 1909, JHES also launched a journal, Jewish Antiquity (Russian: Еврейская старина), which existed until 1930. Abraham Duker called the journal the "most important activity" of the society.

The Society for Jewish Folk Music was also founded in 1908 in St Petersburg. It promoted Jewish music via "research, composition, performance, and publishing". Joel Engel, who would later join An-sky in the expedition, was an active member of the society, as were Lazare Saminsky, Mikhail Gnesin, Joseph Achron, Solomon Rosowsky, Alexander Krein, and others. Multiple branches of the society were opened in the Russian Empire and abroad.

An-sky's expedition to the Pale was not the first ethnographical study of Eastern European Jews. Moisei Berlin published the first such study in the 1860s. In 1901, Peysakh Marek and Saul Ginsburg published Jewish Folk Songs in Russia that contained "hundreds of songs sent to them by Jewish zamlers" (collectors). Max Grunwald founded the first Jewish museum and the first Jewish folklore society in Hamburg in the 1890s. In 1890, Yiddish writer I. L. Peretz conducted an ethnographical study of the Jews from the Tomaszow region of Poland, commissioned by the banker Jan Bloch to "combat anti-Semitic charges of economic parasitism". (Note: For I.L. Peretz and Jewish folklore, see Kiel 1992.) Bloch also funded Andrei Subbotin's expedition, whose two-volume book In the Jewish Pale of Settlement was published in 1888–1890. (Note: See Субботин 1890)

== Expedition ==
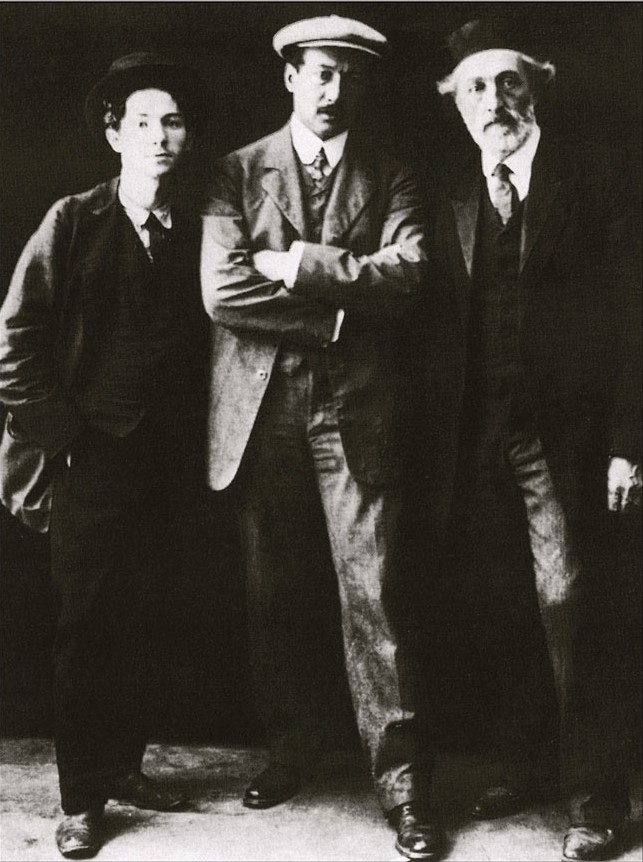
Participants of the first ethnographic expedition in 1912. From left to right: Solomon Yudovin, Joel Engel, and S. An-sky.

Before the expedition took place, An-sky convened a conference in Saint Petersburg on March 24–25, 1912, with prominent participants to discuss it. Among the attendees were historian Simon Dubnov, anthropologist Samuel Weissenberg, ethnographers Vladimir Jochelson and Lev Shternberg, historian Shaul Ginzburg, musicologist Joel Engel, attorney Mikhail Kulisher, lawyer Maksim Vinaver, and others. It was decided that a questionnaire should be created, which was to be sent to communities not visited by the expedition. Despite An-sky's idea to gather folklore, Shternberg argued that statistics and physiological measurements were more important. Engel insisted that a phonograph needed to be included in the expedition to record local songs and melodies.

Baron Vladimir Gintsburg, son of the Jewish philanthropist Naftali Hertz (Horace) Gintsburg, donated ten thousand rubles for the expedition to the Pale of Settlement. With this donation, An-sky gathered more than 20,000 rubles, and the expedition was officially called "The Jewish Ethnographic Expedition in Honor of Baron Naftali Hertz Gintsburg". (Note: The baron's last name, "Гинцбург", can be transliterated as Gunzburg, Gintsburg, Ginsburg, Guinsbourg, Gunzberg, Ginzberg, etc.)

An-sky was quite nervous before the expedition, and wrote about it in a letter to Vladimir Gintsburg, on June 30, 1912:

I am very nervous, as if standing before the great unknown. How will this all turn out? Will I be able to gain the trust of the poor and primitive people from whose ranks I myself have come but whom I left so far behind over these past years? ... And yet, at the same time, I have a great feeling of joy in my soul, that the most treasured dream of my life is beginning to come to fruition.

Between 1912 and 1913, An-sky's team traveled through the Podolia and Volhynia regions. In the first season, from July to October 1912, they visited 15 shtetls, and in the second season, June–November 1913, around 60. The team included artist and photographer Solomon Yudovin (An-sky's nephew), musicologists Joel Engel (for the first season) and Susman Kiselgof (for the second season), and ten students of the Higher Oriental Courses (or the Higher Courses in Eastern Studies), founded by Baron David Gintsburg. (Note: For the Higher Oriental Courses and its founder, baron David Gintsburg, see an article by the third president of Israel, Zalman Shazar, who attended the courses at the time of the expedition: Shazar 1967.) Three students, Abraham Rechtman, Yitskhok Fikangur, and Shmuel Schreier, took part in the second season of the expedition. Others were Sh. Vaynshtayn, Avrom Yuditsky, Sh. Lakshin, Isaac Lurie, Y. Neusikhin, Y. Kimelman, and Yekhiel Ravrebe. (Note: For a short biography of Ravrebe, see Greenbaum & Beizer 1992.) Five students were from Hasidic shtetls, and three (Rechtman, Ravrebe, and Shrayer) received rabbinic ordination. Levi Yitzhak Vaynshteyn was the secretary of the expedition. According to Rechtman, the poet Hayim Nahman Bialik joined the expedition for several weeks, though no one else ever mentioned it.

Two musicologists took part in the expedition, both of whom were members of the Society for Jewish Folk Music. Zusman Kiselgof was born into a family of a melamed in Velizh, a shtetl in Vitebsk region. He became a teacher, and a collector of Jewish music. He started in 1902, and went to his first field expedition in 1907 to Lubavitch, in the Mogilew region. (Note: For a short biography of Kiselgof and his contribution to Jewish folk music studies, see Sholokhova 2004.) Joel Engel was born in a Russian-speaking family outside the Pale, and studied music in the Moscow Conservatory. He was also a collector of Jewish songs, starting from 1898, and was a noted music critic. Before An-sky's expedition, Engel was an advisor to Saul Ginsburg and Pesach Marek, who published a "groundbreaking" book on Jewish tunes, Jewish Folksongs in Russia, in 1901.

The expedition began on July 1, 1912, when An-sky, Yudovin, and Engel departed on a train from Kiev to a station near Ruzhin. An-sky planned to visit "three hundred of the most important Jewish communities throughout the Pale", but because of multiple problems and the outbreak of the war, the expedition was able to visit around 60 or 70 shtetls. An-sky outlined a plan of the expedition in a 1913 memorandum: he planned to stay in each shtetl for 3 or 4 days and contact "the local intelligentsia" in advance. The shtetl's synagogue was always the first destination in a new place. Among those visited were: Podolia province (Bogopol, Letichev, Medzhibozh, Proskurov), Kiev province (Tetiev, Berdichev, Pavoloch, Ruzhin, Skvira, Talne), Volyn province (Olyka, Kovel, Trisk, Zaslav, Kremenets, Polonne, Dubno, Rivno, Korets, Derazhnja, Lutsk, Sudilkov, Muravitsa, Shepetovka, Slavuta, Annopol, Klevan, Ludmir). The expedition visited the shtetls in Ukraine because they believed them to be more traditional and "less changed by modern forces".

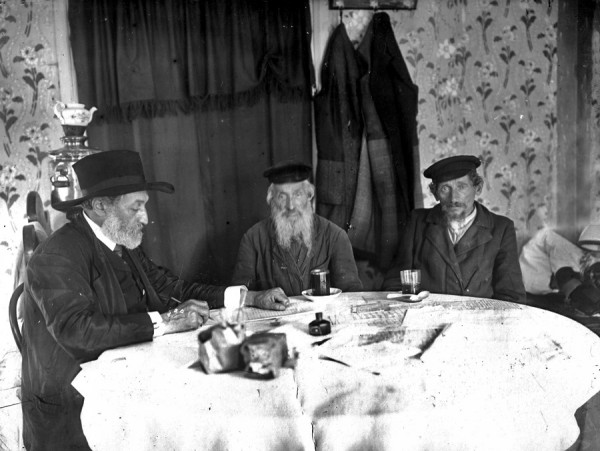
An-sky interviews locals during the expedition

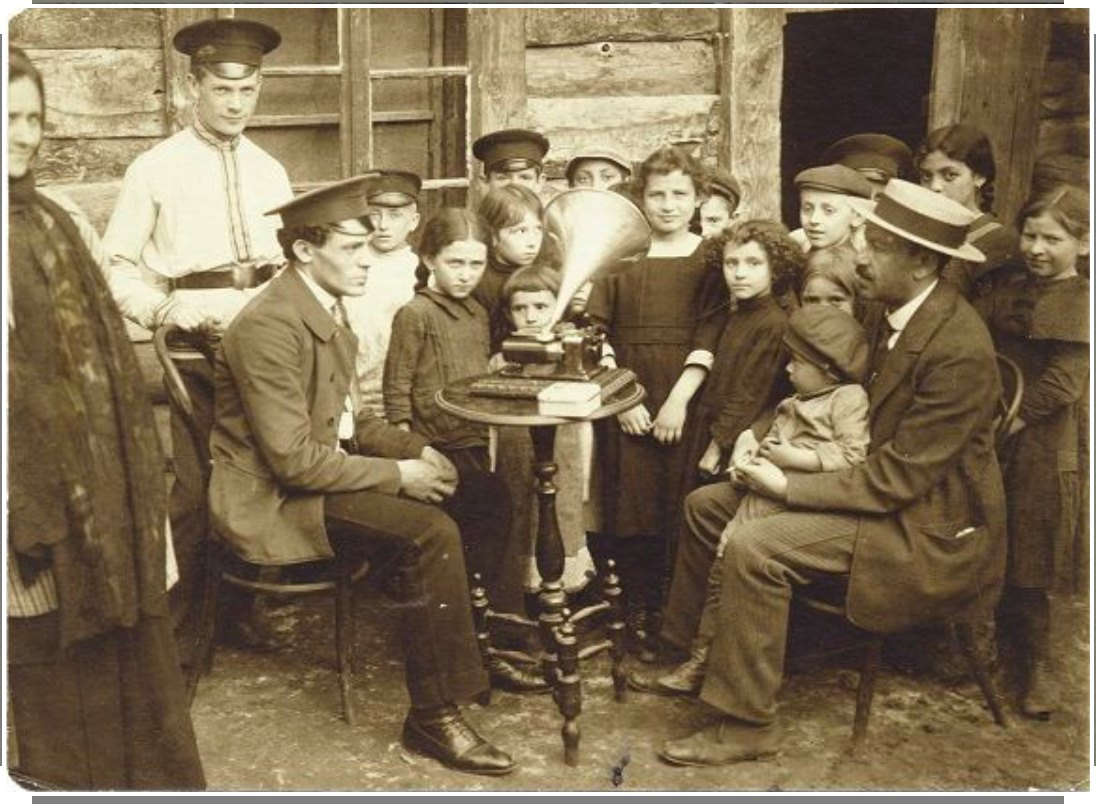
Susman Kiselgof (on the right, seated with a child) with a phonograph in a shtetl during the expedition

An-sky's team tried to pay for the stories and songs in some shtetls, and sometimes local children invented such songs to get money. Gathering women's traditional songs was usually difficult, because it wasn't customary for Jewish women to sing in the presence of men, as it was considered immodest. In some shtetls women completely refused to sing, in some they refused to be recorded. When the expedition reached a shtetl, they showed the phonograph to locals, usually singing something with an intentional cough or laugh and then playing it back to the people; usually everyone, even the rabbis, were very impressed. After that many people wanted to be recorded; some called Thomas Edison, the phonograph's inventor "bal-moyekh [a man with brains], or ayzerner kop [a great head], a Yiddish metaphor for an exceptionally smart person." In some shtetls though people completely refused to be recorded. (Note: For the history of early recordings of Jewish sacred music, and people's opinion on gramophone, see Loeffler 2020.) All members of the expedition were assimilated Jews. An-sky insisted that they needed to "act Jewish": everyone was required to observe Shabbat while in shtetls; this meant, for example, no smoking, because it is forbidden to light fire on Shabbat. They spoke only Yiddish in shtetls, even though Engel had only a rudimentary knowledge of it. Sometimes locals thought that they were actors, or even that An-sky was a cantor accompanied by his choirmaster.

An-sky concealed his fame as a Socialist revolutionary and writer, and was called by his Jewish name in shtetls, or simply "Reb Shlomo". He had a beard, wore a black coat and a hat, and was sometimes welcomed "with the kind of respect they [Hasidim] typically accorded to a holy man", and sometimes even treated as a zaddik, "because his public persona during the expedition tapped into pre-existing models of Hasidic holiness": An-sky had almost no belongings besides his valises with books and papers. According to Shrayer, An-sky forgot everything from his Jewish childhood, and remembered only one prayer, Psalm 104 Borchi nafshi [‘Bless the Lord, my soul’], that he used instead of all other prayers when he visited synagogues. However, Engel's writings don't support this account. An-sky was a Kohen, and locals often had their own understanding of what was an appropriate behaviour for him; a Kohen, for example, can't enter a cemetery.

An-sky was eager to gather as much material as possible, often employing what Deutsch calls "ethnographic performances". Rechtman described their approach later in his memoirs:

Almost every shtetl in Ukraine had its old women whom people went to for advice in times of crisis. ... These women performed magic with knives, socks and combs; they poured wax and poached eggs and knew hundreds of ways to cure a patient. ... We employed strategies to get these old women to tell us their charms. Sometimes one of us would pretend to be ill, take to bed and call for the healer. ... Another member of the expedition generally sat in a corner, trying to write down everything he heard while the photographer took pictures. Often An-sky would go to one of these old healers and complain that he was suffering continual bad luck; he told them that he had once been a rich man, a merchant, and now—alas—he was poor, fallen on hard times, without an income. And having explained why he had come to ask her for help he would ask her to give him some magic spells to help him find a way to earn a living. An-sky was always careful to mention that he was not looking for charity but ready to pay for her services. His broken voice and his straightforward story nearly always produced the desired result. The old woman would get caught up in the story and start to pity her client, hoping later to be able to ask for more money. Having haggled over the price, the old woman would reveal her secret spell and An-sky would write it down.

An-sky considered Jewish folk traditions he wanted to gather to be an "Oral Torah" (Toyre shebalpe). He was especially interested in Hasidim and in their oral tales; in the instructions to the questionnaire he explicitly stated that the fieldworker needed to ask whether the story is oral: if the respondent read it somewhere, there was no need to record it. Hasidim were also interested in gathering their own folk songs, tales, and religious artifacts, but were surprised to see a group of assimilated Jews from St. Petersburg interested in them. Shrayer invented a story that was approved by locals, but was mostly fake (An-sky was poor, though he indeed was childless):

Reb Shlomo Rapoport was one of the wealthy residents of Petersburg and since he was childless, he had taken a vow to collect the remnants of the antiquities of the Jewish people, in order to show the nations and their neighbors the beauty of the ‘Congregation of Israel.’ This story found favor with them, and we not only gained the trust of the Hasidim but also of the rabbis.

Overall, the expedition of 1912 was conducted from July 1 to October 15, and of 1913 from June to September 20. The expeditions were officially ended after Yudovin and Rechtman were arrested as spies in Zhitomir at the end of 1914; An-sky, who had already left for St. Petersburg, was able to obtain for them documents stating that they worked for the Imperial Anthropological and Ethnographical Museum, and both men were swiftly released with all collected materials.

== Ethnography and relief work during the war ==
I recalled the shard of the Ten Commandments that I had found at the profaned and shattered synagogue in Dembits. All that was left on the fragment were the words kill and commit adultery.

— S. An-sky, Khurbn Galitsiye

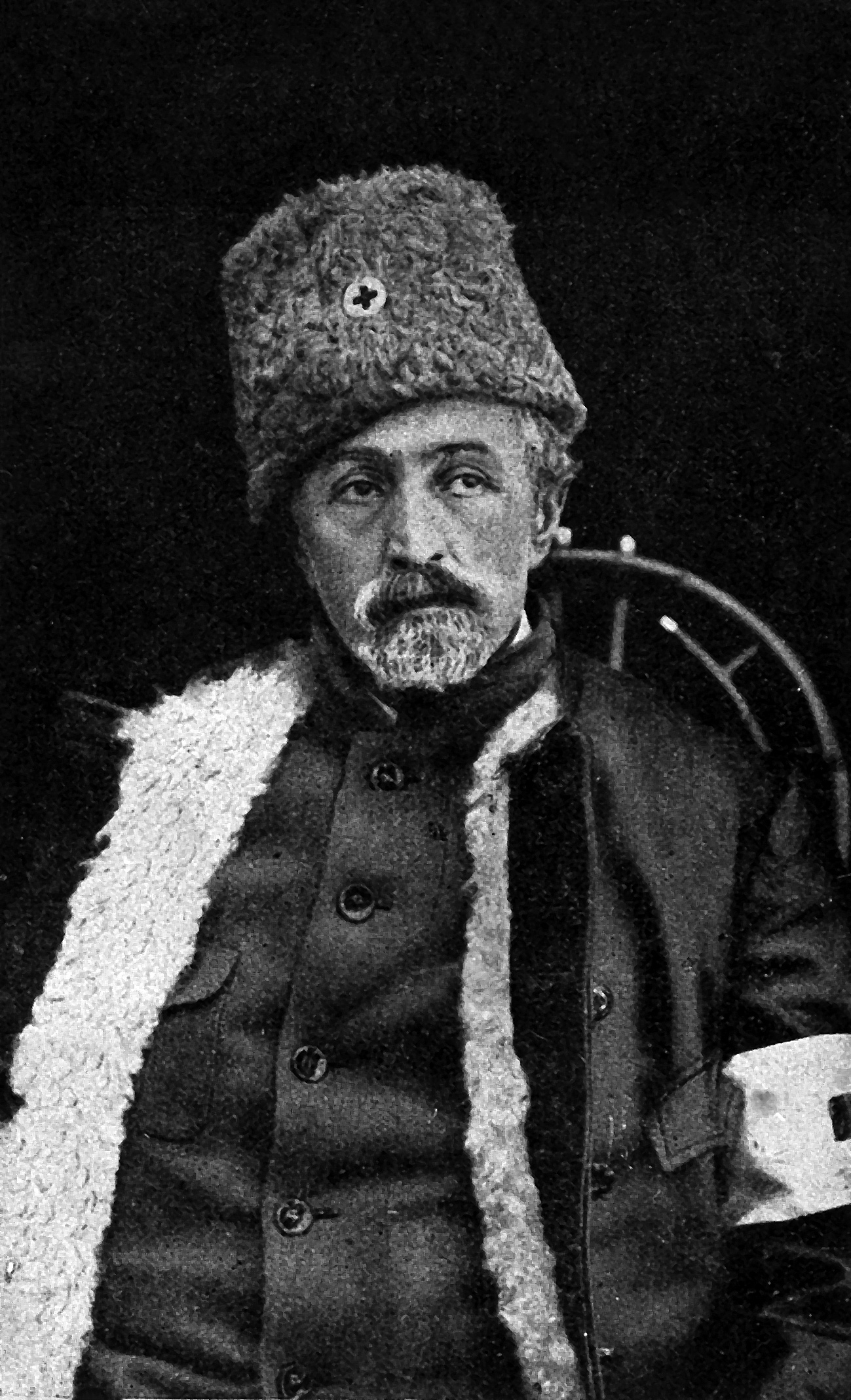
An-sky in 1914, a volunteer of the Jewish Committee for the Relief of War Victims

In 1914, the Russian Empire entered World War I as part of the Allied Powers. The Jewish population of the Russian Empire was hit exceptionally hard, facing persecution from both enemy forces and their own military. As the war began in 1914, nearly one million Jews lived in Galicia alone (approximately twelve percent of its population), a region of Austria-Hungary occupied by the Russian Empire. Jewish civilians of the region suffered from enemy bombardment while simultaneously facing systematic persecution from Russian military forces, who viewed them as potential German sympathizers. Everything could be seen as a sign of espionage, for example "having a telephone" or "possessing information which could be the result of espionage". The Russian military's anti-Jewish campaign included forced deportations, surveillance, and pogroms by passing forces. The army's suspicion of Jews as "unreliable elements" led to widespread deportations, with estimates suggesting around 3.3 million displaced (mostly Jews, Poles, and Germans) in several provinces of the empire in 1915 alone. The Jews were seen as an "alien" population, and Yiddish was often confused with German. In August 1915, mounting humanitarian concerns and international pressure led the Tsar's Council of Ministers to provisionally expand the borders of the Pale of Settlement, though Jews still had no rights to settle in Moscow and St. Petersburg. This created what contemporaries called a "new Pale", where displaced Jews faced overcrowding, poverty, and continued discrimination in their new settlements, where they were considered "outsiders ... branded as traitors and spies".

Russian and Galician Jews were suspicious of each other; Galician Jews "often distrusted and despised Russian Jews" while Russian Jews often thought of Galicians as "poor, backward, and uncultured, referring to them as 'reactionary masses'". With the outbreak of the war, An-sky went to the shtetls of Galicia with a relief mission as a representative of the Jewish Committee for the Relief of War Victims. He also visited shtetls in Podolya and Volyn, which were previously studied during the expedition. He distributed medical aid, documented the persecutions, and continued to collect stories and salvage artifacts, sending them to the museum in St. Petersburg. The Jewish Historical Ethnographical Society also took part in salvaging Jewish artifacts: in 1916, Ben-Tsion Rubshtein with his team visited 25 shtetls and collected "more than 1,000 sacred objects, including nearly 500 Torah scrolls."

In 1915, An-sky, together with writers I.L. Peretz and Yankev Dinezon, published an appeal to people in two Yiddish newspapers, Haynt and Moment, to record their wartime experience and send it to the Jewish Historical Ethnographic Society:

Become historians yourselves! Don't depend on the hands of strangers! Record, take it down, and collect! ... Record everything, knowing thereby that you are collecting useful and necessary material for the reconstruction of Jewish history. ... otherwise our account will be empty, and neither people nor history will owe us anything ... others — total strangers — will write for us and in our names. And among those strangers we have so few friends.

An-sky compiled his 1915 wartime diary into a book in Yiddish; (Note: Zavadivker 2013, pp. 90–93, 108–112 shows that An-sky chose Yiddish because he "wanted to present it as a significant event in Jewish history", while simultaneously "construct, or fashion his own Jewish identity ... as a prophetic and fatherly figure".) historian Amos Morris-Reich described it as "a catalogue of the unprecedented forms of barbarism inflicted on Jews". The four-volume book was titled Khurbn Galitsiye (Yiddish: חורבן גאליציע, The Destruction of Galicia). An-sky used the word "khurbn", which is used in Yiddish and Hebrew in a phrase for the destruction of the temple, and means "a cataclysmic, utter destruction". (Note: For English translation, see An-sky 2003, by Joachim Neugroschel, and An-sky 2016 by Polly Zavadivker. For the history of the book, see Zavadivker 2013.) (Note: After World War II, the word khurbn is often used as a synonym to the Holocaust: see Khurbn and Names of the Holocaust.) The diary he wrote during the war was mostly lost together with his archive, probably during the revolution and An-sky's subsequent departure from Moscow to Vilnius. Khurbn Galitsiye was published posthumously in 1921. An-sky was not the only activist who documented the wartime condition of the Jews. Ethnographer Lev Shternberg, who previously worked with An-sky and also became a representative of the Jewish Committee, traveled to Lithuania, where he witnessed and documented the expulsion of the whole population of the shtetl Onikshty. He published an article in Russian, "Among the Expellees", (Note: L. Ia. Shternberg, "Sredi vyselentsev," Evreiskaia nedelia no. 12 (9 August 1915), 18–21; no. 17 (13 September 1915), 21–29; no. 20 (4 October 1915), 16–20; no. 21 (11 October 1915), 12–17; no. 22 (18 October 1915), 17–20; no. 24 (1 November 1915), 19–23; no. 26 (15 November 1915), 25–28. cited in Zavadivker 2013, p. 84.) about the refugees' journey after the expulsion.

== After the war ==
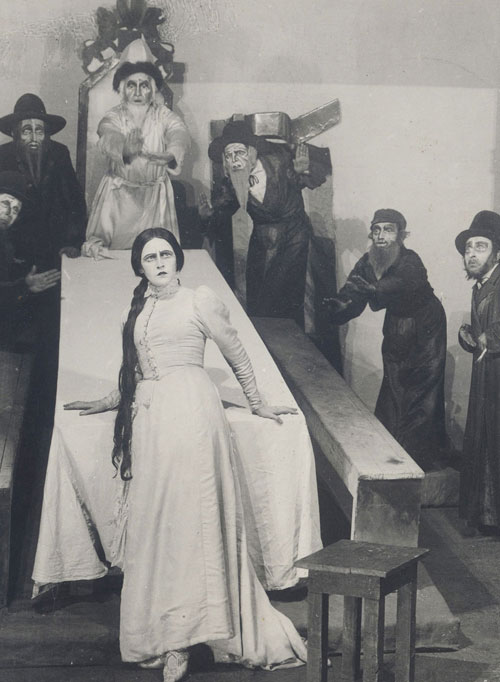
Hanna Rovina as Leah in the Hebrew-language premiere of The Dybbuk. Habima Theater, Moscow, 31 January 1922.

In 1918, An-sky published The Dybbuk, a play that became a classic of Yiddish theater, sometimes called an "ethnographical play". An-sky was inspired by the stories he heard during the expedition. It was first staged in 1920 in Vilnius by the Vilna Troupe, on shloshim, 30 days after An-sky's death, and later became the most performed Jewish play. Musicologist Albert Weisser even called The Dybbuk "the Jewish peoples' principal contribution to the world of dramaturgy". David Roskies called it the "most perfect distillation of Jewish folklore and mysticism", and wrote that the "romantic plot, the mystical setting and the historical landscape in An-sky's play were all born en route from one godforsaken shtetl to another." The poet Hayim Nahman Bialik, whom An-sky asked to translate the play into Hebrew, harshly criticised it, writing to An-sky that he "combed through the garbage dumps ... picked out your little fragments of folklore and pieced together the remnants of all sorts of clothing into patches and took those patches and sewed them together into a sort of crazy quilt." Bialik, nevertheless, translated the play; it is mainly known in Bialik's Hebrew translation. Though stories about dybbuks were staged before, it was An-sky's play that popularised the dybbuk and the gilgul (Kabbalistic reincarnation), and made them a part of "a folk motif". The Dybbuk contains many ethnographic elements, such as a ritual of kissing the Torah scrolls, the blowing of the shofar, Jewish wedding, the exorcism of the dybbuk, and Jewish prayers. Joel Engel wrote a score for the 1922 Hebrew premiere by the Habima theater, directed by Yevgeny Vakhtangov. A contemporary reviewer wrote that Engel's music for the play "resound like old synagogue biblical psalms". (Note: For a short biography of Engel and the analysis of his score for The Dybbuk, see Weisser 1954, pp. 71–81.) The Jewish-American composer Aaron Copland attended Habima's performance in New York in c. 1925–1927, and was inspired by Engel's music for his piano trio "Vitebsk: A Study on a Jewish Theme". Both Engel's and Copland's pieces are based on a nigun that Engel recorded during the expedition, later titled Mipnei ma.

Artists El Lissitzky and Issachar Ber Ryback traveled through shtetls in the Pale (now in Belarus) in 1916. Their expedition was probably funded by the Jewish Ethnographic Society. They visited towns and cities around the Dnieper river, including Orsha, Dubrovna, Shklow, Mogilev (and its Cold Synagogue), and Druya. (Note: For Lissitzky's article about the Mogilev synagogue, see Lissitzky 2019)

Of An-sky's expedition members, Yitzhak Fikangur (Gur-Aryeh) moved to Israel and published a translation of 400 questions in Hebrew. Abraham Rechtman escaped from Russia to China in 1915, and moved from China to the United States via Japan in 1916. His collection of photographs and records was destroyed in his hometown, Proskurov, during the pogrom by Symon Petliura's soldiers in 1919, in which thousands of Jews were murdered. Rechtman published several articles about the expedition under the pen name Dr. Zamler ("Dr. Collector" [of folklore]), and a book in Yiddish about the expedition in 1958, Yidishe etnografye un folklore: zikhroynes vegn der etnografisher ekspeditsye ongefirt fun Sh. An-ski, in Buenos Aires. The book received little attention and was not republished. It was digitised in 2009; an English translation by Nathaniel Deutsch and Noah Barrera was published in 2021. The book was called "a suture across the aura of myth and fantasy in which the fabled An-sky ethnographic expeditions have been suspended". (Note: For English translation and the biography of Abraham Rechtman, see Rechtman 2021)

Avrom Yuditsky, a student of the Higher Oriental Courses who assisted An-sky with a smaller questionnaire, worked for Bundist newspapers and gathered information on pogroms in Korsun, Smel, and Cherkassy during WWI. He worked in the Institute of Jewish Proletarian Culture in Kiev, from c. 1919 to 1933. Before World War II, he published multiple books and articles on Jewish history; in 1940 he co-authored Jewish Folk Songs in Yiddish. (Note: See Yidishe folḳs-lider (in Yiddish). Melukhe-farlag der emes̀. 1940.) During the war, he was evacuated to Tashkent, and worked for Solomon Mikhoels's Jewish theater. He died there in 1943.

After the revolution of 1917, Yekhiel Ravrebe, who got a rabbinic ordination and published poetry in Yiddish and Hebrew before moving to St. Petersburg to attend Higher Oriental Courses, taught at the Jewish University in Petrograd in 1919; he later moved to Minsk to read "Semitics" and "Hebrew" at the Belarusian State University. In 1930, he moved back to Leningrad, when the courses were closed by the authorities, and soon became a librarian at the Hebrew section of the State Public Library. He was arrested by the NKVD on October 25/26, 1937, accused of being "a member of a fascist, Zionist, and anti-Soviet group which tried to undermine Soviet nationality policy", sentenced to eight years of labor camps, and died in a transit camp on February 7, 1939.

Isaac Lurie, one of the students who assisted An-sky and the archivist of the Jewish Historical-Ethnographic Society, went to Ottoman Palestine in 1913 to collect music of "oriental" Jewish communities in Jerusalem. Among the Jews he recorded were people from Syria (Aleppo and Urfa), Iraq (Baghdad), Iran (Shiraz), Yemen, Morocco, and possibly even Ethiopia. Recordings were created between July 10 and August 1. (Note: In 1911–1913, musicologist Abraham Zvi Idelsohn also recorded Jewish songs in Jerusalem. It is not known whether Lurie and Idelsohn knew about each other's work.) The collection of 67 wax cylinders is now in the Vernadsky Library in Kyiv. Together with An-sky, Lurie organized the Jewish museum in St Petersburg, which opened in 1917. In 1921, he led an ethnographic expedition to Turkestan to study Bukharan Jews, and in 1924 he became a director of a Jewish museum in Samarkand. The museum was closed in 1931; Lurie probably died in or after 1932, a victim of the Soviet repressions.

== Collection ==
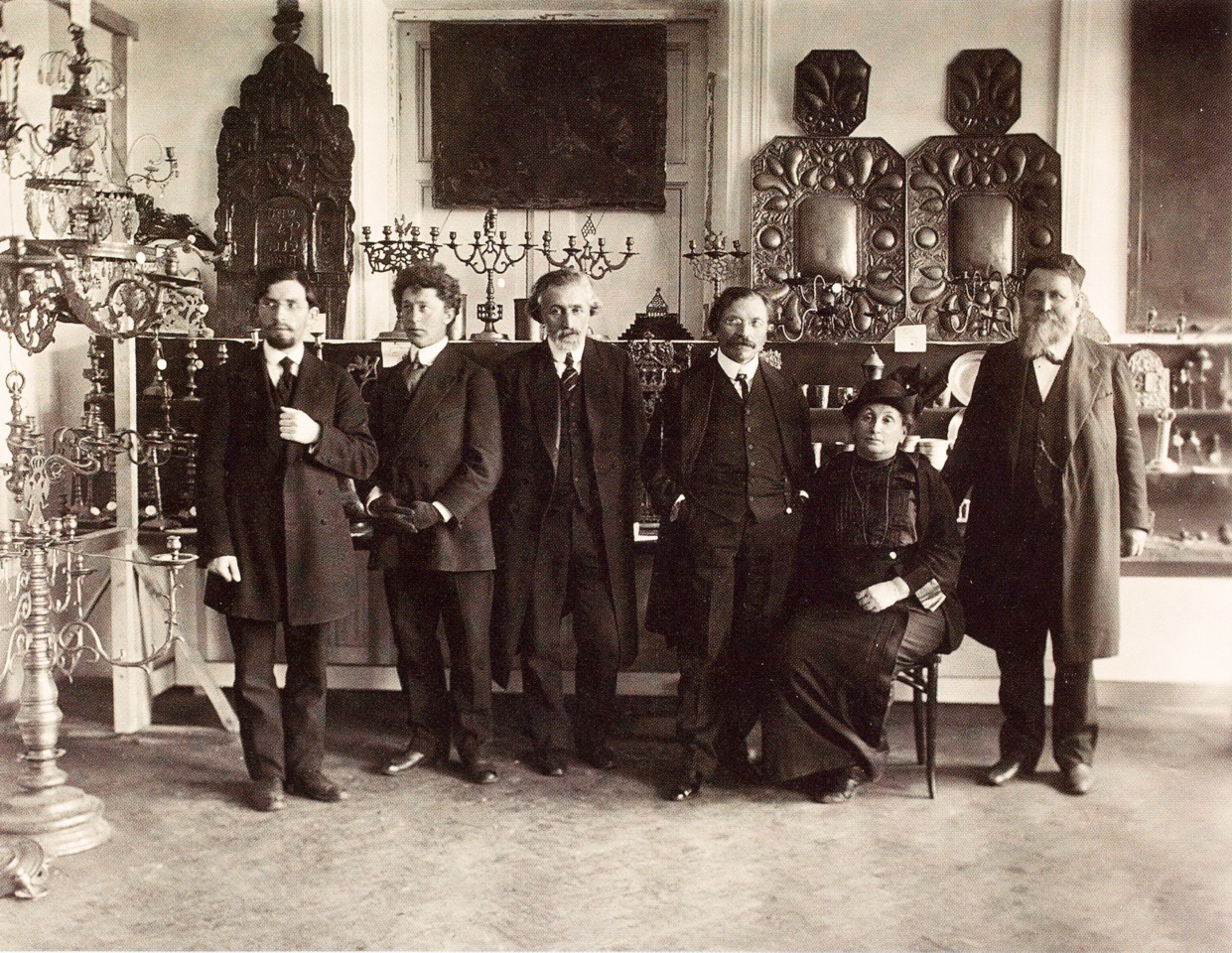
Members of S. An-sky's ethnographic expedition in the Jewish Museum in St Petersburg (from left to right) Abraham Rechtman, Solomon Yudovin, S. An-sky, with Sholem Aleichem, his wife Olga Rabinovitch, and Moisei Ginsburg, 1914

An-sky was interested in all kinds of artifacts. Shrayer and Avrom Rekhtman recalled gathering kvitlekh, notes that Hasidim brought to the zaddiks' graves, which were usually burned. Shrayer wrote about this as "[we] robbed the graves of the zaddikim". Other unusual artifacts that were gathered include "the broken skull from Chmielnitsky's time that An-sky dug up himself or the petrified finger that An-sky purchased from an old man in Proskurov, who had amputated it in order to avoid conscription into the tsar's army (normally, severed limbs would be saved and buried alongside the individual so that the entire body would be intact for the Resurrection of the Dead)". Additionally, they took around 2,000 photographs, collected 700 "ritual and everyday objects (at a cost of 6,000 rubles)", 500 manuscripts, including pinkasim, recorded 1,800 folk tales, legends, folk songs and melodies. Joel Engel visited only four shtetls and made 44 phonograph records, before he cut the journey short in July 1912 because of family matters. In the next season, Susman Kiselgof became responsible for the recordings. In total, they made more than 500 recordings of music.

In 1914, a small exhibition was held in the Museum of the Jewish Historical and Ethnographical Society; in 1917, it was closed and its collection transferred to the Ethnographical Department of St. Petersburg's Russian Museum. In June 1923, the Jewish Museum was reopened; Solomon Yudovin became its first curator. It was closed in 1929, after the government claimed it was religious propaganda. A large part of the collection was moved to the Mendele Moykher-Sforim Museum of Jewish Culture in Odesa, which remained open until 1941. The Leningrad State Museum of Ethnography also held a large collection, comprising parts of the collection from Odesa and materials received from Yudovin. The museum was damaged during World War II. Now, the Vernadsky Library in Kiev and the Russian Museum of Ethnography in Saint Petersburg hold the majority of materials.

The collection was exhibited in 1939. It was almost forgotten and even thought to be lost, and was rediscovered after the collapse of the Soviet Union.

In the 30s, "five suitcases and boxes" with An-sky's collection where preserved at the Institute for Jewish Proletarian Culture in Kiev. In 1936, the institute was closed, its director executed. Its collection was partially destroyed and partially moved out by the NKVD. The remains of the collection were transferred to the Vernadsky Library. During World War II, the library was looted by the Nazis. After the war, around 1949, "almost all of the Judaica collection was taken out of the library and hidden in the dank catacombs of the medieval Vydubetsk monastery, where it remained until 1968". It was then moved "into a private basement", rediscovered in the 1990s, and transferred back to the Vernadsky.

In 2026, YIVO and the Vernadsky Library signed an agreement to preserve and digitize An-sky's collection. According to a 2026 article, the collection is preserved in poor conditions, and because of constant air assaults of Kiev by Russia is in danger. Russian rockets and drones already struck the National Academy of Sciences of Ukraine, just 250 meters away from the Vernadsky Library building which houses the Judaica collection. Vernadsky's collection includes wax cylinders, several pinkasim, photographs, lyrics of multiple songs, and An-sky's handwritten notes and drafts from the expedition.

Deutsch called the gathered recordings, photographs, and documents a "time capsule", an "ethnographic equivalent of a genizah", and compared it to the Cairo genizah.

=== Music ===
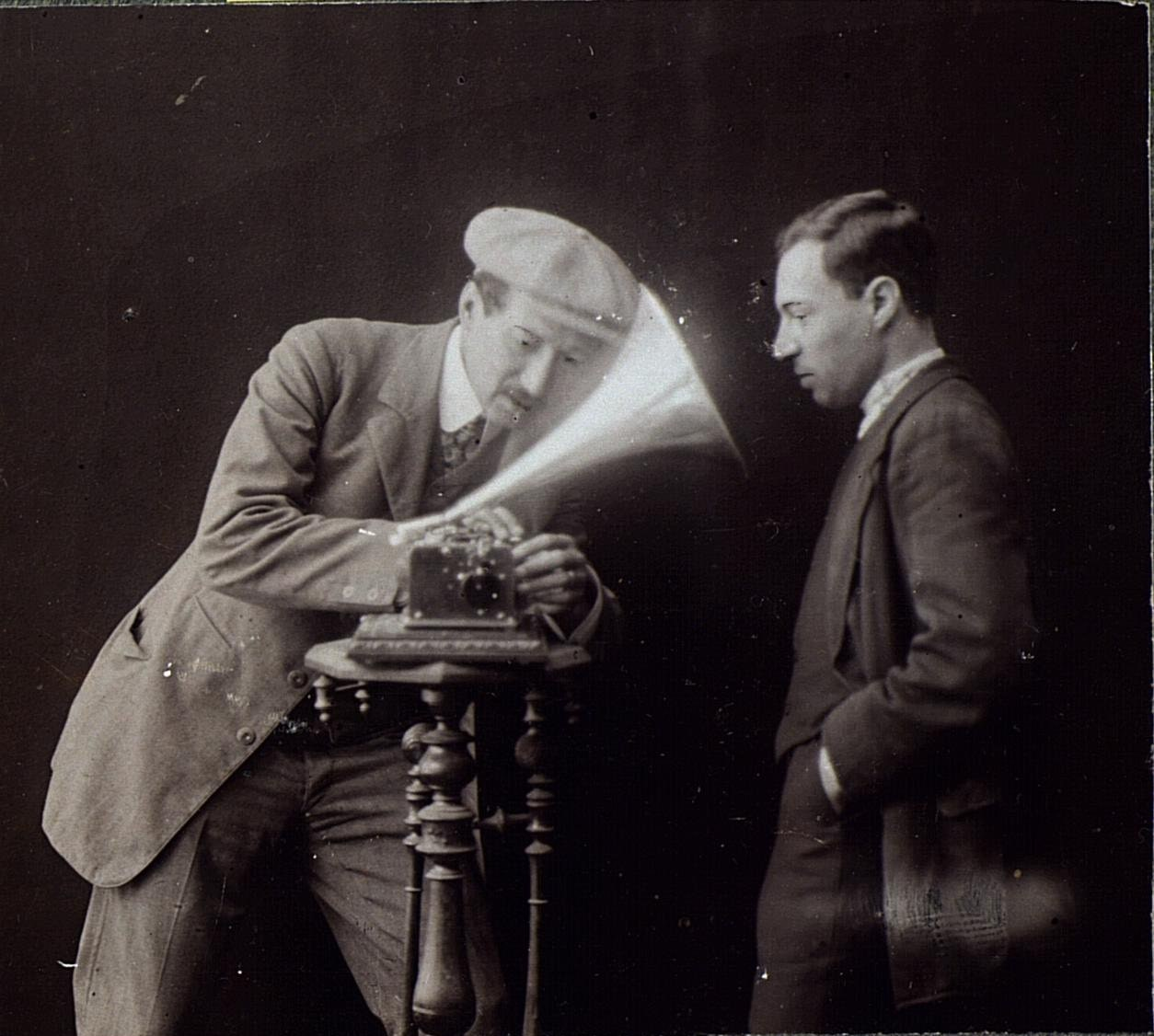
Joel Engel (left) with a phonograph

An-sky and Engel were the first Jewish collectors to use a phonograph in 1912. Recordings made during the expedition contain liturgical music (nigunim, songs for Shabbat, Rosh ha-Shana, Yom Kippur, Passover), "songs of national content", and tunes. Among the performers were hazzanim from choral synagogues, prayer leaders from small synagogues, rabbis, shameses, chorus boys, and amateurs. The expedition was able to record songs and tunes of Bratslaver Hasidim, even though they were a separate, isolated community. Besides Engel and Kiselgof, composers Lazare Saminsky and Hayim Kopyt from the Society for Jewish Folk Music worked with the collected songs, notating and transcribing them.

Phonograph recordings and some of the notes collected during the expedition were transferred to the Institute for Jewish Proletarian Culture in Kiev; Engel's collection was donated to the institute by his widow in 1930; Kiselgof's collection was donated in 1940 by his daughter. Ethnomusicologist Moisei Beregovsky, who worked in the institute and was a collector of Jewish folk songs, published 112 songs from the collection in 1934. In the 1920s and 1930s, Beregovsky himself went on multiple expeditions in Soviet Ukraine to gather songs, nigunim, and purimshpilim. Between 1927 and 1949, he visited Kiev, Odessa, Nikolaev, Dnepropetrovsk, Zaporizhzhya, Vinnitsa, Galicia, and Chernivtsi. During World War II, the institute was evacuated to Ufa; Beregovsky's collection of more than 1,200 wax cylinders was captured, catalogued and transferred to Germany, and was returned after the war ended. Beregovsky resumed his expeditions in 1944, when he returned from evacuation. The institute was closed in 1949, Beregovsky arrested and sent to a labor camp, the collection confiscated and thought to be lost. After the dissolution of the Soviet Union, the music collection was found in the Vernadsky Library in Kiev by Lyudmila Sholokhova. According to the library, 389 out of 500 wax cylinders were catalogued by Beregovsky in the 1920s–1940s. It was digitised and transcribed in the Kiselgof-Makonovetsky Digital Manuscript Project started in 2020 and supported by the Klezmer Institute. The collection includes "850 high-resolution photographs of handwritten music manuscripts and catalog pages, with a total of around 1,300 melodies". The library has 26 notebooks that Kisselgof filled during the expedition, and a catalog based on these notebooks created by Beregovsky in the 1930s. In 1938, Avrom-Yeshieh Makonovetsky prepared a manuscript based on the notebooks, and a catalog.

=== Photography ===
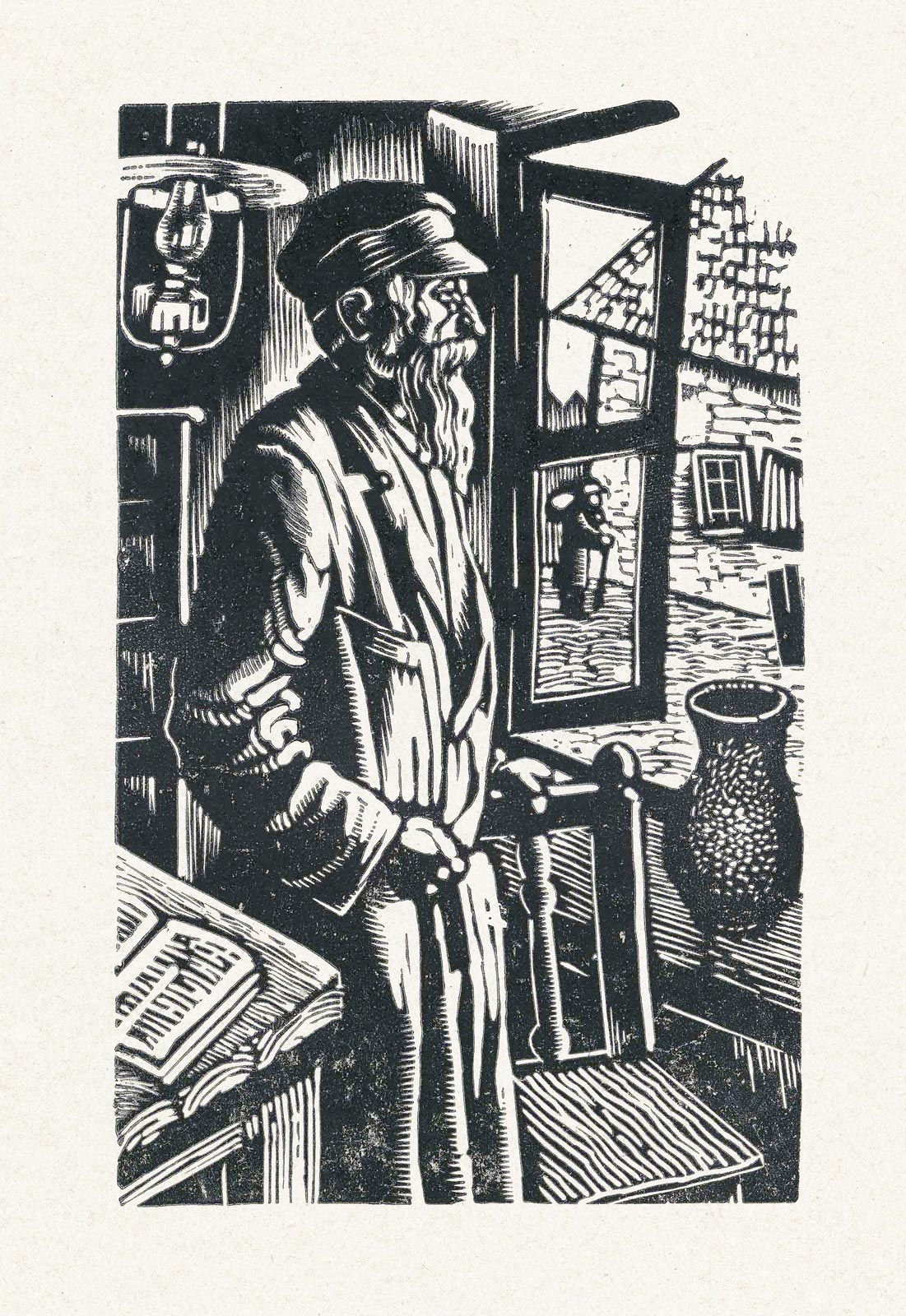
A print made by Solomon Yudovin after the expedition.

Solomon Yudovin, An-sky's 20-year-old nephew, was the official photographer of the expedition. Yudovin was a student of Vitebsk artist Yudel Pen, and learned photography working in photographic studios. His photographs are different from "traditional expedition photography". Morris-Reich writes that there is no clear distinction between scientific and artistic photos made by Yudovin, and that he "sometimes mixed genres within the same photograph", given as an example a photograph of a "Jewish blacksmith from Slavuta, which merges racial discourse, revolutionary Russian iconography, and ideas of Jewish productivity", and even that Yudovin's "racial type photographs of Jewish blacksmiths thus partook of the language of socialist propaganda". Morris-Reich also notes that Yudovin's photographs were not strictly scientific photographs of "racial type". He "treated the subjects gently, with empathy, reverence, even intimacy", and as a result, his photographs "were free of exoticization and strove instead to normalize Jewish visibility".

Photographs made during the expedition are in the collections of several museums in Russia (Russian Museum of Ethnography and Kunstkamera), Israel (Israel Museum and Archive of the History of the Jewish People at Giv'at Ram, Jerusalem), the US, and in private collections. There is no full catalogue of the photographs. Yudovin became a well-known Soviet artist, highly influenced by his experience during the expedition. After the publication of the book Photographing the Jewish Nation in 2009, which gathered around 170 photographs, Yudovin was called simultaneously "a brilliant young photographer" and An-sky's "teenage nephew ... merely a photographer on demand" by different reviewers. Yudovin's photographs were compared to Alter Kacyzne's, Roman Vishniac's, and W. E. B. Du Bois's.

== Questionnaire ==
The great upheaval in Jewish life that has occurred in the last fifty to sixty years has above all devastated our folk traditions, a great many of which have already vanished. With every old man who dies, with every fire, with every exile, we lose a piece of our past. We are rapidly forgetting the most beautiful expressions of traditional life, the customs and beliefs, the old, profound poetic tales, songs, and melodies. The ancient and beautiful synagogues are being abandoned or consumed by fire; their most precious decorations and holy objects are either disappearing or being sold, often into non-Jewish hands. The tombstones of our sages and martyrs are sinking into the earth, their inscriptions rubbed off. In short, our past, soaked with so much holy blood and so many tears shed by martyrs and innocent victims, sanctified by so much self-sacrifice, is being forgotten and disappearing forever.

— S. An-sky, preface to The Jewish Ethnographic Program, translated by Nathaniel Deutsch

=== Composition ===
As early as 1910, An-sky decided to write a book on Jewish ethnography. Later, he wanted to write a more extended study in five volumes, and in 1916 he aimed for 40 volumes; none of these was written. Avrom Yuditsky, one of the students who helped An-sky to gather questions, was asked to create a special questionnaire, titled "Hasidim". It wasn't used during the expedition, and now can be found in the Vernadsky Library in Kyiv. Another questionnaire, "Local Historical Program", was distributed during the expedition. It contained questions not only about Jewish life cycle, but also about important historical events and figures like Sabbatai Zevi and Jacob Frank, 1648 Khmelnytsky pogroms, 1812 war with Napoleon, blood libels, pogroms, emigration to America and others.

An-sky did not invent ethnographic questionnaires; Russian and French ethnographers had already used similar ones. Notable examples include Nikolai Nadezhdin's 1848 program focused on Russian peasants, and Viacheslav Tenishev's 1896 Program of Ethnographic Information about the Peasants of Central Russia, which consisted of around 2,500 questions. (Note: Per Deutsch 2011, pp. 62–63: "the first version of the program officially listed 491 questions, the actual total was closer to 2,500, since almost all of the numbered questions had multiple parts or separate sub-questions") (Note: See Baranov 2007) Another example is Olga Semyonova Tian-Shanskaiai's ethnographic study which also used a questionnaire, conducted during four years in several local villages around her family's estate. The results of the study were published in 1914, after Semyonova's death, titled The Life of "Ivan": Sketches of Peasant Life from One of the Black Earth Provinces.

Initially, An-sky wanted to create a program of 10,000 questions, but soon decided that it was "impractical", and decided to divide it into two parts. Only the first one was finished. An-sky wrote the program in 1914, after the expedition, with the help of ethnographer Lev Shternberg, though his involvement is questionable. The program was written in Yiddish and titled "Dos Yidishe Etnografishe Program" ("The Jewish Ethnographic Program"). The first volume, titled "Der Mentsch" ("The Person"), was published in St. Petersburg in 1914, but was not distributed because of the war. The second volume, "Shabbes un Yontif" ("The Sabbath and Holidays") was not finished. The first volume has 2,087 questions that cover the traditional Jewish life cycle from birth to death, divided into five parts: the Child, from the Kheyder to the Wedding, the Wedding, Family Life, and Death.

Besides the materials gathered during the expedition, Yekhezkel Kotik's autobiography is a possible source used for the questionnaire. Avrom Yuditsky reviewed Kotik's book for the Vilna magazine Ha-Zeman in 1913. Unlike the smaller "Local Historical Program", "Der Mentsch" has no questions about contemporary themes like political parties and labor activism, or emigration to America.

The program was never distributed because of World War I. In the 1920s, the YIVO institute in Vilna used parts of the program and collected answers for the questions from the "Death" chapter.

=== Selected questions from the Program ===
There is something profoundly Jewish about a text consisting entirely of questions.

— Nathaniel Deutsch, Introduction to The Jewish Dark Continent

S. An-sky's "Dos Yidishe Etnografishe Program", published in 1914. The title and the author's name are in Russian, even though the whole text is in Yiddish.

5. The Angel of Death, the Dumah [Guardian Angel of the Dead], the Soul after Death, Gilgul, Dybbuk

- 1967. How do people picture the Angel of Death? His appearance, his characteristics?
- 1968. What weapons or instruments does the Angel of Death employ: a sword or poison or both together?
- 1974. Is it possible to fool the Angel of Death? What stories do you know about such cases? Do people think that you can fool the Angel of Death by changing your name?
- 2006. What does the Khibit-ha-keyver [beating after death] consist of? Which Angels of Destruction [Malakhe-Khabole] punish the dead man? How long does the beating last?
- 2017. Can a dead man come before the Celestial Council of Justice or go to the Patriarchs and Matriarchs to intercede for living people if he wants to or only if he is summoned to the Celestial Council of Justice?
- 2023. Is there a belief that because of certain sins a [deceased] person must return to the world in the form of a human being, an animal, or a bird in order to expiate his sin?
- 2025. Is there a belief that a sinner can be reincarnated as a tree or another kind of plant?
- 2026. Is there a belief that he can be reincarnated as a rock?
- 2035. What does a dybbuk normally say and shout?

7. Paradise, Resurrection of the Dead

- 2065. How do people imagine the place where Paradise is located?
- 2066. Where is the Earthly Paradise? Where is the Supreme Paradise?
- 2071. Does the Lord of the Universe ever visit Paradise?
- 2072. Does he study [the holy texts] with the tsaddiks?
- 2076. Is there a special Paradise for women, and how does it differ from the one for men?
- 2083. If a dead person has been reincarnated several times, in which body will he come alive at the Resurrection?
- 2087. What will life be like after the Resurrection?

=== Translation and modern reception ===
Historian David G. Roskies wrote that An-sky "turned the fieldworker's questionnaire into a modern epic". Historian James Loeffler called it "a manual for the composition of a new 'oral Torah'". Nathaniel Deutsch, who translated and annotated the questionnaire to English, calls it "one of the most illuminating, idiosyncratic, and, until now, unplumbed portraits of this complex reality that anyone has ever created". He notes that Jewish life in the Pale is mostly unimaginable to modern Americans:

From the vantage point of twenty-first-century America, where death has largely been relegated to the hospital instead of the home, cemeteries are no longer a significant space for most communities or individuals, and the dead survive as a memory, if at all, the world depicted in The Jewish Ethnographic Program might as well be Mars in terms of the multiple and meaningful ways that death and the dead are portrayed as inflecting daily life.

Deutsch's translation was published as The Jewish Dark Continent in 2011. Deutsch writes that he consulted with Hasidim in New York, with elderly Jews who emigrated to the US from the shtetls visited by An-sky, and with professional Yiddishists. He called the translation and annotation process a "reverse-engineering" of the program's composition. Deutsch's book received positive reviews.

=== Other Jewish questionnaires ===
An-sky's questionnaire was not the only one targeted at Eastern European Jews. Folklorist Friedrich S. Krauss created the first survey (on "secret languages") in the 1890s, which he published and urged people to send their examples to him. Rabbi Max Grunwald composed the first questionnaire focused on Jewish folklore (Fragebogen) in 1896. It had no questions but was an "outline for collectors" of two pages, with 34 sections like ‘onomastics and dialect’, ‘literature’, ‘belief and legend’, ‘tradition and custom’, ‘augury, magic and folk-medicine’, ‘house-building and folk-costume’. Immanuel Olswanger created a similar questionnaire in 1917, which was published by the Swiss Folklore Society. In the Russian Empire, Hebrew writers from Odessa Alter Druyanov, Haim Nahman Bialik and Yehushua Hanna Ravnitski created a questionnaire in 1914, similar to Grunwald's "in its emphasis on genres and its lack of question-marks". After the October Revolution and World War I, YIVO created a similar questionnaire in Yiddish. Hungarian folklorist Bernhard Heller published his questionnaire in 1930, with questions related not to folklore, but "to the house’s furniture, jewelry, clothes, crafts". Historian Dani Schrire argues that questionnaires "prescribe the knowledge they seek to document", and that different questionnaires "constructed different 'lores' and different 'folks'".

== Legacy and assessment ==
Though An-sky's expedition and questionnaire were unprecedented in scale, and An-sky himself is often called "the father of Jewish ethnography", his influence on the field was described as negligible. Nevertheless, Jack Kugelmass calls An-sky a "progenitor" of Jewish anthropology; Israeli folklorist Dov Noy called An-sky "a pioneer in folkloristics and ethnography", while Noy's student, ethnographer Haya Bar-Itzhak, referred to An-sky as "the keystone of Jewish folklore studies". In Israel, Noy created "a network of narrative "collectors"" to collect Jewish folktales from different communities. In 1977, he started the "Beit She'an Project", a fieldwork study focused on the Moroccan Jewish community in Beit She'an. Noy called it "the second Jewish expedition" after An-sky's expedition.

Eastern European Jewry was studied after the October Revolution which abolished the Pale of Settlement; YIVO was one of the main engines of such studies. After World War II and the Holocaust, shtetl life was completely destroyed. Multiple memorial books about the former communities were published by survivors or people who emigrated before the war; one of the most influential books about shtetl life was the 1952 book Life Is with People by Mark Zborowski (Note: It was later revealed that Zborowski was not an anthropologist born in a shtetl, but a Soviet spy.) and Elizabeth Herzog. Uriel Weinreich and Marvin Herzog founded the Language and Culture Archive of Ashkenazic Jewry (LCAAJ) at Columbia University in New York; they also employed a "questionnaire of more than two hundred pages" and gathered hundreds of hours of interviews in Yiddish. Kugelmass compares An-sky's program with Barbara Myerhoff's book Number Our Days. Gabriella Safran writes that the purpose of An-sky's expedition was "to depict and to mourn a Jewish way of life that they perceived as dying", an approach called "salvage ethnography".

Ethnographers in the Soviet Union started their field work in the former settlements of the Pale at the end of the 1980s, a few years before the collapse of the USSR. Among them were Valerii Dymshits, Benyamin Lukin, Boris Khaimovich, and Ilya Dvorkin. They were unaware of An-sky and his expedition. Researchers started to rediscover it, and in 1987, Igor Krupnik noted that "The 1914 program had no value for a modern Jewish ethnography". In the early 1990s, Dymshits realised that their expedition followed An-sky's route from St. Petersburg to the Ukrainian shtetls. Dvorkin described it as "we were An-sky number two, so to speak". Vilnius Research Institute interviewed "hundreds of individuals" in 2002–2009; these recordings are now held in the Archives of Historical and Ethnographic Yiddish Memories. In 2022, Mauas and Rotman published an "Updated Ethnographic Questionnaire on Israeli Time"; according to the authors, it "expands or updates" An-sky's questionnaire. It contains questions about emergency and Shabbat sirens in Israel.

Historian Dani Schrire compares An-sky's expedition with the Jesup North Pacific Expedition (1897–1902) to Siberia, but notes that unlike remote north regions of the Russian Empire, An-sky's targets were easily reached by train; "In actuality, the Ansky expedition led the party of scholars to towns with high literacy rates and with youths who had a scholarly attitude themselves who spoke another dialect of Yiddish." He also calls the expedition An-sky's "performance", which staged the shtetl into a "symbol of what he considered a spiritual people".

Historian Simon J. Bronner notes that even though An-sky's expedition is well known in the field of Jewish folklore studies, "he is rarely cited in histories of folklore studies in Europe".

The An-sky Yiddish Heritage Ensemble is a New-York-based klezmer band formed "to celebrate the 100th Anniversary of the historic An-sky Expedition of 1911-1914". The band members are Michael Alpert, Pete Rushefsky, Jake Shulman-Ment, and Ethel Raim.

== See also ==
- Yiddishkeit, a term used to describe "Jewishness" or "Jewish essence" of Ashkenazi Jews in general and the traditional Yiddish-speaking Jews of Eastern and Central Europe
- Sergey Prokudin-Gorsky, Russian photographer known for colour photos of the Russian Empire of the early 20th century
- Filaret Kolessa phonograph cylinder collection, recordings of kobzar music made by Filaret Kolessa in Ukraine in c. 1904–1910
- Archives of the Planet, a project to photograph human cultures around the world (1908–1931)

== Sources ==
- Abeliovich, Ruthie (2023). Caplan, Debra; Moss, Rachel (eds.). "The Dybbuk before The Dybbuk: A Bastard History". The Dybbuk Century. University of Michigan Press: 15–37. doi:10.3998/mpub.11522250. ISBN 978-0-472-07643-7. JSTOR 10.3998/mpub.11522250.
- An-sky, S. (2003). Neugroschel, Joachim (ed.). The Enemy at His Pleasure: A Journey Through the Jewish Pale of Settlement During World War I. Macmillan. ISBN 978-0-8050-5945-8.
- An-sky, S. (2016). 1915 diary of S. An-sky: a Russian Jewish writer at the Eastern Front. Translated by Zavadivker, Polly. Bloomington (Indiana): Indiana university press. ISBN 978-0-253-02045-1.
- Avrutin, Eugene M. (2013). "The Jewish Dark Continent: Life and Death in the Russian Pale of Settlement". The Journal of Modern History. 85 (4): 988–989. doi:10.1086/672570.
- Baranov, Dmitry (2007). "V. N. Tenishev's 'Peasant' Programme: Ideology and Practice". Forum for Anthropology and Culture. 3: 193–205.
- Bronner, Simon J. (14 June 2023). "Introduction: Jewish Folklore and Ethnology: What, Why, and Whither?". Jewish Folklore and Ethnology. 1 (1).
- Caplan, Debra; Moss, Rachel Merrill, eds. (2023). The Dybbuk Century: The Jewish Play That Possessed the World. University of Michigan Press. ISBN 978-0-472-90385-6.
- Chajes, J. H. (2017). "Ansky's "Dybbuk" as Heretical Midrash". Jewish Studies Quarterly. 24 (1): 66–84. doi:10.1628/094457017X14883764175487. ISSN 0944-5706. JSTOR 44861505.
- Deutsch, Nathaniel (2011). The Jewish Dark Continent: Life and Death in the Russian Pale of Settlement. Cambridge, Mass: Harvard University Press. ISBN 978-0-674-04728-0.
- Dymshits, Valery (2005). "Lost and Found". East European Jewish Affairs. 35 (1): 7–12. doi:10.1080/13501670500191439. ISSN 1350-1674.
- Duker, Abraham G. (1931). ""Evreiskaia Starina" a Bibliography of the Russian-Jewish Historical Periodical". Hebrew Union College Annual. 8/9: 525–603. ISSN 0360-9049. JSTOR 23503637.
- Feldman, Walter Zev (2016). Klezmer: Music, History and Memory. Oxford University Press. ISBN 978-0-19-024451-4.
- Golant, N. G.; Novik, A. A. (2020). "Photographs by S. B. Yudovin Stored in the MAE RAS: Towards the History of the Collection" (PDF). Kunstkamera (in Russian). 8 (2): 137–164. doi:10.31250/2618-8619-2020-2(8)-137-164.
- Greenbaum, Avraham; Beizer, Michael [in Russian] (1992). "Yehiel Ravrebe: Jewish Poet and Scholar". Jews and Jewish Topics in the Soviet Union and Eastern Europe (PDF). The Hebrew University of Jerusalem.
- Greenspoon, Leonard J. (2017). "The Dybbuk: The Origins and History of a Concept". olam he-zeh v'olam ha-ba: This World and the World to Come in Jewish Belief and Practice. Purdue University Press. ISBN 978-1-61249-514-9.
- Huhn, Ulrike (2025). "Rediscovering the shtetl in the late Soviet period: the Leningrad Jewish Independent Movement of the 1980s and the re-establishment of Jewish studies". Holocaust Studies. 31 (3): 517–545. doi:10.1080/17504902.2024.2392326. ISSN 1750-4902.
- Ivanov, Vladislav (2006). "An-sky, Evgeny Vakhtangov, and The Dybbuk". In Safran, Gabriella; Zipperstein, Steven J. (eds.). The Worlds of S. An-sky: A Russian Jewish Intellectual at the Turn of the Century. Stanford University Press. ISBN 978-0-8047-5344-9.
- Kiel, Mark W. (January 1992). "Vox Populi, Vox Dei: The Centrality Of Peretz In Jewish Folkloristics". Polin: Studies in Polish Jewry. 7: 88–120. doi:10.3828/polin.1992.7.88.
- Kotlyar, Eugeny (2017). "Premonition of the Apocalypse: Synagogue Images and the Motif of the Destruction of the Jewish World in Art of the Revolutionary Period" (PDF). Judaica Ukrainica. 6: 13.
- Kugelmass, Jack (2006). "16. The Father of Jewish Ethnography?". In Safran, Gabriella; Zipperstein, Steven J. (eds.). The Worlds of S. An-sky: A Russian Jewish Intellectual at the Turn of the Century. Stanford University Press. doi:10.1515/9781503620247. ISBN 978-1-5036-2024-7.
- Levin, Neil W. (2024), "S. An-ski's The Dybbuk An Inexhaustible Operatic Inspiration" (PDF), YIVO Institute for Jewish Research
- Lissitzky, El (2019) [1923]. "וועגן דער מאָהליווער שול: זכרונות" [On the Mogilev Shul: Recollections]. Milgroym. Translated by Cohen, Madeleine – via In geveb.
- Lockwood, Jeremiah (2022). "The Lost World of Russia's Jews: Ethnography and Folklore in the Pale of Settlement by Abraham Rechtman, Nathaniel Deutch and Noah Barrera (review)". Ab Imperio. 2022 (1): 266–269. doi:10.1353/imp.2022.0019. ISSN 2164-9731.
- Loeffler, James (2010). "2. National Voices, Imperial Echoes: Joel Engel and the Russian Jewish Musical Fin de Siècle". The Most Musical Nation: Jews and Culture in the Late Russian Empire. Yale University Press. doi:10.12987/yale/9780300137132.003.0003. ISBN 978-0-300-13713-2.
- Loeffler, James (2 July 2020). "The 'Lust Machine'". Tablet Magazine. (adapted from Loeffler, James (2020a). "The 'Lust Machine': Recording and Selling the Jewish Nation in the Late Russian Empire". Polin: Studies in Polish Jewry. 32: 257–277. doi:10.3828/polin.2020.32.257.)
- Malin, Yonatan; Crowder, Christina; Byom, Clara; Shanahan, Daniel (2022). "Community Based Music Information Retrieval: A Case Study of Digitizing Historical Klezmer Manuscripts from Kyiv". Transactions of the International Society for Music Information Retrieval. 5 (1): 208. doi:10.5334/tismir.135.
- Marcus, Noah (2022). Performing Jewish Rituals on Stage: The Case of S. An-sky's The Dybbuk: or Between Two Worlds (Thesis). Université d'Ottawa / University of Ottawa.
- Mauas, Lea; Rotman, Diego (2022). "Toward an Updated Ethnographic Questionnaire on Israeli Time". Possession and Dispossession: Performing Jewish Ethnography in Jerusalem. De Gruyter. pp. 64–71. doi:10.1515/9783110786279-007. ISBN 978-3-11-078627-9.
- Molisak, Alina; Garliński, Jarosław (2025). "Narratives of the First World War: Multiple Jewish Perspectives". Polin Studies in Polish Jewry. 37 (1): 239–254. doi:10.3828/polin.2025.37.239. ISSN 2516-8681.
- Morris-Reich, Amos (2012). "Science and "Race" In Solomon Yudovin's Photographic Documentation of Russian Jewry, 1912–1914". Images. 6 (1): 52–78. doi:10.1163/18718000-12340004.
- Morris-Reich, Amos (2022). "Chapter 5. Photography and Rupture: S. An-sky, Solomon Yudovin, and the Documentation of Russian Jewry". Photography and Jewish History: Five Twentieth-Century Cases. University of Pennsylvania Press. pp. 149–184. ISBN 978-0-8122-9852-9.
- Neugroschel, Joachim, ed. (2000). The Dybbuk and the Yiddish Imagination: A Haunted Reader. Syracuse University Press. ISBN 978-0-8156-2871-2.
- Rechtman, Abraham (2021) [1958]. The lost world of Russia's Jews: ethnography and folklore in the pale of settlement. Translated by Deutsch, Nathaniel; Barrera, Noah. Bloomington, Indiana: Indiana University Press. ISBN 978-0-253-05694-8. (Yidishe etnografye un folklor in Yiddish)
- Roskies, David G. (1992). "Ansky Lives!". Jewish Folklore and Ethnology Review. 14 (1–2): 66.
- Safran, Gabriella (2000). "Dancing with Death and Salvaging Jewish Culture in Austeria and The Dybbuk". Slavic Review. 59 (4): 761–781. doi:10.2307/2697418. JSTOR 2697418.
- Schrire, Dani (2012). "Ethnographic questionnaires: after method, after questions" (PDF). Retrospective Methods Network Newsletter. 4 - Approaching Methodology: 97–104. ISSN 2324-0636.
- Schrire, Dani (2025). "Traveling on a Dogsled to the Jordan Valley: Fieldwork in the Study of Folklore of Jews". Journal of Folklore Research. 62 (1–2). Indiana University Press: 113–135. doi:10.2979/jfr.00018.
- Shazar, Zalman (1967). "Baron David Günzberg and His Academy". The Jewish Quarterly Review. 57, The Seventy-Fifth Anniversary Volume of the Jewish Quarterly Review. University of Pennsylvania Press: 1–17. JSTOR 1453481.
- Sholokhova, Lyudmila (2004). "Zinoviy Kiselhof as a Founder of Jewish Music Folklore Studies in the Russian Empire at the beginning of the 20th Century". In Grözinger, Karl-Erich (ed.). Klesmer, Klassik, jiddisches Lied: jüdische Musikkultur in Osteuropa. Otto Harrassowitz Verlag. pp. 63–72. ISBN 978-3-447-05031-9.
- Sholokhova, Lyudmila (2009). "Hasidic Music from the An-Ski Collection: A History of Collecting and Classification". Musica Judaica. 19: 103–130. ISSN 0147-7536. JSTOR 26454529.
- Spinner, Samuel Jacob (2012). "Chapter 4. An-sky – Salvaging Lives and Saving Culture During the First World War". Jews Behind Glass: The Ethnographic Impulse in German-Jewish and Yiddish Literature, 1900–1948 (PhD). Columbia University. doi:10.7916/D8XG9Z8T.
- Veidlinger, Jeffrey (2013). "The Jewish Dark Continent: Life and Death in the Russian Pale of Settlement". Slavic Review. 72: 166–167. doi:10.5612/slavicreview.72.1.0166.
- Weisser, Albert (1954). The modern renaissance of Jewish music, events and figures, Eastern Europe and America. New York: Bloch Pub. Co.
- Weisser, Albert (1981). "The Music Division of the Jewish-Ethnographic Expedition in the Name of Baron Horace Guinsbourg (1911–1914)". Musica Judaica. 4 (1): 1–7. ISSN 0147-7536. JSTOR 23687569.
- Zavadivker, Polly (2013). Blood and Ink: Russian and Soviet Jewish Chroniclers of Catastrophe from World War I to World War II (PDF) (PhD). UC Santa Cruz.
- Zavadivker, Polly (2024). "The Golden Torah. The Rescue of Jewish Sacred Objects". A Nation of Refugees: Russia's Jews in World War I. Oxford University Press. ISBN 978-0-19-762935-2.
- Zemtsovsky, Izaly (2006). "The Musical Strands of An-sky's Texts and Contexts". In Safran, Gabriella; Zipperstein, Steven J. (eds.). The Worlds of S. An-sky: A Russian Jewish Intellectual at the Turn of the Century. Stanford University Press. pp. 203–231. ISBN 978-0-8047-5344-9.
- Субботин, А. П. (1890). В черте еврейской оседлости : Отрывки из экон. исслед. в зап. и юго-зап. России за лето 1887 г. Вып. 1–2 / Белосток, мест. Острополь, мест. Полонное, Бердичев, Житомир, Киев, Одесса и их районы [In the Jewish Pale of Settlement: Excerpts from Economic Studies in Western and South Western Russia for the Year 1887. Issues 1–2 / Bialystok, Ostropol, Polonnoe, Berdychev, Zhytomir, Kiev, Odessa, and its neighbourhoods] (in Russian). Санкт-Петербург: Экономический журнал.
