= Khurbn =

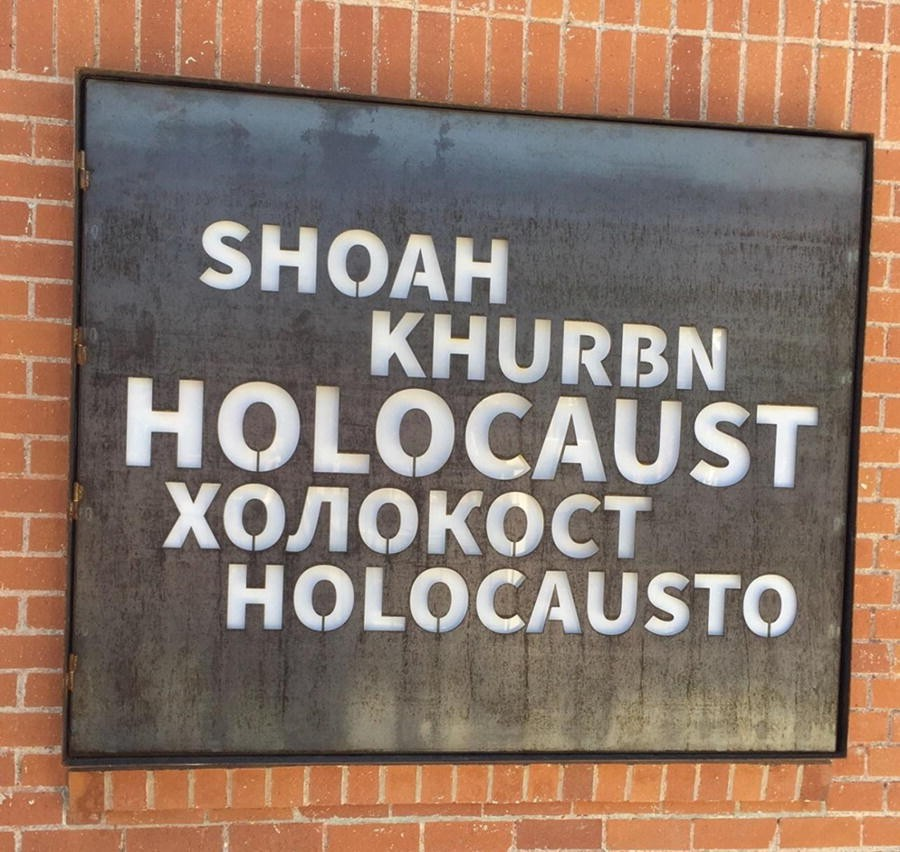
Multilingual sign at the Tucson Jewish Museum and Holocaust Center

The Hebrew-derived Yiddish word khurbn (Yiddish: חורבן) means a "cataclysmic, utter destruction", and is widely used in Yiddish to describe several major catastrophes affecting the Jewish people, including the destruction of the first and the second temples, pogroms in Russia during the First World War, and the Holocaust.

Writer and social activist S. An-sky, who was a relief worker during the First World War, wrote a book titled Khurbn Galitsiye (Hebrew: חורבן גאליציע, "The Destruction of Galicia").

Since World War II, the word khurbn (more fully, khurbn Eyrope (חורבן אײראָפּע) has often been used to denote the Holocaust. It is sometimes used in the titles of memorial books (yizkor books) about the destroyed shtetls, like Khurbn Proskurov, Rakhel Feygenberg's A Pinkes fun a Toyter Shtot (Khurbn Dubove) ("Chronicle of a Dead City: The Destruction of Dubove"), Max Kaufmann's early (1947) history of the genocide in Latvia, Khurbn Letland, or Yehoshue Perle's Khurbn Varshe. Raul Hilberg's most important work was titled The Destruction of the European Jews.

Holocaust studies are sometimes called khurbn-forshung (lit. "destruction research").

"Khurbn Yiddish" refers to the sociolect shaped by Yiddish speakers' experiences during the Holocaust, which caused them to develop new words and slang, particularly relating to theft, protest, and sexuality. It is also called khurbn-shprakh. Historian Nachman Blumental described it:

When I found myself within the borders of Eastern Poland in mid-1944, meeting the few Jews that I found there, I was almost unable to understand their language (loshn). So many modifications had occurred in the short period of my absence—in those roughly three years.

== See also ==
- Names of the Holocaust

== Sources ==
- Spinner, Samuel Jacob (2012). "Chapter 4. An-sky – Salvaging Lives and Saving Culture During the First World War". Jews Behind Glass: The Ethnographic Impulse in German-Jewish and Yiddish Literature, 1900–1948 (PhD). Columbia University. doi:10.7916/D8XG9Z8T.
- Zavadivker, Polly (2013). Blood and Ink: Russian and Soviet Jewish Chroniclers of Catastrophe from World War I to World War II (PDF) (PhD). UC Santa Cruz.
