= Amos Morris-Reich =

Israeli history professor

- עמוס מוריס-רייך
- Occupation: Professor

Academic background
- Education: Hebrew University of Jerusalem
- Thesis: Disciplinary Paradigms and Jewish Assimilation: The Jews as Objects of Research
- Doctoral advisor: Sander Gilman, Eli Lederhendler, Gabriel Motzkin

Academic work
- Discipline: History
- Sub-discipline: Modern Jewish history, History of science and technology

Amos Morris-Reich (Hebrew: עמוס מוריס-רייך) is a history professor at Tel Aviv University whose research involves the intersection of modern Jewish history and the history of modern science and technology.

== Works ==
=== The Quest for Jewish Assimilation in Modern Social Science ===
In his 2012 book The Quest for Jewish Assimilation in Modern Social Science, Morris-Reich explores the connections between academic disciplines and notions of Jewish assimilation. The book focuses on anthropologist Franz Boas and sociologist Georg Simmel.

=== Race and Photography ===
In his 2016 book Race and Photography: Racial Photography as Scientific Evidence, 1876–1980 Morris-Reich examines the use of photography in the study of race. He examines the transformation of photography's scientific status from the late nineteenth and early twentieth centuries, including its use in the Weimar and Nazi periods and beyond.

=== Photography and Jewish History ===
Morris-Reich's 2022 book Photography and Jewish History: Five Twentieth Century Cases is a study of photography in Jewish history. The case studies examined in the book are Albert Kahn's attempts to establish a photographic archive in Paris, the work of Helmar Lerski, a photographer in Mandatory Palestine, on "Jewish and Arab types", the photography of Nazi genetics professor Eugen Fischer; the street photography of Robert Frank; and Solomon Yudovin's photographs in S. An-sky's attempt to introduce photography into the study of Russian Jewry prior to World War I.

=== “Nazi Fantasy”: Vilém Flusser and History as Site of Experiment ===
Morris-Reich's 2025 book “Nazi Fantasy”: Vilém Flusser and History as Site of Experiment is a study of the work of Vilém Flusser.

=== Other works ===
Morris-Reich has co-edited with Dirk Rupnow, for Ideas of "Race" in the History of the Humanities and with Margaret Olin, for Photography and Imagination. He edited the first collection of essays by Georg Simmel in Hebrew: Georg Simmel: "How is Society Possible?" and Other Essays and the first collection of essays by Sander Gilman in Hebrew: The Jewish Body and Other Protruding Organs: A Selection of Essays by Sander Gilman.

With a special interest in the history of methodology and epistemology, Morris-Reich has also published numerous articles on the conceptual history of the social sciences, history of antisemitism and racism, Jewish cultural history, history of photography, and biologically oriented human sciences. At the Cohn Institute for the History and Philosophy of the Science and Ideas his teaching and supervision focus on the history and philosophy of the social and human sciences, history and philosophy of photography and technology, and historical contingency and counterfactuals.
