= Solomon Yudovin =

Belarusian Jewish artist (1892–1954)

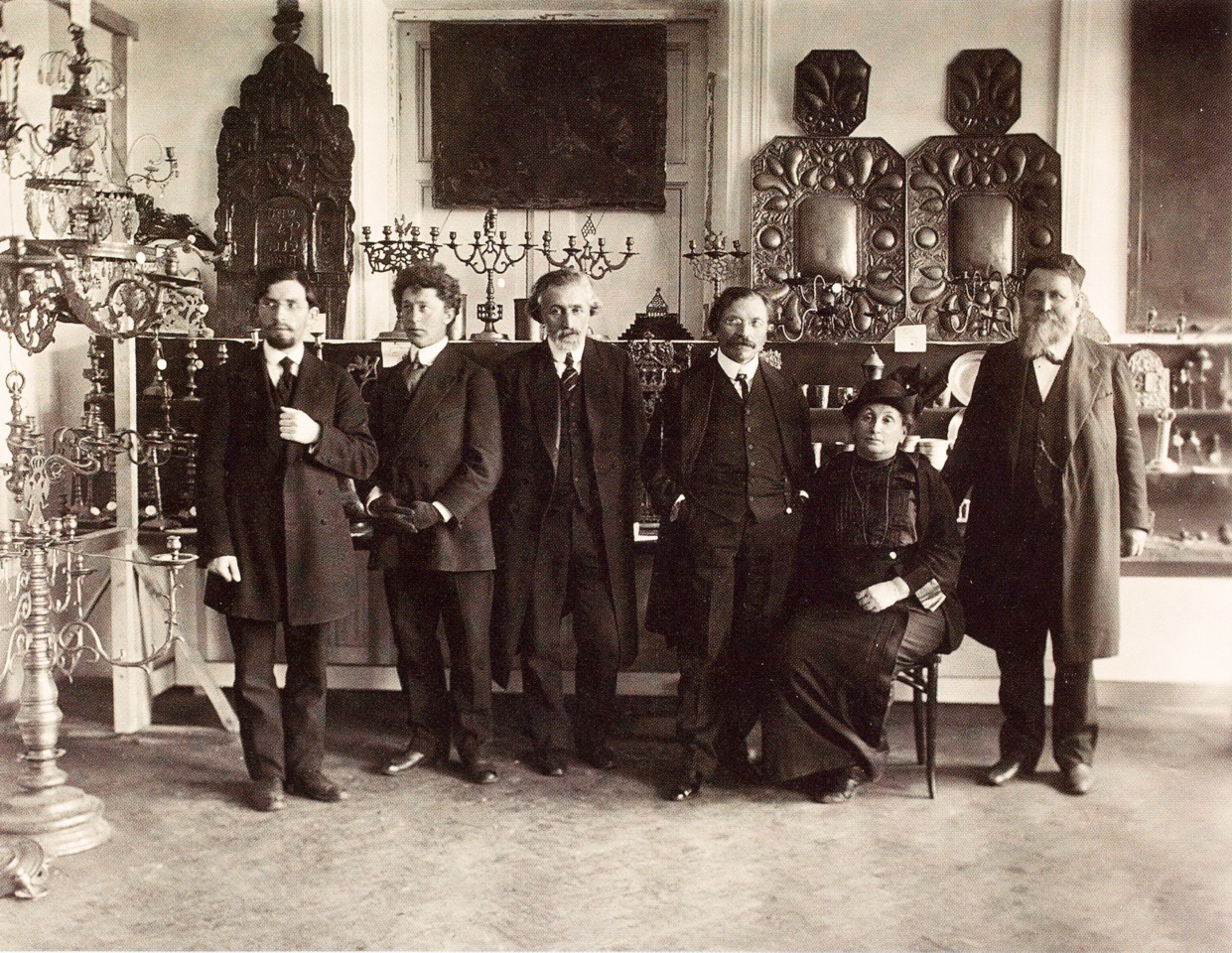
Members of the S. An-sky's ethnographic expedition, 1914. From left to right: Abraham Rechtman, Solomon Yudovin, S. An-sky, Sholem Aleichem and his wife Olga Rabinovitch, Moisei Ginsburg

Solomon Yudovin (or Iudovin) (Yiddish: שלמה יודאווין, 1892-1954) was a Belarusian Jewish graphic artist, photographer, and researcher of Jewish folk art.

== Biography ==
Yudovin was born into a family of artisans in Beshenkovichi, Vitebsk Governorate of the Russian Empire (now Belarus). He studied art from 1906 to 1910 at the School of Drawing and Painting in Vitebsk, under Yehuda Pen. He moved to St. Petersburg in 1910, to study at the School of the Society for the Encouragement of Arts from 1910 to 1911 and with artists Mstislav Dobuzhinsky and Moisey Bernstein from 1911 to 1913.

From 1912 to 1914, Yudovin participated in the Jewish Ethnographic Expedition organized by S. An-sky's Jewish Historical and Ethnographic Society, documenting and copying examples of Jewish folk art and ornaments. This sparked his lifelong interest in Jewish artistic traditions. In 1920 he, together with M. Malkin, published the album Jewish Folk Ornament (Yidisher Folks-Ornament) featuring 26 of his linocut prints.

From 1918 to 1923, Yudovin lived in Vitebsk, teaching at the Art School and Jewish Pedagogical Technical School. His prints from this period often depicted shtetl life and Jewish folk themes, combining stylized folk elements with realistic details. After moving to Petrograd (St. Petersburg) in 1923, Yudovin worked as a curator at the Jewish Museum, created in materials of S. An-sky's expedition, until its closure in 1928. In the 1930s to 1940s his work became more narrative and detailed to conform to Socialist Realism, though still focused on Jewish subjects and folk imagery. He illustrated books by Jewish authors and created prints portraying Jewish life on collective farms.

Yudovin had solo exhibitions in Vitebsk (1926), Yaroslavl (1944), Leningrad (1956) and Jerusalem (1991). His art blended Russian avant-garde influence with a commitment to documenting and celebrating Jewish cultural traditions through his prints, drawings and book illustrations.

== Gallery ==
Yudovin's graphic works

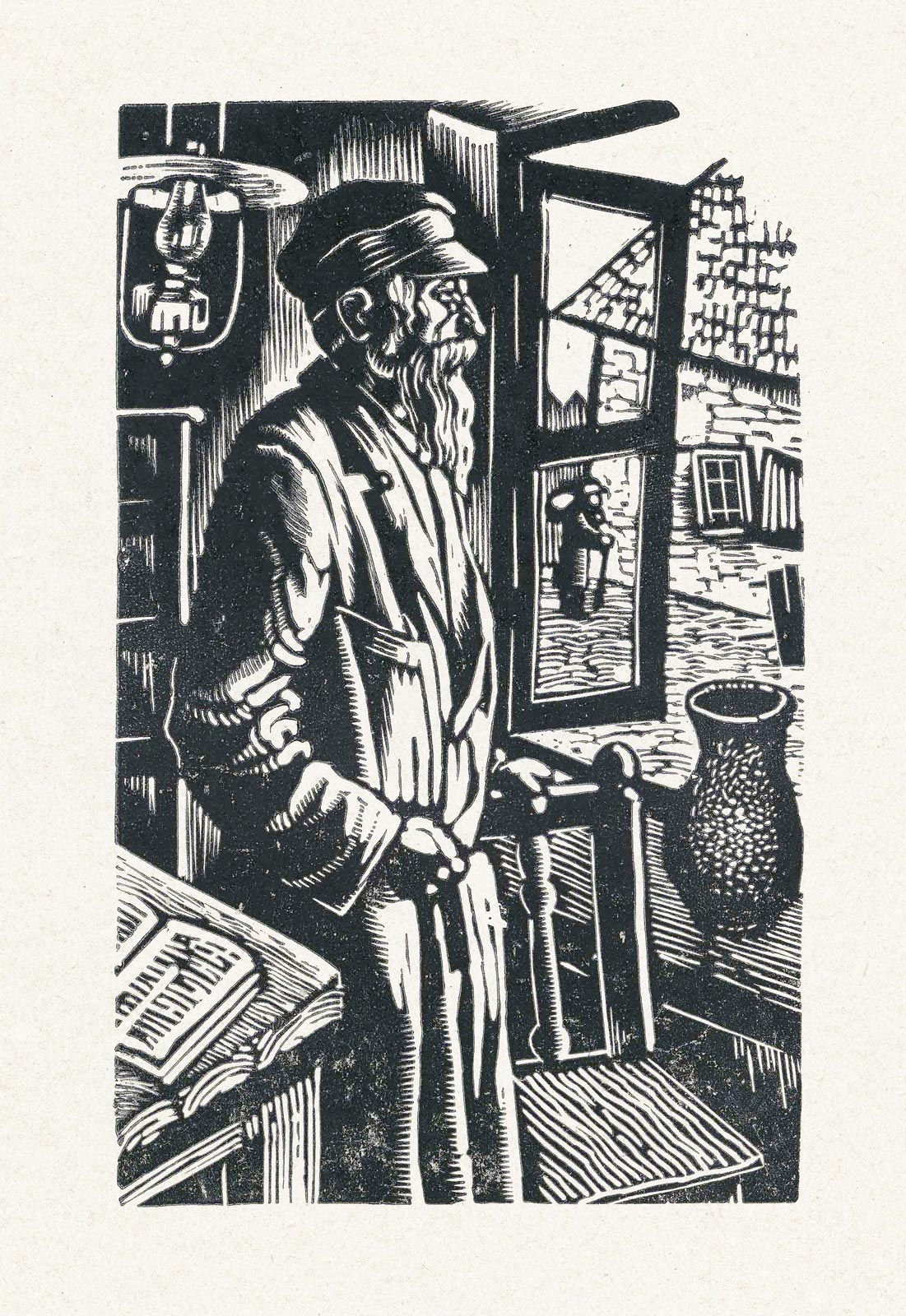
Old man near a window, 1923

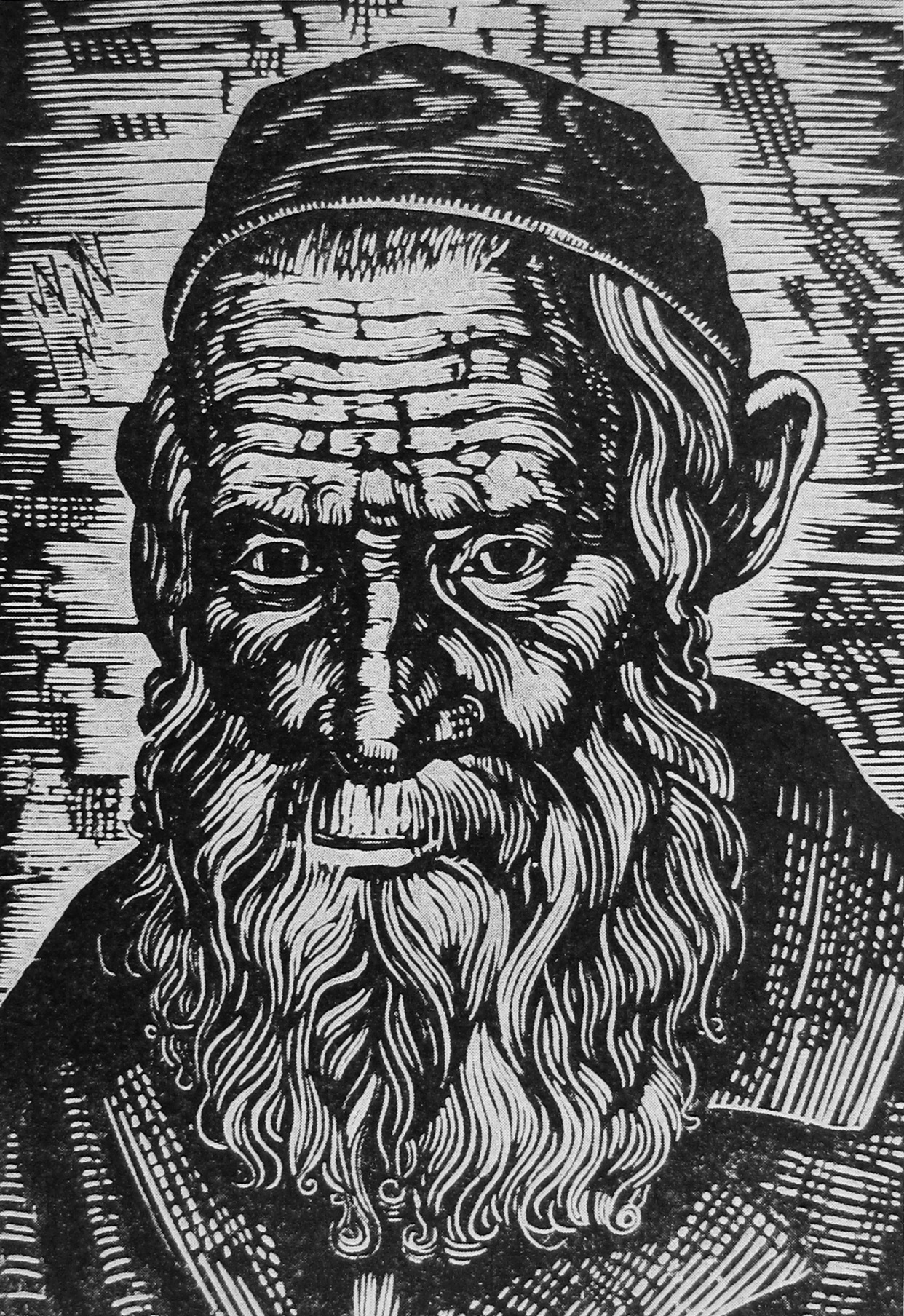
Old man, 1926

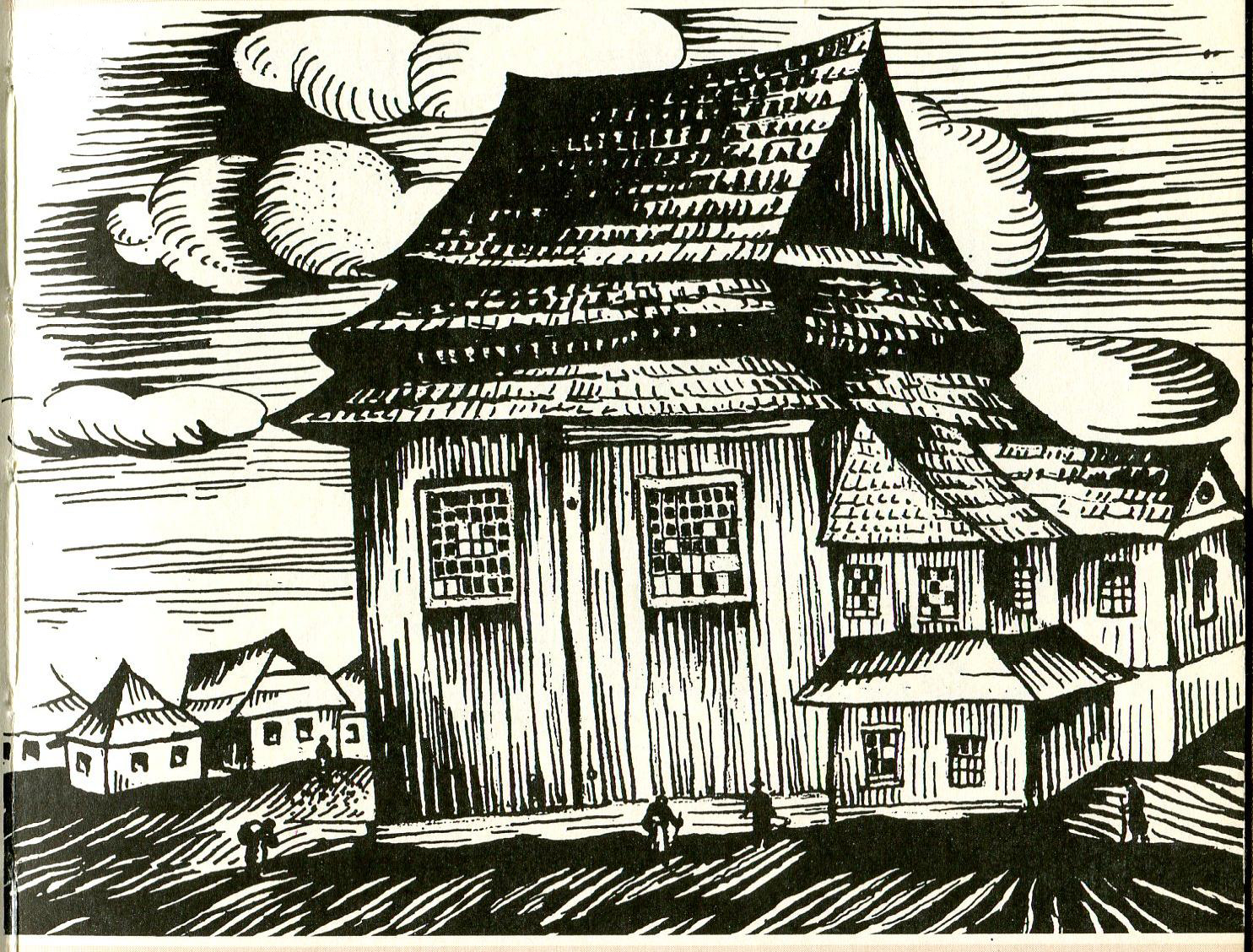
The Beshenkovichi synagogue, c.1920-1929

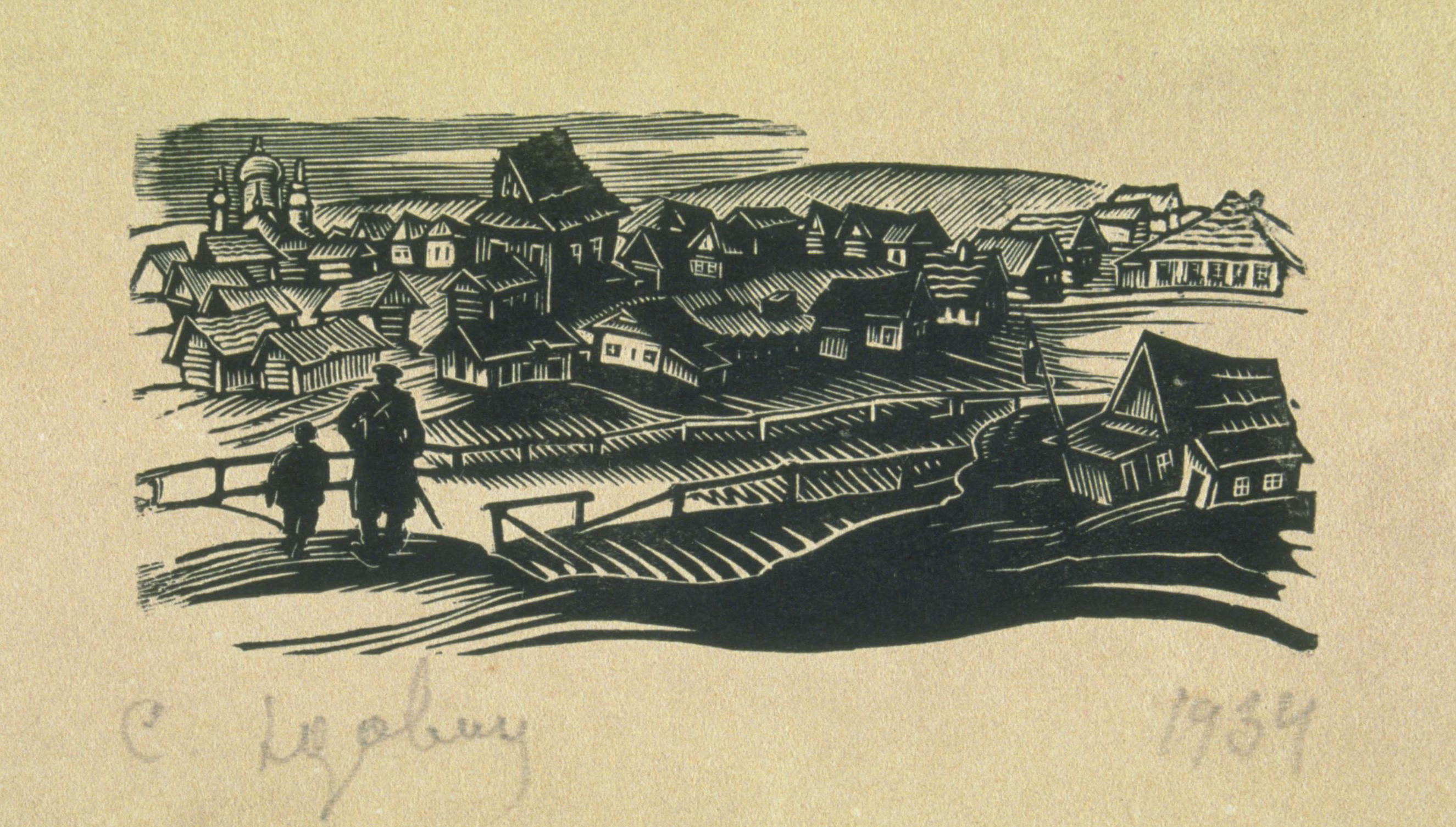
Beshenkovichi, Dzvina, 1934

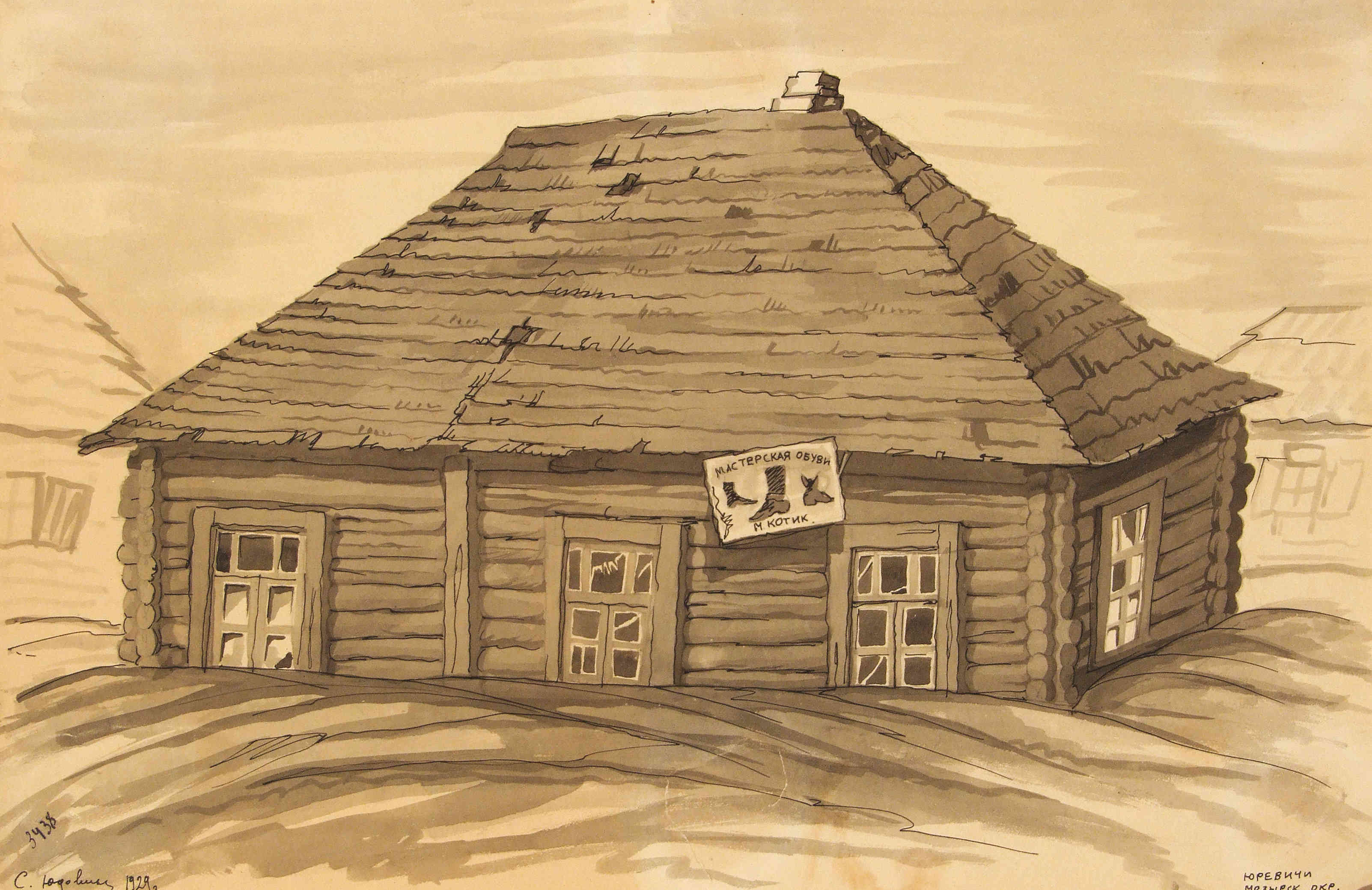
Shoemaker, 1929
Yudovin's photos made during S. An-sky's expedition

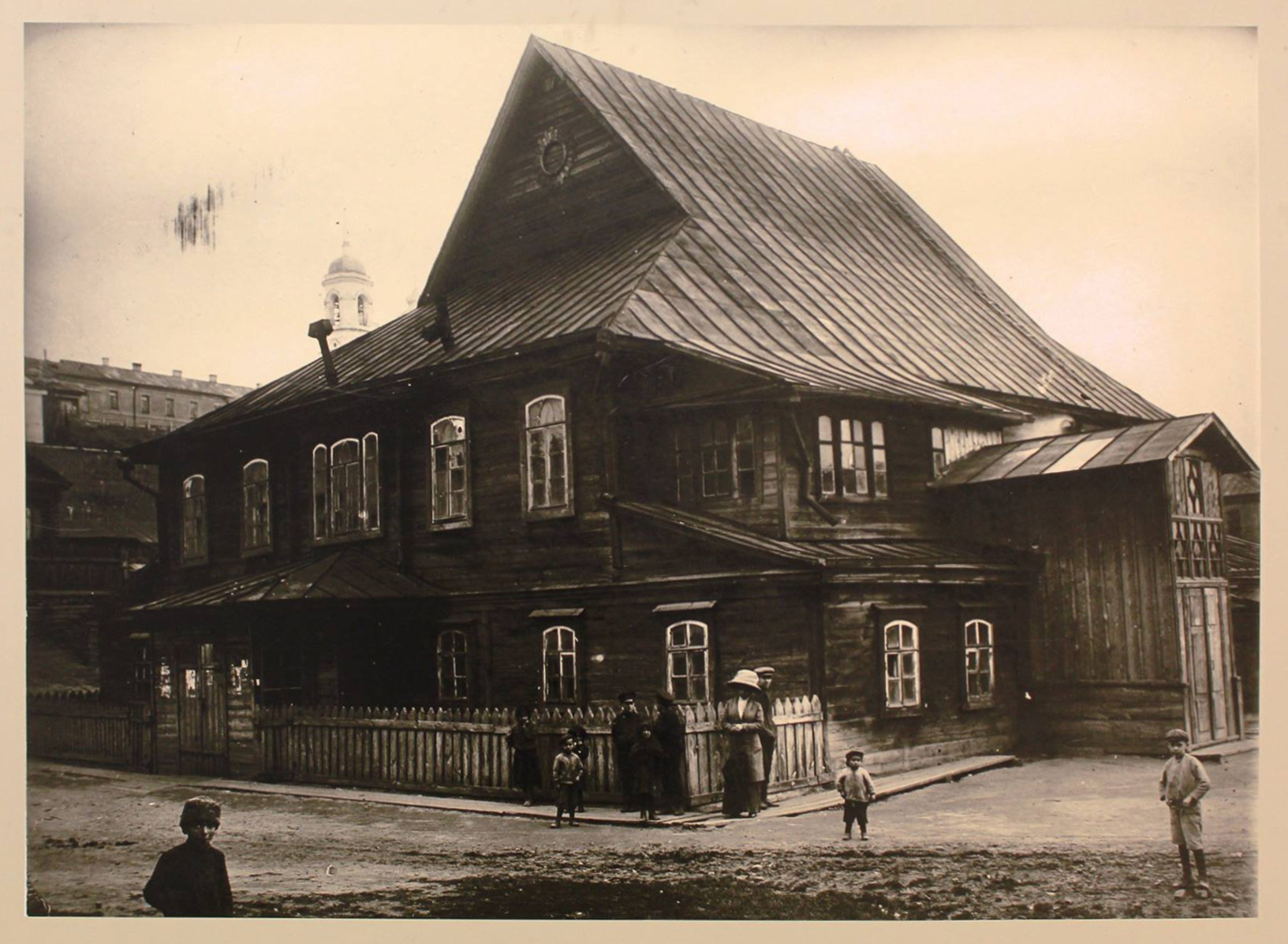
Cold Synagogue, Mogilev, 1913

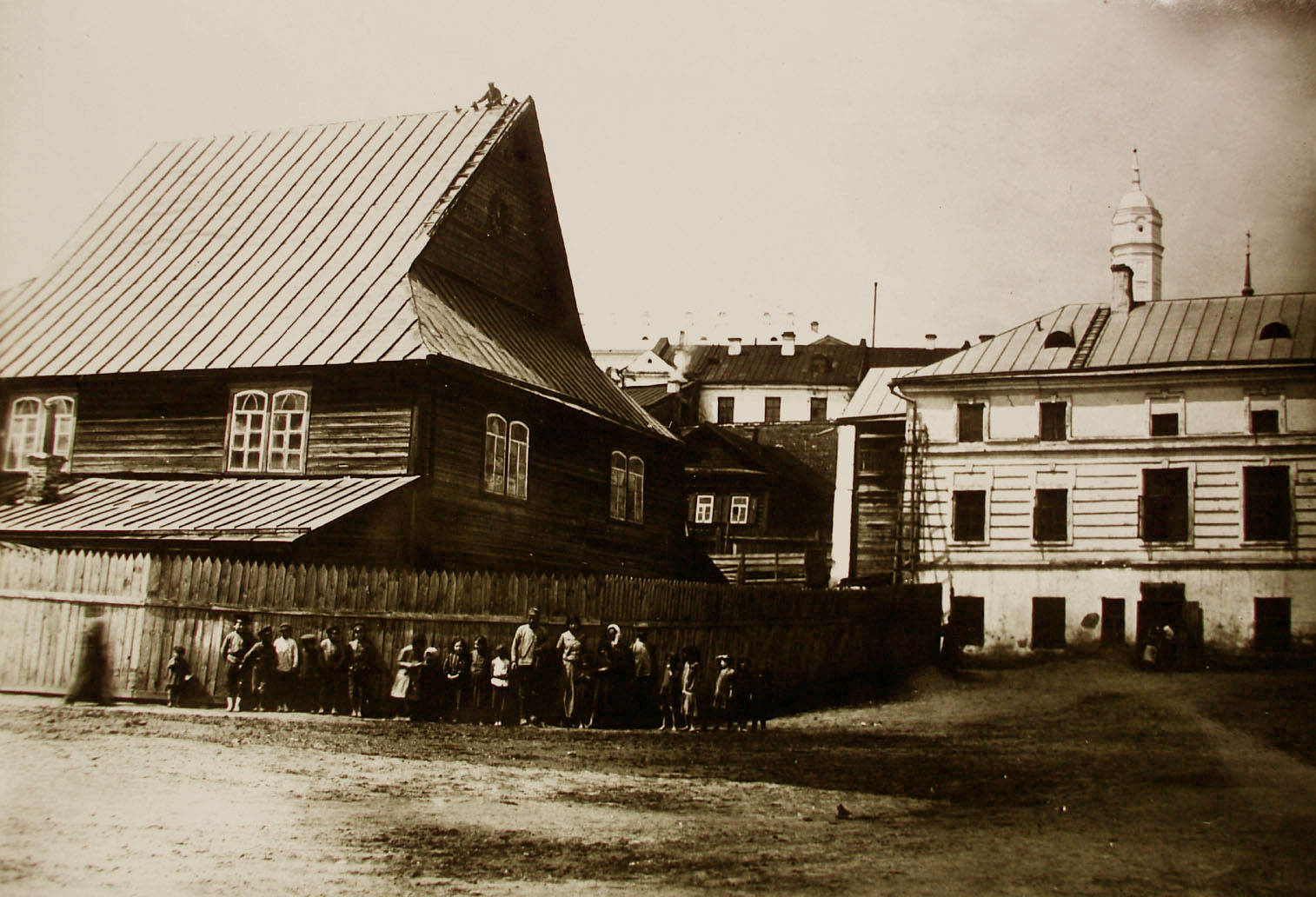
Cold Synagogue, Mogilev, 1913

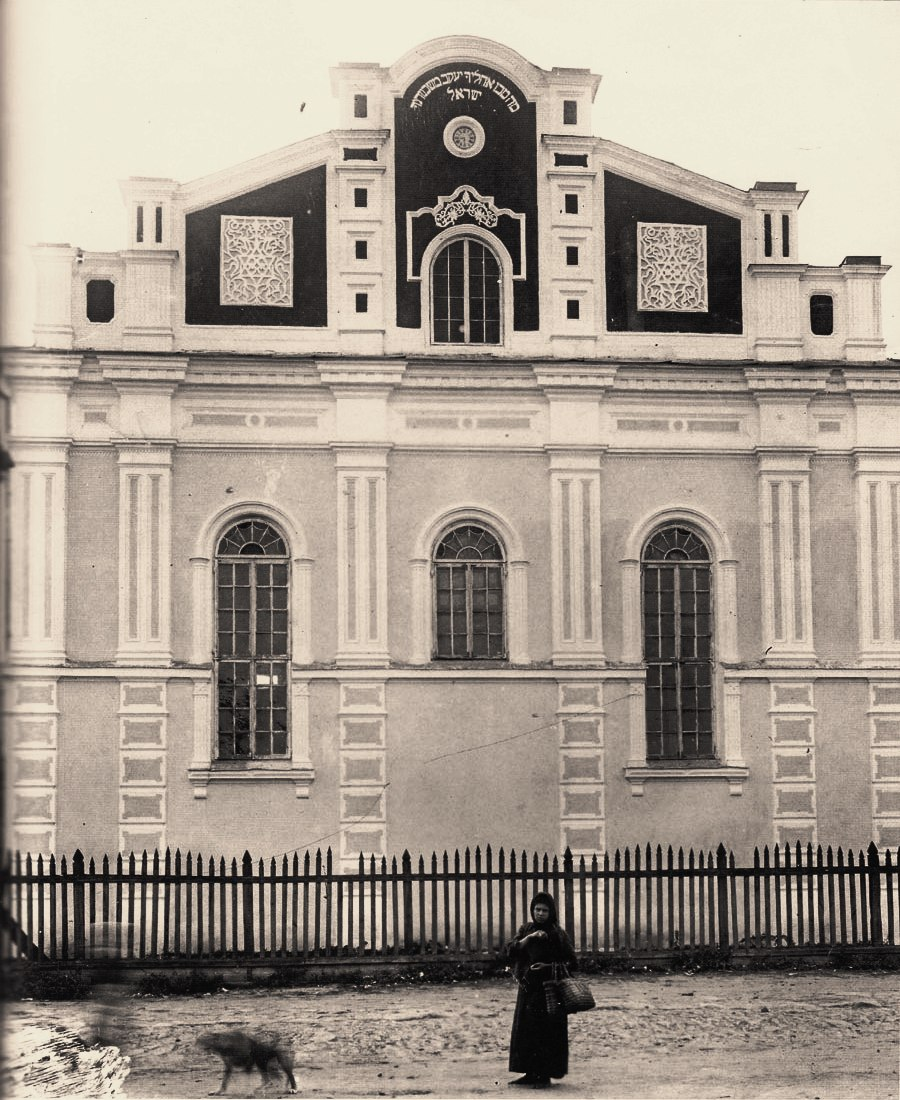
Synagogue in Korets

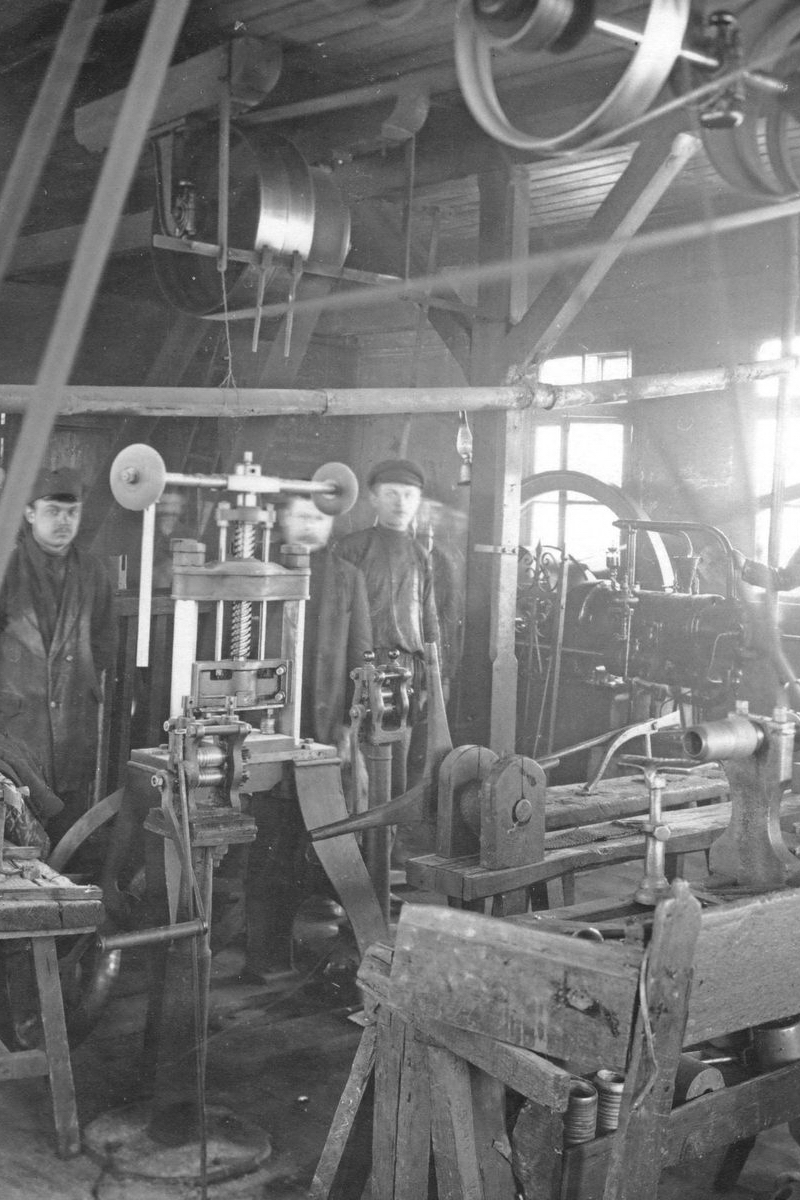

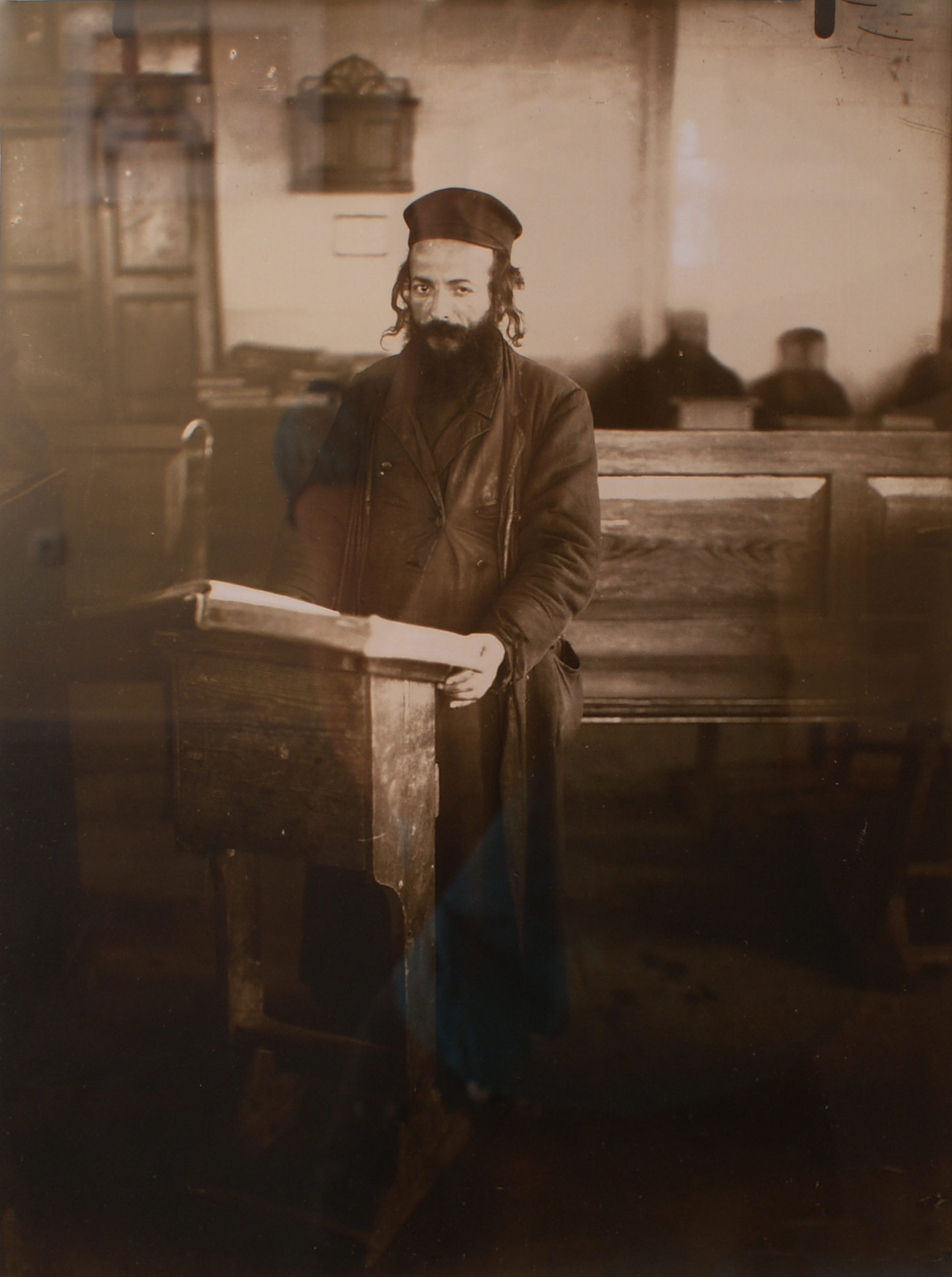
