= Saul Ginsburg =

Jewish writer and historian

- Саул Гинзбург
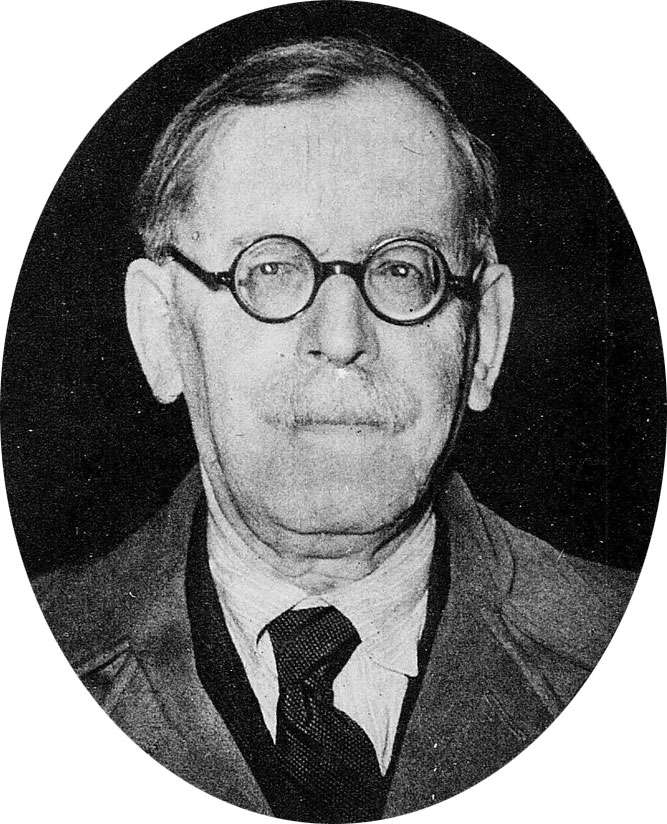
- Born: Sha'ul Moiseevich Ginsburg; 1866; Minsk, Russian Empire
- Died: November 16, 1940 (aged 73–74); New York City, U.S.
- Resting place: New York City
- Education: University of St. Petersburg (LL.B., 1891)
- Occupations: Historian, author, editor
- Known for: Founding of Der fraynd
- Spouse: Bronislawa Berchine Ginsburg
- Children: 1

Saul Ginsburg (Sha'ul Moiseevich Ginsburg, שאול גינזבורג; born Minsk, 1866 – died New York, 16 November 1940) was a Jewish-Belarusian American author, editor, and historian of Russian Jewry.

== Biography ==
Ginsburg was born in Minsk, in the Russian Empire. He received both a traditional Jewish and a secular education. In 1891 he graduated with a law degree from the University of St. Petersburg.

In 1892 Ginsburg began writing for the Russian-Jewish periodical Voskhod in St. Petersburg, where he remained for the next several decades. His contributions to Voskhod included articles on Russian Jewish history, and a regularly appearing survey of the Hebrew press (under the pseudonym "Ha-Kore"). In 1899 he became a member of the editorial board.

Together with Peysakh Marek, Ginsburg compiled an anthology of Yiddish-language folk songs (Evreiskiia narodnyia piesni v Rossii), which was published as a supplement to Voskhod in 1901, and came to be regarded as a landmark work in Jewish folklore.

In 1903 Ginsburg founded Der fraynd (The Friend), the first Yiddish-language newspaper to be published in St. Petersburg, and the first Yiddish daily in the Russian Empire. With its high literary and orthographic standards, the paper is credited with helping to shape the development of modern Yiddish culture.

Ginsburg withdrew as an editor at Der fraynd in 1908 and in the following years devoted himself more fully to studies of the political, social, and cultural history of Russian Jewry. In 1913 he published a study of Russian Jews at the time of the invasion of Russia in 1812 during the Napoleonic Wars (Otechestvennaya voina 1812 goda i russkie yevrei). He also co-edited the Russian-language journal Perezhitoe (1908–1913), which specialized in the publication of primary sources for Russian Jewish history.

In 1919 Ginsburg became a professor of Jewish history at the newly opened Institute of Higher Jewish Studies in Petrograd – as St. Petersburg was by then known – which offered the first university-level program in Jewish studies in Russia. He continued to teach there until the institute closed, in 1925, by which time the Soviet Union had been established (in 1922), and the city had been renamed Leningrad (in 1924).

Ginsburg emigrated from the Soviet Union in 1930, settling at first in Paris. Around 1933 he immigrated to the United States and settled in New York City. There he published popular historical essays regularly in the Yiddish-language newspaper Forverts (Jewish Daily Forward). A three-volume Yiddish-language collection of Ginsburg's historical writings on Russian Jewry (Historishe verk) was published in New York in 1937–1938; two additional volumes of collected writings were published posthumously, in 1944 and 1946.

== Personal life ==
Saul Ginsburg was married to Bronislawa Berchine Ginsburg. The couple had one son, Michael Ginsburg, who, like his parents, emigrated to the United States. Bronislawa Ginsburg sometimes assisted her husband in his research and writing, and the preparation of articles for the newspaper. Michael Ginsburg went on to have a distinguished career in the United States as a professor of Slavic studies.

== Published works ==
In Yiddish

- Historishe verk [Historical works]. 3 vols. New York: Shoyl Ginzburg 70-Yoriger Yubiley Komitet [Saul Ginsburg Testimonial Committee], 1937–1938.
  - Vol. 1. Fun idishen leben un shafen in Tsarishen Rusland [Jewish struggles and achievements in Czarist Russia]. Part 1.
  - Vol. 2. Fun idishen leben un shafen in Tsarishen Rusland [Jewish struggles and achievements in Czarist Russia]. Part 2.
  - Vol. 3. Idishe layden in Tsarishen Rusland [Jewish martyrdom in Czarist Russia]. Includes a bibliography of Ginsburg's works, 1892-1937, by Isaac Rivkind (p. 377-416).
- Amolike Petersburg: forshungen un zikhroynes vegn yidishn lebn in der residents-shtot [Petersburg as it was: research and memories about Jewish life in the imperial capital]. New York, Saul Ginsburg shriftn-komitet, 1944.
- Meshumodim in Tsarishn Rusland [=Jewish apostates in Czarist Russia]. New York: CYCO-bicher-farlag, 1946.
- Co-authored with P. S. Marek: Yiddish Folksongs in Russia. Photoreproduction of the 1901 St. Petersburg edition. Edited and annotated, and with an introduction by Dov Noy. Ramat Gan: Bar-Ilan University Press, 1991. Folksongs in Yiddish characters and romanization; introductions in Russian and Yiddish.
  - Evreskiia narodnyia piesni v Rossii. St. Petersburg: Redaktsiia "Voskhoda", 1901. Original edition, with folksongs in Yiddish characters and romanization; introductions in Russian.

In English

- The Drama of Slavuta. Translated from the Yiddish by Ephraim H. Prombaum; with introductory and concluding remarks, glossary, and suggested reading. Lanham: University Press of America, 1991. A series of 12 articles published in the Forverts (Jewish Daily Forward) from Dec. 12, 1937 to Feb. 27, 1938, collectively entitled "Di Slaviter drame."
