= James Loeffler =

American historian

- Education: Harvard University
- Occupations: Historian, professor, author

James Loeffler is an American historian. He holds the Felix Posen Professorship in Modern Jewish History at Johns Hopkins University and is co-editor of AJS Review.

== Education ==
Loeffler studied social studies at Harvard University, graduating with an A.B. magna cum laude in 1996. He then studied history at Columbia University, earning an M.A. in 2000 and a Ph.D. with distinction in 2006. Loeffler did postgraduate studies in Jewish religious and political thought at the Hebrew University of Jerusalem and the Pardes Institute for Jewish Studies.

== Research ==
Loeffler is a Fellow of the Institute for Advanced Israel Studies at Brandeis University. His book Rooted Cosmopolitans: Jews and Human Rights in the Twentieth Century received the 2019 Dorothy Rosenberg Prize from the American Historical Association and the Jordan Schnitzer Prize from the Association for Jewish Studies.

== Bibliography ==
- The Law of Strangers. Jewish Lawyers and International Law in the Twentieth Century. Cambridge: Cambridge University Press. 2019. ISBN 9781107140417.
- Rooted Cosmopolitans: Jews and Human Rights in the Twentieth Century. Yale: Yale University Press. 2018-05-04. ISBN 9780300217247.
- The Most Musical Nation. Jews and Culture in the Late Russian Empire. Yale: Yale University Press. 2013-09-10. ISBN 9780300198300.
