= Rimsky-Korsakov (disambiguation) =

Nikolai Rimsky-Korsakov (1844–1908) was a Russian composer.

Rimsky-Korsakov may also refer to:

- Rimsky-Korsakov (film), a 1952 Soviet film by Gennadi Kazansky and Grigori Roshal
- 4534 Rimskij-Korsakov, main belt asteroid
- Rimsky-Korsakov Archipelago, a group of islands near Vladivostok
- Rimsky-Korsakov Apartment and Museum, a memorial museum in St. Petersburg, Russia

== People with the surname ==
- Alexander Rimsky-Korsakov (1753–1840), Russian general
- Andrey Rimsky-Korsakov (1878–1940), Russian musicologist and son of Nikolai
- Ivan Rimsky-Korsakov (1754–1831), Russian courtier
- Mikhail Rimsky-Korsakov (1873–1951), Russian zoologist, eldest son of Nikolai
- Nadezhda Rimskaya-Korsakova (1848-1919), Russian pianist and composer, wife of Nikolai
- Voin Rimsky-Korsakov (1822–1871), Russian explorer and elder brother of Nikolai

== See also ==
- Rimsky (disambiguation)
- Korsakov (disambiguation)
