= Rimsky =

Rimsky is both a surname and a given name. Notable people with the name include:

- Alexander Rimsky-Korsakov (1753–1840), Russian general
- Ivan Rimsky-Korsakov (1754–1831), Russian courtier and lover of Catherine the Great
- Voin Rimsky-Korsakov (1822–1871), Russian navigator, hydrographer, and geographer
- Nikolai Rimsky-Korsakov (1844–1908), Russian composer
- Nadezhda Rimskaya-Korsakova (1848–1919), Russian pianist and composer, wife of Nikolai
- Andrey Rimsky-Korsakov (1878–1940), Russian musicologist and son of Nikolai
- Nicolas Rimsky (1886–1941), Russian-born French film director and actor
- Rimsky Yuen (b. 1964), former Secretary for Justice of Hong Kong from 2012 to 2018.
