= Vitia =

Vitia may refer to:

- Viti, Kosovo, a town and municipality in Kosovo
  - FC Vitia, a football club
- Arben Vitia (born 1973), Kosovar medical doctor and politician
- Njomza (Njomza Vitia, born 1994), Albanian-American singer
- Vitia, errors in the interpretation of signs of the augur

== See also ==
- Vityaz (disambiguation)
