= Yuliya Veysberg =

Russian composer

Yuliya Lazarevna Veysberg (Yuliya Rimskaya-Korsakova) (Julia Weissberg) (b. 6 January 1880 [O.S. 25 December 1879], d. March 1, 1942) was a music critic and composer.

== Life and career ==
Yuliya Veysberg was born in Orenburg, Russian Empire. She studied at the Women's University, and in 1912 graduated from St. Petersburg Conservatory where she studied composition under Nikolai Rimsky-Korsakov. From 1912 to 1914 she continued her studies in Berlin with Engelbert Humperdinck and Max Reger.

She returned to St. Petersburg and subsequently married Andrey Rimsky-Korsakov, musicologist and son of Rimsky-Korsakov, and from 1915 to 1917 served on the editorial board of, and contributed reviews to, the first Russian music magazine, Muzïkal'nïy sovremennik, which the couple founded. She and her son, Vsevolod Rimsky-Korsakov, died in World War II during the Siege of Leningrad conducted by Nazi German troops.

== Works ==
Veysberg's compositions included vocal works, a symphony, a scherzo, and a fantasia. Selected works include:

- At Night (symphonic poem for orchestra)
- Chinese songs
- Chanson d'automne: Les sanglots longs, op. 2 (Zwei Lieder) no. 1 (Text: Paul Verlaine)
- Le ciel est, par-dessus le toit, op. 2 (Zwei Lieder) no. 1 (Text: Paul Verlaine)

She also produced several operas, such as:

- Русалочка (The Little Mermaid, 1923). The libretto for the opera was written by Sophia Parnok and was based on the fairy tale of the same name by Hans Christian Andersen.
- 'Гюльнара (Gyul'nara, 1935). The libretto for the opera was written by Sophia Parnok and was completed at the end of 1931. It was dedicated to the opera singer, Maria Maksakova. As Parnok died before production, Veysberg made final edits to the lyric before its debut in 1935.
- Гуси-лебеди (Geese-Swans, 1937). The libretto for the children's opera was written by Samuil Marshak and Veysberg.
- Мертвая царевна (The Dead Princess, 1937). The libretto for the radio opera was written by Alexander Pushkin.
- Зайкин дом (A Little Rabbit's House, 1937). The libretto for the children's opera was written by W. Weltmann.

== Recordings ==
Fifteen of Veysberg's art songs were released in 2025 on the album Yulia: Forgotten Songs of Yulia Weissberg Rimsky-Korsakov by soprano Sarah Moulton Faux and pianist Konstantin Soukhovetski, produced and engineered by Judith Sherman. It includes the "Rautendelein" cycle, songs based on Chinese poetry, and settings of texts by Sophia Parnok and Sarojini Naidu.
