= Russian ship Almaz =

Steam clipper of the Imperial Russian Navy

Almaz (Russian: Алмаз) (Note: Sometimes also transcribed as Almas.) was a steam clipper of the Imperial Russian Navy, a three-masted ship built in 1862 at the Admiralty Shipyards in Saint Petersburg. It belonged to a class of clippers and served as a sail-steamer in the Russian fleet. Over its career, it was part of the Baltic Fleet of the Russian Empire and was eventually scrapped in 1881.

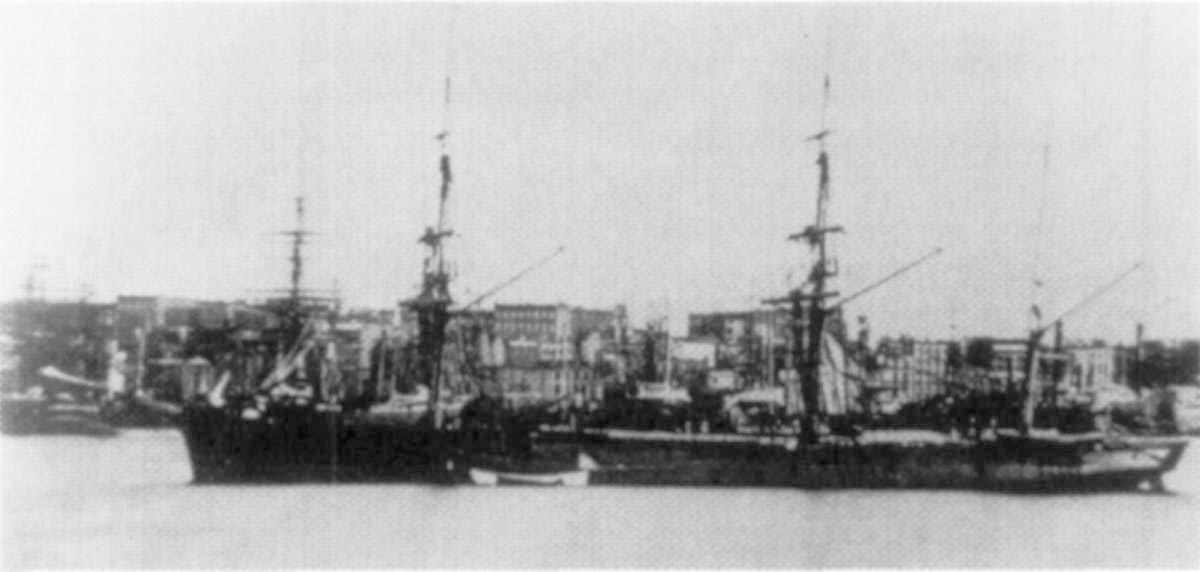
The Russian naval clipper Almaz in New York Harbor in October 1863. The Russian composer Nikolai Rimsky-Korsakov served as a midshipman on this ship and later wrote about this cruise.

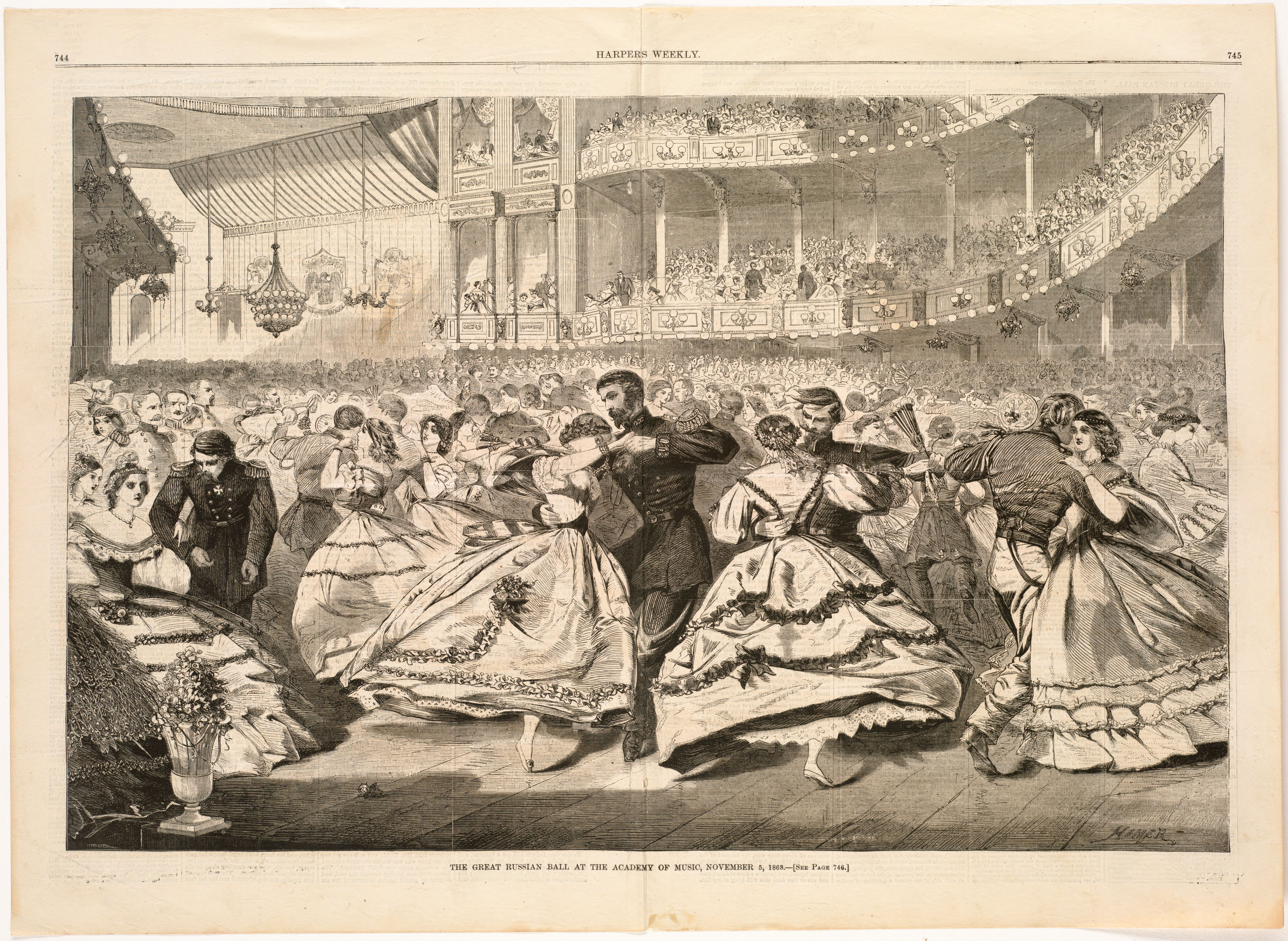
The great Russian ball at the Academy of Music in New York, November 5, 1863 (Winslow Homer)

== History ==
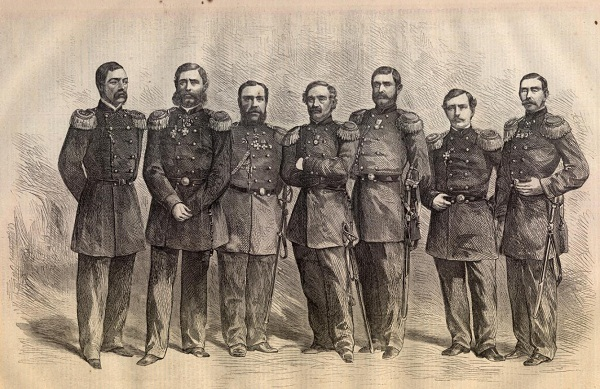
Captains of the Expedition of the Russian fleet to the shores of North America (1863–1864). From left to right: P. A. Zelenoy (clipper Almaz), I. I. Butakov (frigate Oslyabya), M. Ya. Fedorovsky (frigate Alexander Nevsky), Admiral S. S. Lesovsky (Commander of the Squadron), N. V. Kopatov (frigate Peresvet), O. K. Kremer, (corvette Vityaz), R. A. Lund (corvette Varg)

Under the command of Rear Admiral Stepan Lesovsky, the Atlantic squadron with Almaz embarked on a diplomatic world voyage and a military demonstration by Russia during the American Civil War. The ship visited cities as New York City, Baltimore and Washington, D.C., at the time of the Union's greatest threat from the Confederate raids. During the war, the United Kingdom and France supported the Confederacy.

The voyage also had political dimensions. It aimed to thwart the plans of a European coalition against Russia and contributed to support for the Union during the American Civil War. The presence of the Russian fleet in American waters was perceived as a gesture of solidarity: One of the biggest public attractions of the 1863 season in New York was the Russian Ball in the Academy of Music, held on November 5 in honor of the officers of the Russian fleet.

On board was the young Russian composer Nikolai Rimsky-Korsakov, who had joined the Imperial Russian Navy as a midshipman in 1862. During the nearly three-year voyage, he devoted himself intensively to music, worked on his First Symphony, and studied works by composers such as Hector Berlioz's Treatise on Instrumentation. His impressions of the sea and the countries he visited later influenced his compositions, including the famous work Scheherazade (1888). The journey on Almaz was formative for Rimsky-Korsakov and influenced his later career as a composer and music teacher. It helped develop his interest in maritime themes and his ability to depict landscapes and moods musically. The experiences from this time shaped many of his works and contributed to his status as a key figure in 19th-century Russian music.

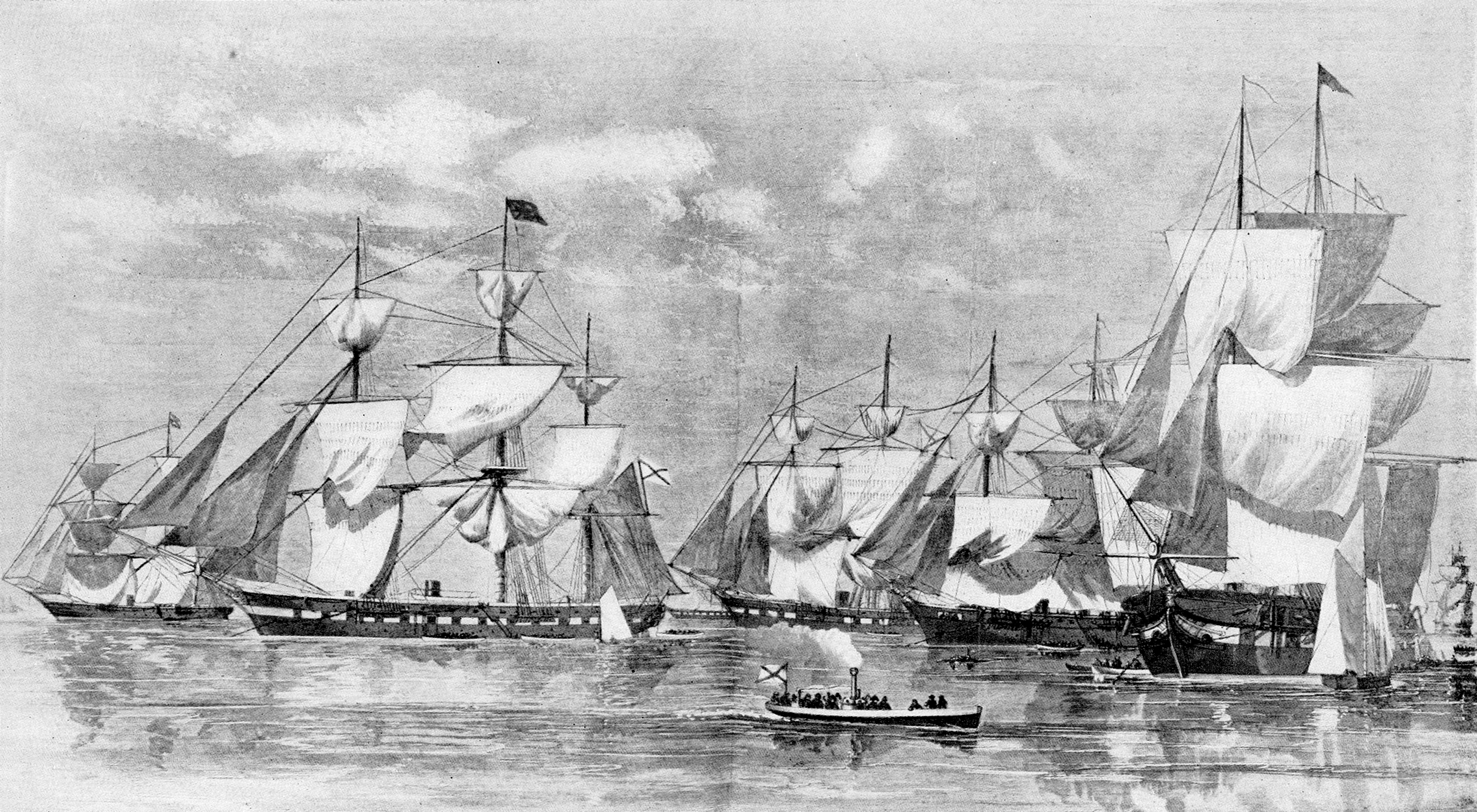
Corvette Vityaz, frigate Alexander Nevsky, frigate Peresvet, corvette Varyag, and frigate Oslyabya at New York

== See also ==
- Expedition of the Russian fleet to the shores of North America (1863–1864)
- Andrei Alexandrovich Popov (admiral)
- Nikolai Krabbe
- Gideon Welles
- Kalevala (corvette)

== Bibliography ==
- Nikolai Rimsky-Korsakov: My Musical Life. [Летопись моей музыкальной жизни – literally, Chronicle of My Musical Life.] Trans. from the 5th rev. Russian ed. by Judah A. Joffe; ed. with an introduction by Carl Van Vechten. London: Ernst Eulenburg Ltd, 1974.
- C. Douglas Kroll: "Friends in Peace and War": The Russian Navy's Landmark Visit to Civil War San Francisco. University of Nebraska Press. Potomac Books 2007.
- М. Кожевников: Операция русского флота в Северной Америке. 1863—1864 гг. [Operation of the Russian Fleet in North America. 1863–1864]. Морской сборник. 2009. No. 10, pp. 69–79.
