= Vityaz =

Vityaz or vitiaz (Russian: витязь 'knight') may refer to:

- Bogatyr, a folk or epic hero in Slavic culture

== Aircraft and spacecraft ==
- Vityaz, callsign of spacecraft Soyuz TM-14
- Paraavis Vityaz, a Russia paramotor for powered paragliding
- Sikorsky Russky Vityaz, an early four-engined aircraft

== Military ==
- Vityaz (MVD), a Russian Spetsnaz (special forces) unit
- Vityaz (ATV), a Russian all-terrain vehicle
- S-350 missile system Vityaz, a Russian surface-to-air missile defense system
- PP-19-01 Vityaz, a Russian 9mm Parabellum submachine-gun

== Sport ==
- FC Vityaz Krymsk, a Russian football club
- FC Vityaz Podolsk, a Russian football club
- HC Vityaz, an ice hockey team in Chekhov, Russia
- HC Vityaz Kharkiv, an ice hockey team in Ukraine
- Vityaz Ice Palace, an ice arena in Podolsk, Russia
- Vityaz Ice Hockey Center, an ice arena in Chekhov, Russia

== Other uses ==
- Vityaz, a Soviet amateur historical and cultural association, precursor of Pamyat
- Machine engineering company 'Vityaz', a tracked amphibious vehicle manufacturer
- Vitiaz Strait, in New Guinea
- Vityaz Trench, an oceanic trench in the Pacific Ocean
- Ngero–Vitiaz languages, a group of languages in Papua New Guinea
- 71-931 Vityaz, a Russian tram car
- Russian ship Vityaz, the name of several ships

== See also ==
- Víťaz, a village in Slovakia
