= Mikhail Rimsky-Korsakov =

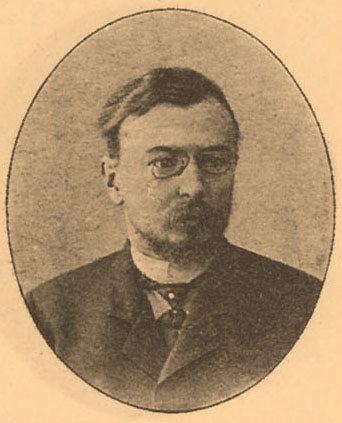
Mikhail Rimsky-Korsakov c. 1900

Mikhail Nikolaevich Rimsky-Korsakov (Russian: Михаил Николаевич Римский-Корсаков 20 August 1873 – 11 March 1951) was a Russian and Soviet zoologist who specialized in entomology at Saint Petersburg University and the Petrograd Forestry Institute. A son of the composer Nikolai Rimsky-Korsakov, he was awarded as an Honored Scientist of the RSFSR (1945).

Rimsky-Korsakov was born in St. Petersburg, the eldest son of the composer Nikolai Andreevich Rimsky-Korsakov. After early education at home, he went to the Karl May Gymnasium and joined Saint Petersburg Imperial University, where he graduated in 1895. He then assisted Vladimir Shevyakov and conducted research on pests. He became an assistant professor of entomology and zoogeography in 1901 and then received a master's degree in zoology in 1913. In 1919 he helped establish the department of entomology and headed it until 1930. He also spent some time lecturing on forest entomology at the Forestry Institute. He published a textbook on Forest Entomology in 1935. He was awarded an Order of Lenin in 1944 and Honored Scientist of the RSFSR in 1945.
