= Víťaz =

- Municipality
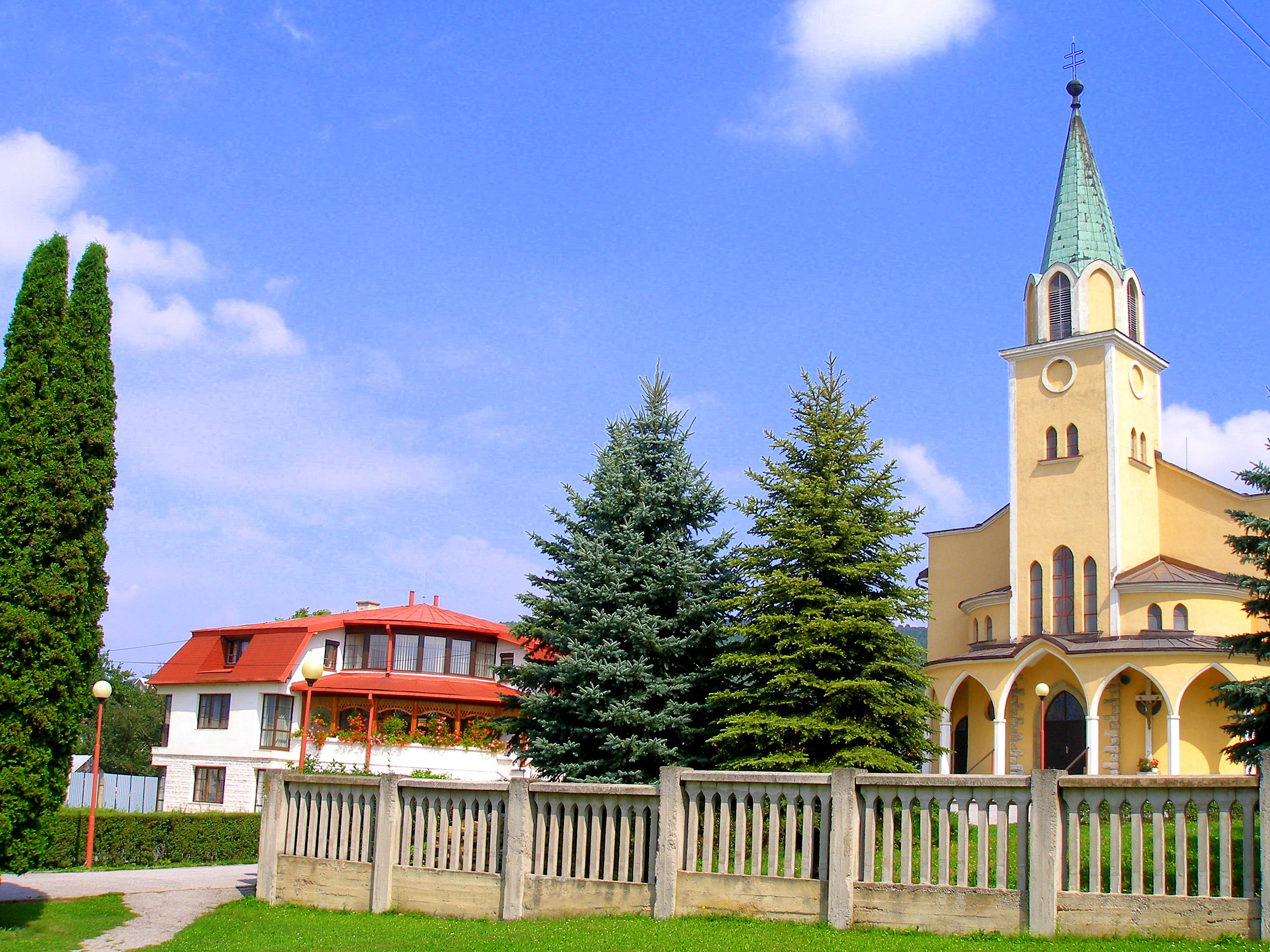

- Flag

- Location of Víťaz in the Prešov Region Location of Víťaz in Slovakia
- Coordinates: 48.97°N 20.95°E
- Country: Slovakia
- Region: Prešov Region
- District: Prešov District
- First mentioned: 1272

Area
  - Total: 19.30 km^{2} (7.45 sq mi)
- Elevation: 474 m (1,555 ft)

Population (2025)
  - Total: 2,043
- Time zone: UTC+1 (CET)
  - Summer (DST): UTC+2 (CEST)
- Postal code: 823 8
- Area code: +421 51
- Vehicle registration plate (until 2022): PO
- Website: www.obecvitaz.sk

Víťaz (Hungarian: Nagyvitéz) is a village and municipality in the Prešov District of the Prešov Region of eastern Slovakia.

== History ==
In historical records the village was first mentioned in 1272.

== Geography ==
The municipality lies at an altitude of 474 metres (1,555 ft) and covers an area of 19.30 km^{2} (7.45 sq mi) (2025).

== Population ==
Population statistic (10 years)
Year	1995	2005	2015	2025
Count	1777	1960	2039	2043
Difference		+10.29%	+4.03%	+0.19%

Population statistic
Year	2024	2025
Count	2040	2043
Difference		+0.14%

It has a population of 2043 people (31 December 2025).

=== Ethnicity ===
Census 2021 (1+ %)
Ethnicity	Number	Fraction
Slovak	1999	99.1%
Romani	163	8.08%
Not found out	26	1.28%
Total	2017	

In year 2021 was 2017 people by ethnicity 1999 as Slovak, 163 as Romani, 26 as Not found out, 3 as Czech, 3 as Rusyn, 1 as German, 1 as Greek and 1 as Albanian.

Note on population: The difference values of population numbers in the table "Population statistic" and in the sections "Ethnicity" & "Religion" is caused by the use of various statistical methods.

=== Religion ===
Census 2021 (1+ %)
Religion	Number	Fraction
Roman Catholic Church	1931	95.74%
None	47	2.33%
Total	2017	

In year 2021 was 2017 people by religion 1931 from Roman Catholic Church, 47 from None, 20 from Not found out, 5 from Old Catholic Church, 4 from Greek Catholic Church, 3 from Christian Congregations in Slovakia, 2 from Other and not ascertained christian church, 2 from Evangelical Church, 1 from Calvinist Church, 1 from Other and 1 from Buddhism.
