= Russian ship Vityaz =

Vityaz is the name of the following ships:

- Russian corvette Vityaz (1862), a steam corvette of the Imperial Russian Navy decommissioned in 1895
- Russian corvette Vityaz (1884), a corvette of the Imperial Russian Navy launched in 1884 and circumnavigated the globe under the command of Stepan Makarov
- Russian cruiser Vityaz, a Bogatyr-class cruiser destroyed by fire during construction in the 1900s
- RV Vityaz (1939), a Soviet research vessel in service 1949–79, now a museum ship
- RV Vityaz (1981), a Russian tanker reportedly used to supply North Korea with petroleum

== See also ==
- Vityaz (disambiguation)
