= Nadezhda Rimskaya-Korsakova =

Russian pianist and composer

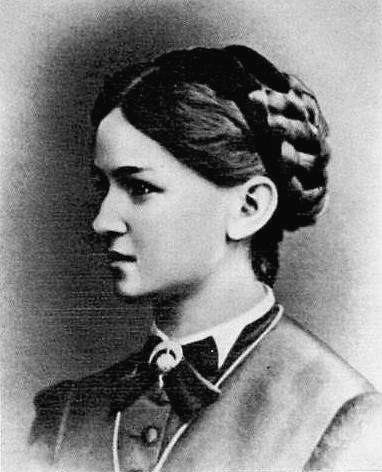
Nadezhda Nikolayevna Rimskaya-Korsakova

Nadezhda Nikolayevna Rimskaya-Korsakova (Russian: Надежда Николаевна Римская-Корсакова, IPA: [nɐˈdʲeʐdə nʲɪkɐˈlajɪvnə ˈrʲimskəjə ˈkorsəkəvə]; née Purgold; 19 October [O.S. 7 October] 1848 – May 24, 1919) was a Russian pianist and composer. Her husband was the composer Nikolai Rimsky-Korsakov.

== Life ==
=== Early years ===
Born Nadezhda Nikolayevna Purgold in St. Petersburg, she was the youngest of three daughters and the great-granddaughter of the 18th century jurist Johann Purgold. She started playing the piano at age nine, continuing her piano studies at the St. Petersburg Conservatory with Anton Gerke. She also studied music theory at the conservatory with Nikolai Zaremba and, later, composition and orchestration with Rimsky-Korsakov but did not graduate. During the 1860s and 1870s, she played piano at musical soirees at the home of Alexander Dargomyzhsky, becoming friends with Dargomyzhsky, Modest Mussorgsky and Alexander Borodin. Mussorgsky, who was fond of both Nadezhda and her sister Alexandra and would become close to both, called Nadezhda "our darling orchestra." She also played at gatherings in her home works of Mily Balakirev and of other members of "The Five."

Among the works she played with the kuchka were Mussorgsky's operas Zhenitba (Marriage) and Boris Godunov, plus Nikolai Rimsky-Korsakov's The Maid of Pskov.

=== Marriage ===
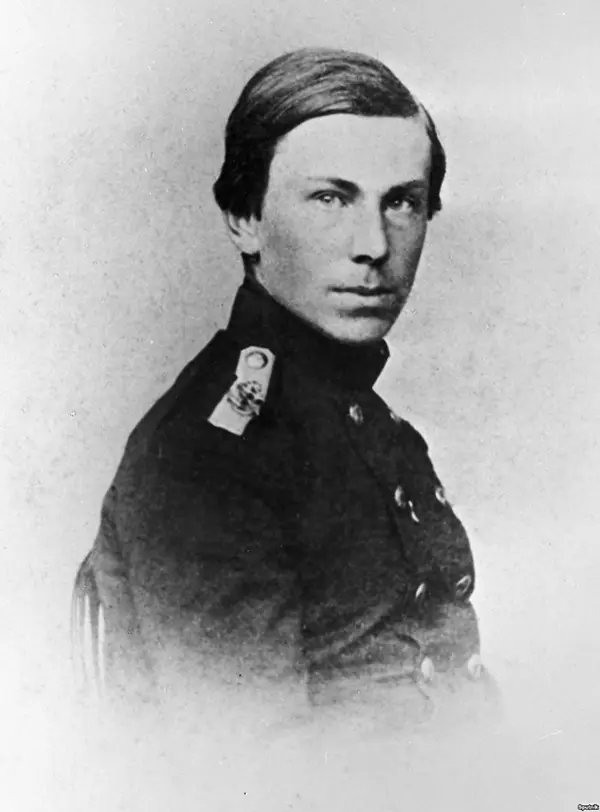
Nikolai Rimsky-Korsakov in his youth

She met Rimsky-Korsakov at Dargomyzhsky's home in the spring of 1868. Not long after their first meeting he wrote a song which he dedicated to her. He also started visiting her frequently, both at the Purgold home in St. Petersburg and at the family's summer residence in Lyesnov. She found in him an abundance of warmth and gentleness. He proposed to her in December 1871, and they married in July 1872. Mussorgsky was Rimsky-Korsakov's best man. The Rimsky-Korsakovs would eventually have seven children. Nadezhda was to become a musical as well as domestic partner with her husband, much as Clara Schumann had been with her own husband Robert. Beautiful, capable, strong-willed and far better trained musically than her husband at the time they married, she proved a good and most demanding critic of his work; her influence over him in musical matters was strong enough for Balakirev and Stasov to wonder sometimes whether she was leading him astray from their musical preferences. Although she gradually gave up composition after her marriage, she had a considerable influence on the creation of his first three operas. She travelled with her husband, attended rehearsals and proofread and arranged compositions by him and others. Years later, Nikolai Rimsky-Korsakov wrote: "The overture [from The Maid of Pskov], from the first note to the last one, belongs to a no-good girl whom I love very, very much."

Her enthusiasm for Nikolai Gogol's work became reflected in both her husband's compositions and those of his friends. On the day of their betrothal, she and Rimsky-Korsakov read Gogol's short story "May Night" together. Afterwards, she told him that he should write an opera based on it. A week or two later she wrote him, I've been reading yet another of Gogol's stories today, "The Fair at Sorochyntsi." This is good, too, and would even be suitable for an opera, but not for you; in any case, it's not like 'May Night.' As for that, it's so stuck in my head that nothing will drive it out. Either she or her sister Alexandra then suggested "The Fair at Sorochyntsi" to Mussorgsky. He did not act on it at the time, but a couple of years later, he reconsidered.

Nadezhda was also very prominent in the Rimsky-Korsakovs' social life, active in gatherings at the Rimsky-Korsakov household as both accompanist and performer. At one of these soirees, Pyotr Ilyich Tchaikovsky played the finale of his Little Russian Symphony. After hearing it, she begged the composer in tears to let her arrange it for piano duet. However, illness intervened and Tchaikovsky made the arrangement himself.

=== Outspokenness ===
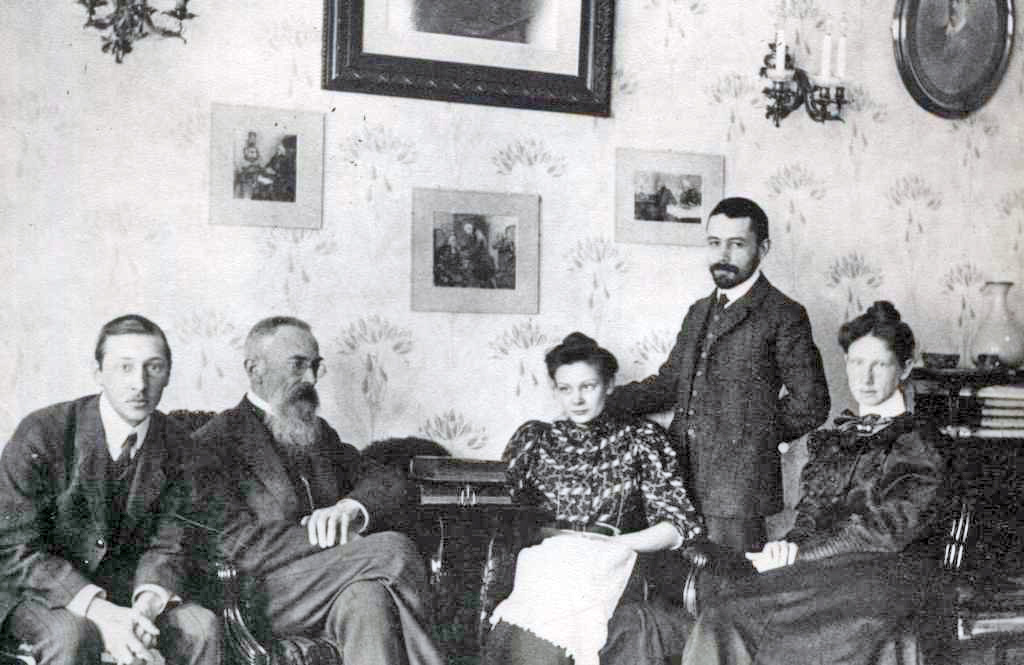
Igor Stravinsky (left) with Rimsky-Korsakov and his daughter Nadezhda, her future husband Maximilian Steinberg, and Stravinsky's first wife Yekaterina, 1908

Like her husband in his later years, Nadezhda's musical tastes became less progressive; she rated her son-in-law Maximilian Steinberg a greater composer than Igor Stravinsky. She could also be noticeably tactless about such matters. Stravinsky later wrote about one such incident that occurred at Rimsky-Korsakov's funeral:

I will remember Rimsky in his coffin as long as memory is. He looked so very beautiful I could not help crying. His widow, seeing me, came up to me and said: 'Why so unhappy? We still have Glazunov.' It was the cruelest remark I have ever heard and I have never hated again as I did in that moment.

This was not the only time she was not afraid to speak her mind. In matters regarding her husband she was fiercely loyal. When Anton Rubinstein reassumed the directorship of the St. Petersburg Conservatory in 1887 and started replacing Russian professors with foreign ones, Stasov was outraged at the thought of Rimsky-Korsakov kowtowing to "the Great Ruler." Stasov told Balakirev that he had written to Rimsky-Korsakov "that their relations with the Conservatory and Rubinstein is Unitarianism (and, on the part of Cui, unadulterated apostasy)...."

When Stasov's letter arrived, Rimsky-Korsakov was hard at work completing Borodin's opera Prince Igor. Nadezhda took it upon herself to answer Stasov:

All your leonine fulminations are inappropriate and even comical... You ought to study the facts before you write about them. What right do you have in suspecting my husband of base acts, apostasy, and the devil only knows what else? To that person who has been telling you slanderous things about him, you write and tell him off. And I hope that Nikolai Andreyevich does not need anyone's advice in order to act in all circumstances of life in a noble and honorable fashion; for this he has sufficient nobility and intellect of his own.

Upon Rimsky-Korsakov's death in 1908, Nadezhda became the executrix of his literary and musical estates. This included the considerable job of editing and publishing his posthumous literary and musical works. These included his autobiography, My Musical Life, collections of articles and notes on music plus a part of his correspondence with friends. She spent the rest of her life preserving his legacy, among other things, protesting Sergei Diaghilev's use of music from Scheherazade and The Golden Cockerel for ballets. She died of smallpox in St. Petersburg (by then renamed Petrograd) at age 70. After her death, her son Andrei continued her efforts, writing a multi-volume study of his father's life and work.

== Music ==
=== Arrangements ===
Dargomyzhsky taught Rimskaya-Korsakova how to reduce orchestral scores, a task for which she was especially talented and adept and which she would put to good use. Her transcriptions (for piano four-hands) include works by Dargomyzhsky, Rimsky-Korsakov, Tchaikovsky, Borodin and Glazunov. She also arranged the vocal scores for Rimsky-Korsakov's The Maid of Pskov and The Noblewoman Vera Sheloga, along with Borodin's Prince Igor in conjunction with Glazunov and her husband.

=== Original works ===
Autograph manuscripts survive of a symphonic tableau after Gogol, "The Enchanted Place" (Zakoldovannoye mesto), an opera Midsummer Night in piano-vocal score, piano pieces and songs. She completed "The Enchanted Place" a week or two before her marriage, orchestrating it the following year. Her composing tailed off rapidly after her marriage to Rimsky-Korsakov. This may have been partly from unfavorable comparison of her works to her husband's, but likely also due to family responsibilities.

== Bibliography ==
She published two recollections of Dargomyzhsky, wrote a memoir of Mussorgsky and edited her husband's autobiography, My Musical Life.

== Sources ==
- Abraham, Gerald (1980). Sadie, Stanley (ed.). The New Grove Dictionary of Music and Musicians, 20 vols. London: Macmillan. ISBN 0-333-23111-2.
- Brown, David (2002). The Master Musicians: Mussorgsky, His Life and Works. Oxford and New York: Oxford University Press. ISBN 0-19-816587-0.
- Brown, David (1978). Tchaikovsky: The Early Years, 1840–1874. New York: W.W. Norton & Company, Inc. ISBN 9780393075359.
- Brown, Malcolm Hamrick (1995). The Norton/Grove Dictionary of Women Composers. New York and London: W.W. Norton & Company. ISBN 0-393-03487-9.
- Calvocoressi, M.D.; Abraham, Gerald (1944). Masters of Russian Music. New York: Tudor Publishing Company. ISBN n/a
- Orlova, Alexandra (1983). Mussorgsky's Days and Works: a Biography in Documents. Bloomington and Indianapolis: UMI Research Press. ISBN 9780835713245.
- Rimsky-Korsakov, Nikolai (1909). Летопись моей музыкальной жизни (Letoppis Moyey Muzykalnoy Zhizni). St. Petersburg: Tipografiya Glazunova. published in English as My Musical Life (New York: Knopf, 1925, 3rd ed. 1942). ISBN n/a.
- Sadie, Stanley, ed. (2001). The New Grove Dictionary of Music and Musicians 29 vols (Second ed.). London: Macmillan. ISBN 1-56159-239-0.
  - Frovola-Walker, Marina et al., "Rimsky Korsakov. Russian family of Musicians. (1) Nikolay Andreyevich Rimsky-Korsakov." in New Grove (2001), Volume 21, pp. 400 ff
  - Neff, Lyle K. et al., "Rimsky Korsakov. Russian family of musicians. (2) Nadezda Rimskaya-Korsakova." in New Grove (2001), Volume 21, pp. 423 ff
