= Andrey Rimsky-Korsakov =

Russian musicologist (1878–1940)

- Born: October 17, 1878
- Died: May 23, 1940 (aged 61)
- Occupation: Musicologist
- Spouse: Yuliya Veysberg
- Parent(s): Nikolai Rimsky-Korsakov and Nadezhda Rimskaya-Korsakova

Andrey Nikolayevich Rimsky-Korsakov (Russian: Андре́й Никола́евич Ри́мский-Ко́рсаков, romanized: Andréy Nikoláyevich Rímskiy-Kórsakov; October 17, 1878 – May 23, 1940) was a musicologist and son of the Russian composers Nikolai Rimsky-Korsakov and Nadezhda Rimskaya-Korsakova. He was encouraged in musical pursuits, playing cello in the family string quartet. However he did not pursue music as a career until late in his life.

== Biography ==
Rimsky-Korsakov studied philosophy at university and went on to teach the subject in gymnasiums until 1912, when he took the position of music correspondent for the Russian paper Russkaya molva. (Despite him being a friend of Igor Stravinsky, among Rimsky-Korsakov's writings for that publication is included a scathing review of The Rite of Spring.) He went on to become the founding editor of the first Russian music magazine, Muzïkal'nïy sovremennik (1915–17), which covered musicological study as well as concerts.

After the demise of Muzïkal'nïy sovremennik, Rimsky-Korsakov headed the music department of the Leningrad Saltïkov-Shchedrin Public Library (though he contributed to three issues of the magazine's successor, which began publication in 1922) and taught music theory and music history at Leningrad University as well as the Institute of Historical Studies. Many of Rimsky-Korsakov's more notable efforts were on behalf of his father's work, including the authorship of a five-volume study of his life and work and the establishing of a museum for the late composer. He was married to the composer Yuliya Veysberg.
