= Nikolai Rimsky-Korsakov =

Russian composer (1844–1908)

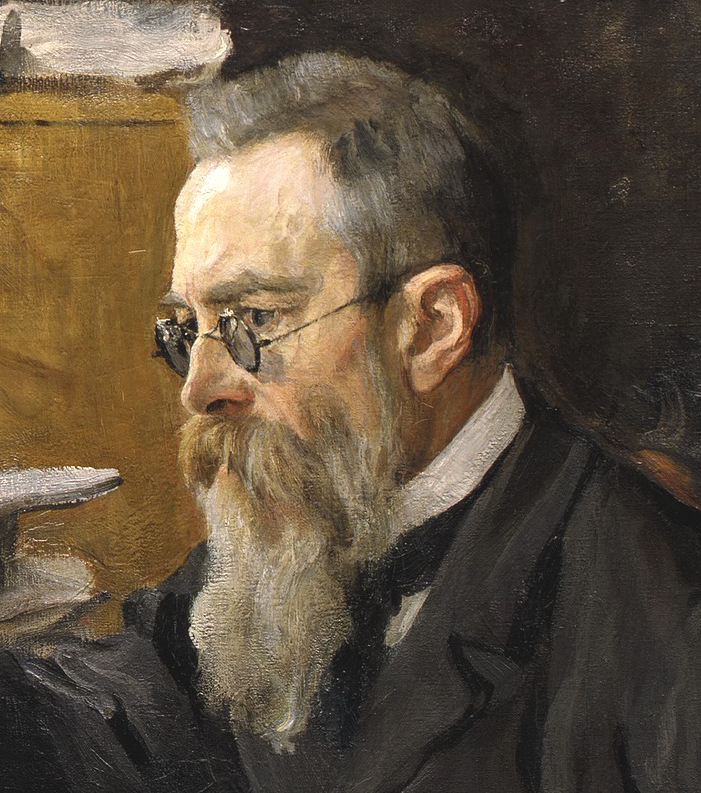
- 1898 portrait
- Born: 18 March 1844; Tikhvin, Russia
- Died: 21 June 1908 (aged 64); Luga, Russia
- Works: List of compositions
- Spouse: Nadezhda Rimskaya-Korsakova
- Children: 3, including Andrey
- Relatives: Voin Rimsky-Korsakov (brother)

Signature
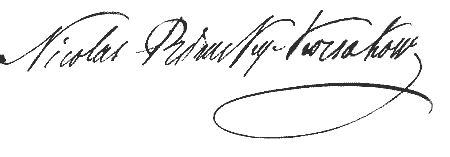

Nikolai Andreyevich Rimsky-Korsakov (Note: In this name that follows East Slavic naming customs, the patronymic is Andreyevich and the family name is Rimsky-Korsakov.) (Note: Russian: Николай Андреевич Римский-Корсаков, romanized: Nikolay Andreyevich Rimskiy-Korsakov, IPA: [nʲɪkəˈlaj ɐnˈdrʲejɪvʲɪtɕ ˈrʲimskʲɪj ˈkorsəkəf]. At the time, his name was spelled Николай Андреевичъ Римскій-Корсаковъ, which he romanized as Nicolas Rimsky-Korsakow; the BGN/PCGN transliteration of Russian is used for his name here; ALA-LC system: Nikolaĭ Andrevich Rimskiĭ-Korsakov, ISO 9 system: Nikolaj Andreevič Rimskij-Korsakov. Latin: Nicolaus Andreae filius Rimskij-Korsakov.) (18 March 1844 – 21 June 1908) (Note: Russia was still using old style dates in the 19th century, rendering his lifespan as 6 March 1844 – 8 June 1908. Some sources in the article report dates as old style rather than new style.) was a Russian composer, a member of the group of composers known as The Five. (Note: The Five, also known as The Mighty Handful or The Mighty Coterie, refers to a circle of composers who met in Saint Petersburg, Russia, between 1856 and 1870: Mily Balakirev (the leader), César Cui, Modest Mussorgsky, Nikolai Rimsky-Korsakov, and Alexander Borodin.) His best-known orchestral compositions—Capriccio Espagnol, the Russian Easter Festival Overture, and the symphonic suite Scheherazade—are staples of the classical music repertoire, along with suites and excerpts from some of his fifteen operas. Scheherazade is an example of his frequent use of fairy-tale and folk subjects. He was the husband of the composer Nadezhda Rimskaya-Korsakova.

Rimsky-Korsakov believed in developing a nationalistic style of classical music, employing Russian folk song and lore along with exotic harmonic, melodic and rhythmic elements in a practice known as musical orientalism, and eschewing traditional Western compositional methods. Rimsky-Korsakov appreciated Western musical techniques after he became a professor of musical composition, harmony, and orchestration at the Saint Petersburg Conservatory in 1871. He undertook a rigorous three-year program of self-education and became a master of Western methods, incorporating them alongside the influences of Mikhail Glinka and fellow members of The Five. Rimsky-Korsakov's techniques of composition and orchestration were further enriched by his exposure to the works of Richard Wagner.

For much of his life, Rimsky-Korsakov combined his composition and teaching with a career in the Russian armed forces—first as an officer in the Imperial Russian Navy, then as the civilian Inspector of Naval Bands. He wrote that he developed a passion for the ocean in childhood from reading books and hearing of his older brother's exploits in the navy. This love of the sea may have influenced him to write two of his best-known orchestral works, the musical tableau Sadko (not to be confused with his later opera of the same name) and Scheherazade. As Inspector of Naval Bands, Rimsky-Korsakov expanded his knowledge of woodwind and brass playing, which enhanced his abilities in orchestration. He passed this knowledge to his students, and also posthumously through a textbook on orchestration that was completed by his son-in-law Maximilian Steinberg.

Rimsky-Korsakov left a considerable body of original Russian nationalist compositions. He prepared works by The Five for performance, which brought them into the active classical repertoire (although there is controversy over his editing of the works of Modest Mussorgsky), and shaped a generation of younger composers and musicians during his decades as an educator. Rimsky-Korsakov is therefore considered "the main architect" of what the classical-music public considers the "Russian style". His influence on younger composers was especially important, as he served as a transitional figure between the autodidactism exemplified by Glinka and The Five, and professionally trained composers, who became the norm in Russia by the closing years of the 19th century. While Rimsky-Korsakov's style was based on those of Glinka, Balakirev, Hector Berlioz, Franz Liszt and, for a brief period, Wagner, he "transmitted this style directly to two generations of Russian composers" and influenced non-Russian composers including Maurice Ravel, Claude Debussy, Paul Dukas, and Ottorino Respighi.

== Biography ==
=== Early years ===
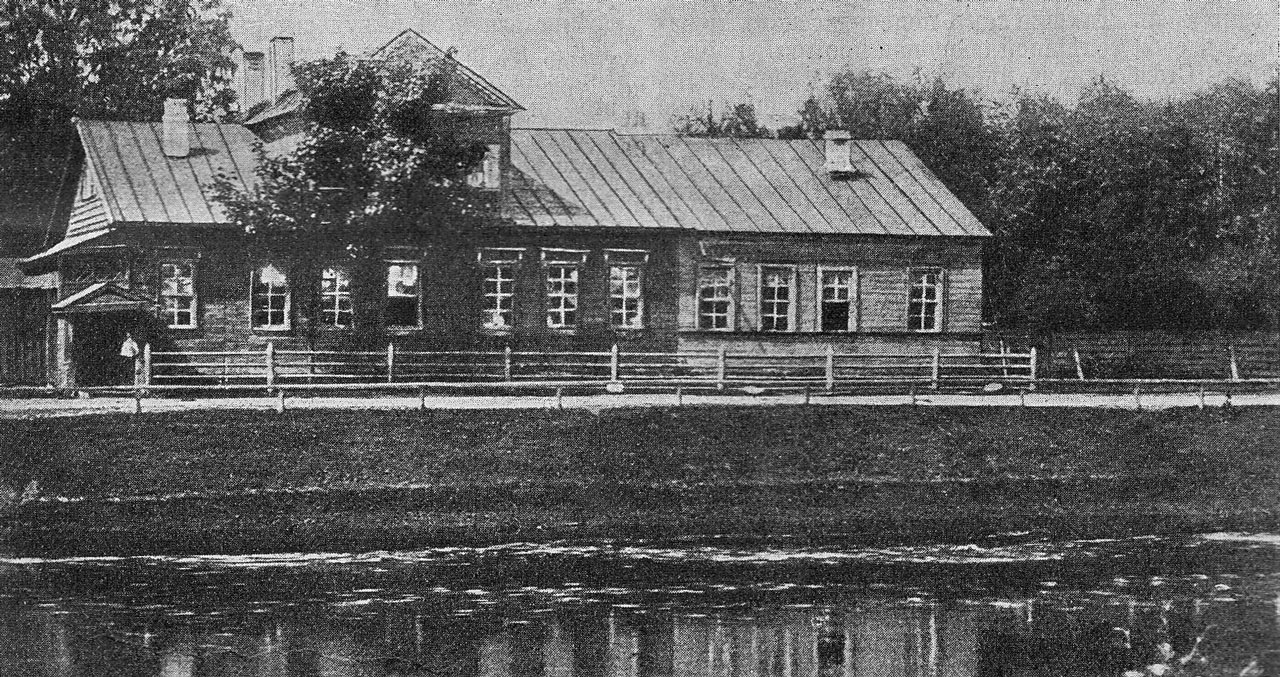
Rimsky-Korsakov's birthplace in Tikhvin

Rimsky-Korsakov was born in Tikhvin, 200 kilometers (120 miles) east of Saint Petersburg, into a Russian noble family. Tikhvin was a town of Novgorod Governorate at that time.

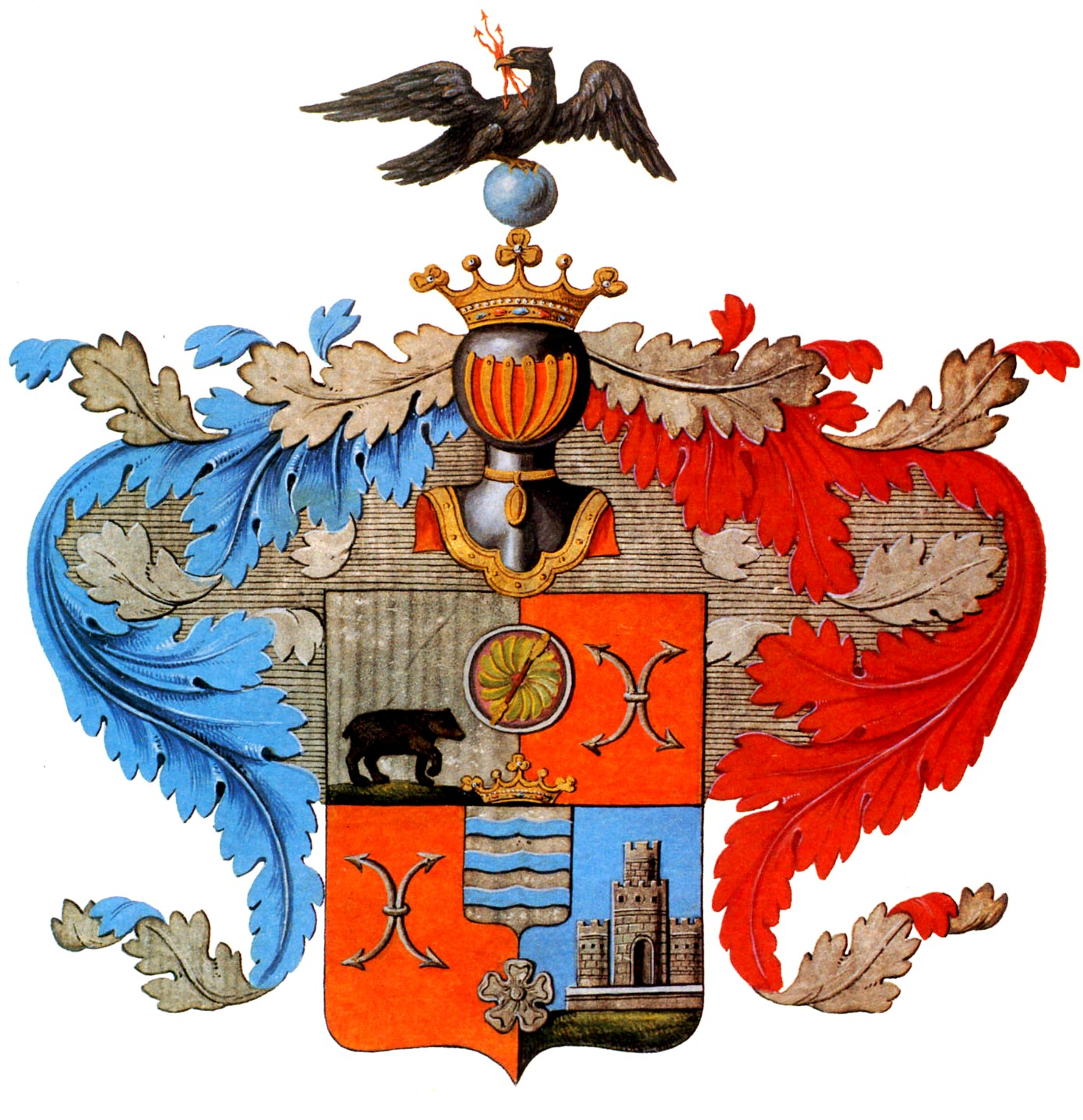
Rimsky-Korsakov family coat of arms

Throughout history, members of the family served in Russian government and took various positions as governors and war generals. Ivan Rimsky-Korsakov was famously a lover of Catherine the Great. By a Tsar's decree on 15 May 1677, 18 representatives of the Korsakov family acquired the right to be called the Rimsky-Korsakov family (the Russian adjective 'Rimsky' means 'Roman') since the family "had a beginning within the Roman borders", i.e. Czech lands, which used to be a part of the Holy Roman Empire. In 1390, Wenceslaus Korsak moved to the Grand Prince Vasily I of Moscow from the Duchy of Lithuania.

The father of the composer, Andrei Petrovich Rimsky-Korsakov, was one of the six illegitimate sons of Avdotya Yakovlevna, daughter of an Orthodox priest from Pskov, and lieutenant general Peter Voinovich Rimsky-Korsakov, who had to officially adopt his own children as he was unable to marry their mother because of her lower social status. Using his friendship with Aleksey Arakcheyev, he granted them all the privileges of the noble family. Andrei went on to serve in the Interior Ministry of the Russian Empire, as vice-governor of Novgorod, and in the Volhynian Governorate. The composer's mother, Sofya Vasilievna Rimskaya-Korsakova, was also born as an illegitimate daughter of a peasant serf and Vasily Fedorovich Skaryatin, a wealthy landlord who belonged to a noble Russian family. Her father raised her in full comfort, yet under an improvised surname, Vasilieva, and with no legal status. By the time Andrei Petrovich met her, he was already a widower: his first wife, knyazna Ekaterina Meshcherskaya, died just nine months after their marriage. Since Skaryatin found him unsuitable for his daughter, Andrei secretly "stole" his bride from the father's house and brought her to Saint Petersburg, where they married.

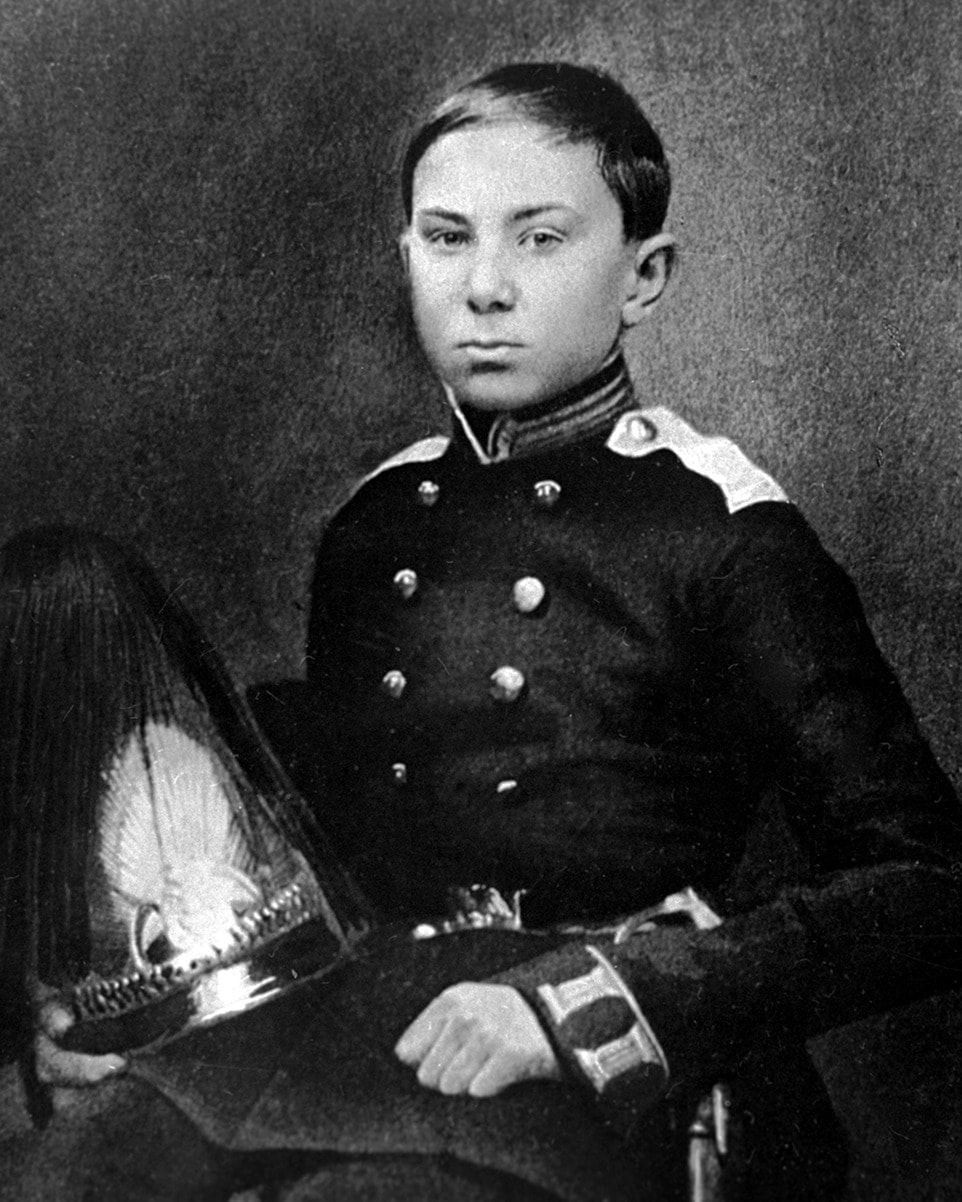
Nikolai Rimsky-Korsakov in 1856

The Rimsky-Korsakov family had a long line of military and naval service. Nikolai's older brother Voin, 22 years his senior, became a well-known navigator and explorer and had a powerful influence on Nikolai's life. He later recalled that his mother played the piano a little, and his father could play a few songs on the piano by ear. Beginning at six, he took piano lessons from local teachers and showed a talent for aural skills, but he showed a lack of interest, playing, as he later wrote, "badly, carelessly, ... poor at keeping time".

Although he started composing by age 10, Rimsky-Korsakov preferred literature to music. He later wrote that from his reading, and tales of his brother's exploits, he developed a poetic love for the sea "without ever having seen it". This love, with subtle prompting from Voin, encouraged the 12-year-old to join the Imperial Russian Navy. He studied at the School for Mathematical and Navigational Sciences in Saint Petersburg and at 18 took his final examination in April 1862.

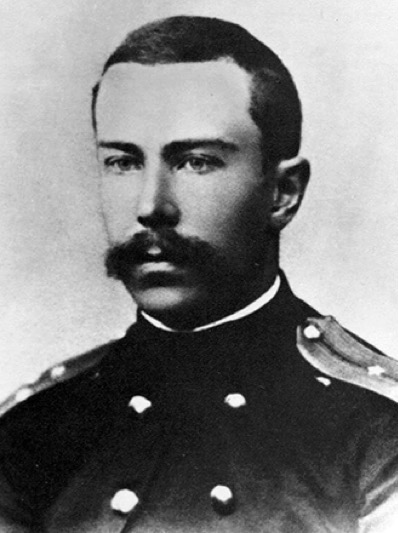
Rimsky-Korsakov in 1866, when he was a michman in the Russian Navy

While at school, Rimsky-Korsakov took piano lessons from a man named Ulikh. Voin, now director of the school, sanctioned these lessons because he hoped they would help Nikolai develop social skills and overcome his shyness. Rimsky-Korsakov wrote that, while "indifferent" to lessons, he developed a love for music, fostered by visits to the opera and, later, orchestral concerts.

Ulikh perceived Rimsky-Korsakov's musical talent and recommended another teacher, Feodor A. Kanille (Théodore Canillé). Beginning in late 1859, Rimsky-Korsakov took lessons in piano and composition from Kanille, whom he later credited as the inspiration for devoting his life to composition. Through Kanille, he was exposed to a great deal of new music, including Mikhail Glinka and Robert Schumann. Voin cancelled his brother Nikolai's musical lessons when the latter reached age 17, feeling they no longer served a practical purpose.

Kanille told Rimsky-Korsakov to continue coming to him every Sunday, not for formal lessons but to play duets and discuss music. In November 1861, Kanille introduced the 18-year-old Nikolai to Mily Balakirev. Balakirev in turn introduced him to César Cui and Modest Mussorgsky; all three were known as composers, despite only being in their 20s. Rimsky-Korsakov later wrote, "With what delight I listened to real business discussions [Rimsky-Korsakov's emphasis] of instrumentation, part writing, etc! And besides, how much talking there was about current musical matters! All at once I had been plunged into a new world, unknown to me, formerly only heard of in the society of my dilettante friends. That was truly a strong impression."

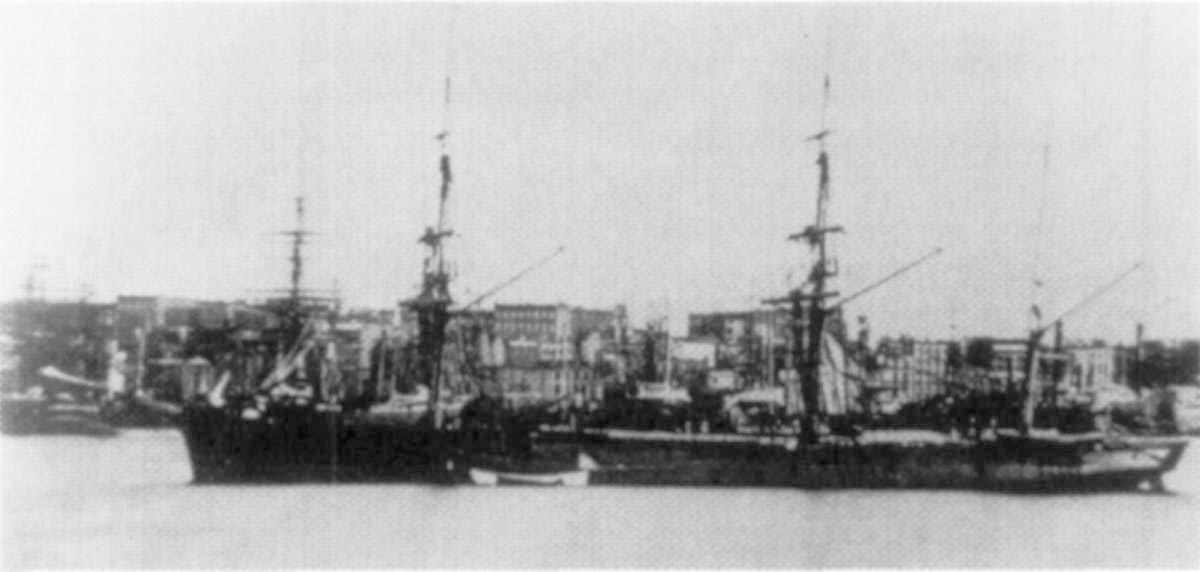
The Russian military clipper Almaz in New York Harbor in 1863. Rimsky-Korsakov served as a midshipman on this ship and later wrote about this cruise.

Balakirev encouraged Rimsky-Korsakov to compose and taught him the rudiments when he was not at sea. Balakirev prompted him to enrich himself in history, literature and criticism. When he showed Balakirev the beginning of a symphony in E♭ minor that he had written, Balakirev insisted he continue working on it despite his lack of formal musical training.

By the time Rimsky-Korsakov sailed on a two-year-and-eight-month cruise aboard the clipper Almaz in late 1862, he had completed and orchestrated three movements of the symphony. (Note: This is not the first symphony by a Russian: Anton Rubinstein composed his first symphony in 1850 (Figes, 391).) He composed the slow movement during a stop in England and mailed the score to Balakirev before going back to sea.

At first, his work on the symphony kept Rimsky-Korsakov occupied during his cruise. He purchased scores at every port of call, along with a piano on which to play them, and filled his idle hours studying Berlioz's Treatise on Instrumentation. He found time to read the works of Homer, William Shakespeare, Friedrich Schiller and Johann Wolfgang von Goethe; he saw London, Niagara Falls, and Rio de Janeiro during his stops in port. Eventually, the lack of outside musical stimuli dulled the young midshipman's hunger to learn. He wrote to Balakirev that after two years at sea he had neglected his musical lessons for months.

"Thoughts of becoming a musician and composer gradually left me altogether", he later recalled; "distant lands began to allure me, somehow, although, properly speaking, naval service never pleased me much and hardly suited my character at all."

=== Mentored by Balakirev; time with The Five ===
Once back in Saint Petersburg in May 1865, Rimsky-Korsakov's onshore duties consisted of a couple of hours of clerical duty each day, but he recalled that his desire to compose "had been stifled ... I did not concern myself with music at all." He wrote that contact with Balakirev in September 1865 encouraged him "to get accustomed to music and later to plunge into it". At Balakirev's suggestion, he wrote a trio to the scherzo of the E♭ minor symphony, which it had lacked up to that point, and reorchestrated the entire symphony. Its first performance came in December of that year under Balakirev's direction in Saint Petersburg. A second performance followed in March 1866 under the direction of Konstantin Lyadov (father of composer Anatoly Lyadov).

Correspondence between Rimsky-Korsakov and Balakirev clearly shows that some ideas for the symphony originated with Balakirev, who seldom stopped at merely correcting a piece of music, and would often recompose it at the piano. Rimsky-Korsakov recalled,

A pupil like myself had to submit to Balakirev a proposed composition in its embryo, say, even the first four or eight bars. Balakirev would immediately make corrections, indicating how to recast such an embryo; he would criticize it, would praise and extol the first two bars, but would censure the next two, ridicule them, and try hard to make the author disgusted with them. Vivacity of composition and fertility were not at all in favor, frequent recasting was demanded, and the composition was extended over a long period of time under the cold control of self-criticism.

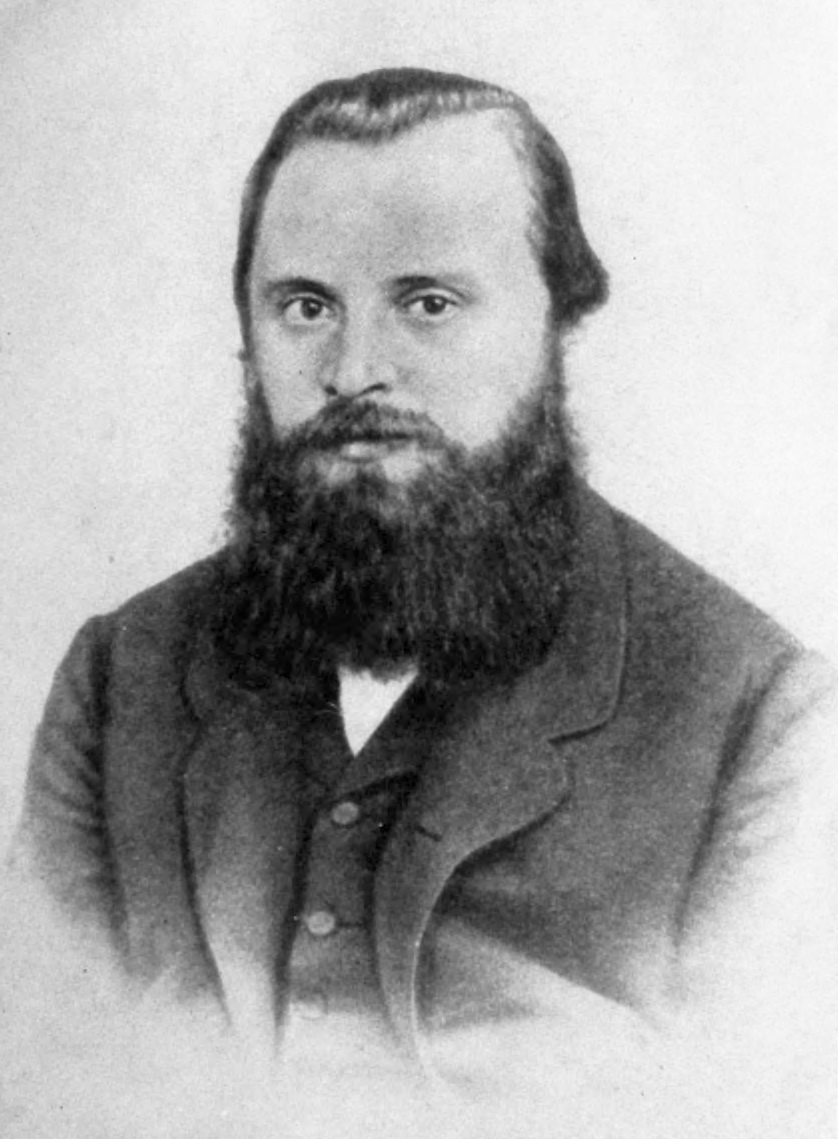
Mily Balakirev encouraged Rimsky-Korsakov to continue composing.

Rimsky-Korsakov recalled that "Balakirev had no difficulty in getting along with me. At his suggestion I most readily rewrote the symphonic movements composed by me and brought them to completion with the help of his advice and improvisations". Though Rimsky-Korsakov later found Balakirev's influence stifling, and broke free from it, this did not stop him in his memoirs from extolling the older composer's talents as a critic and improviser. Under Balakirev's mentoring, Rimsky-Korsakov turned to other compositions. He began a symphony in B minor, but felt it too closely followed Beethoven's Ninth Symphony and abandoned it. He completed an Overture on Three Russian Themes, based on Balakirev's folksong overtures, as well as a Fantasia on Serbian Themes that was performed at a concert given for the delegates of the Slavonic Congress in 1867. In his review of this concert, nationalist critic Vladimir Stasov coined the phrase Moguchaya kuchka for the Balakirev circle (Moguchaya kuchka is usually translated as "The Mighty Handful" or "The Five"). Rimsky-Korsakov also composed the initial versions of Sadko and Antar, which cemented his reputation as a writer of orchestral works.

Rimsky-Korsakov socialized and discussed music with the other members of The Five; they critiqued one another's works in progress and collaborated on new pieces. He became friends with Alexander Borodin, whose music "astonished" him. He spent an increasing amount of time with Mussorgsky. Balakirev and Mussorgsky played piano four-hand music, Mussorgsky would sing, and they frequently discussed other composers' works, with preferred tastes running "toward Glinka, Schumann and Beethoven's late quartets". Mendelssohn was not thought of highly, Mozart and Haydn "were considered out of date and naïve", and J.S. Bach merely mathematical and unfeeling. Berlioz "was highly esteemed", Liszt "crippled and perverted from a musical point of view ... even a caricature", and Wagner discussed little. Rimsky-Korsakov "listened to these opinions with avidity and absorbed the tastes of Balakirev, Cui and Mussorgsky without reasoning or examination". Often, the musical works in question "were played before me only in fragments, and I had no idea of the whole work". This, he wrote, did not stop him from accepting these judgments at face value and repeating them "as if I were thoroughly convinced of their truth".

Rimsky-Korsakov became especially appreciated within The Five, and among those who visited the circle, for his talents as an orchestrator. He was asked by Balakirev to orchestrate a Schubert march for a concert in May 1868, by Cui to orchestrate the opening chorus of his opera William Ratcliff and by Alexander Dargomyzhsky, whose works were greatly appreciated by The Five and who was close to death, to orchestrate his opera The Stone Guest.

In late 1871, Rimsky-Korsakov moved into Voin's former apartment, and invited Mussorgsky to be his roommate. The working arrangement they agreed upon was that Mussorgsky used the piano in the mornings while Rimsky-Korsakov worked on copying or orchestration. When Mussorgsky left for his civil service job at noon, Rimsky-Korsakov then used the piano. Time in the evenings was allotted by mutual agreement. "That autumn and winter the two of us accomplished a good deal", Rimsky-Korsakov wrote, "with constant exchange of ideas and plans. Mussorgsky composed and orchestrated the Polish act of Boris Godunov and the folk scene 'Near Kromy.' I orchestrated and finished my Maid of Pskov."

=== Professorship, marriage, inspector of bands ===
In 1871, the 27-year-old Rimsky-Korsakov became Professor of Practical Composition and Instrumentation (orchestration) at the Saint Petersburg Conservatory, as well as leader of the Orchestra Class. He retained his position in active naval service, and taught his classes in uniform (military officers in Russia were required to wear their uniforms every day, as they were considered to be always on duty).

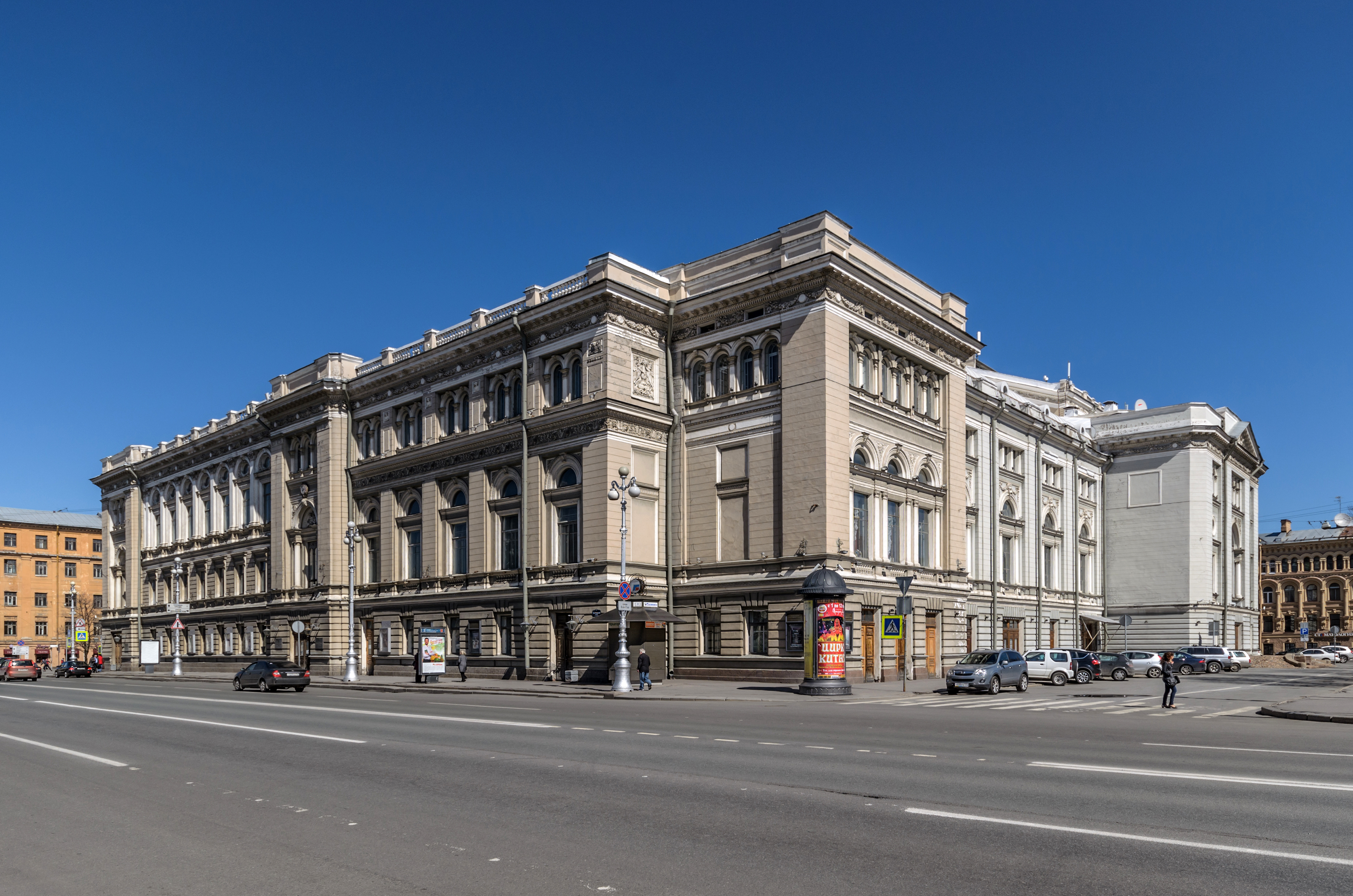
Saint Petersburg Conservatory, where Rimsky-Korsakov taught from 1871 to 1906

Rimsky-Korsakov explained in his memoirs that Mikhaíl Azanchevsky had taken over that year as director of the Conservatory, and wanting new blood to freshen up teaching in those subjects, had offered to pay generously for Rimsky-Korsakov's services. Biographer Mikhail Tsetlin (aka Mikhail Zetlin) suggests that Azanchevsky's motives might have been twofold.

First, Rimsky-Korsakov was the member of the Five least criticized by its opponents, and inviting him to teach at the Conservatory may have been considered a safe way to show that all serious musicians were welcome there.

Second, the offer may have been calculated to expose him to an academic climate in which he would write in a more conservative, Western-based style. Balakirev had opposed academic training in music with tremendous vigor, but encouraged him to accept the post to convince others to join the nationalist musical cause.

Rimsky-Korsakov's reputation at this time was as a master of orchestration, based on Sadko and Antar. He had written these works mainly by intuition. His knowledge of musical theory was elemental; he had never written any counterpoint, could not harmonize a simple chorale, nor knew the names or intervals of musical chords. He had never conducted an orchestra, and had been discouraged from doing so by the navy, which did not approve of his appearing on the podium in uniform. Aware of his technical shortcomings, Rimsky-Korsakov consulted Pyotr Ilyich Tchaikovsky, with whom he and the others in The Five had been in occasional contact. Tchaikovsky, unlike The Five, had received academic training in composition at the Saint Petersburg Conservatory, and was serving as Professor of Music Theory at the Moscow Conservatory. Tchaikovsky advised him to study.

Rimsky-Korsakov wrote that while teaching at the Conservatory he soon became "possibly its very best pupil [Rimsky-Korsakov's emphasis], judging by the quantity and value of the information it gave me!" To prepare himself, and to stay at least one step ahead of his students, he took a three-year sabbatical from composing original works, and assiduously studied at home while he lectured at the Conservatory. He taught himself from textbooks, and followed a strict regimen of composing contrapuntal exercises, fugues, chorales and a cappella choruses.

Rimsky-Korsakov eventually became an excellent teacher and a fervent believer in academic training. He revised everything he had composed prior to 1874, even acclaimed works such as Sadko and Antar, in a search for perfection that would remain with him throughout the rest of his life. Assigned to rehearse the Orchestra Class, he mastered the art of conducting. Dealing with orchestral textures as a conductor, and making suitable arrangements of musical works for the Orchestra Class, led to an increased interest in the art of orchestration, an area into which he would further indulge his studies as Inspector of Navy Bands. The score of his Third Symphony, written just after he had completed his three-year program of self-improvement, reflects his hands-on experience with the orchestra.

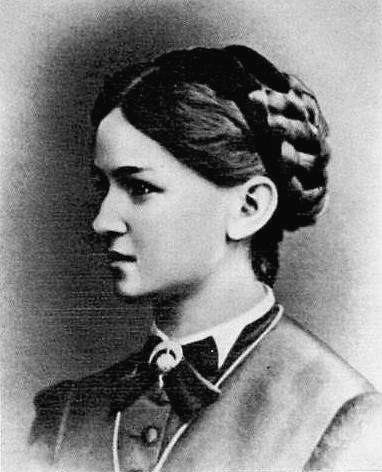
Nadezhda Rimskaya-Korsakova, née Purgold, wife of the composer

Professorship brought Rimsky-Korsakov financial security, which encouraged him to settle down and to start a family. In December 1871 he proposed to Nadezhda Purgold, with whom he had developed a close relationship over weekly gatherings of The Five at the Purgold household. They married in July 1872, with Mussorgsky serving as best man. The Rimsky-Korsakovs had seven children. Their first son, Mikhail, became an entomologist while another son, Andrei, became a musicologist, married the composer Yuliya Veysberg and wrote a multi-volume study of his father's life and work.

Nadezhda became a musical as well as domestic partner with her husband, much as Clara Schumann had been with her own husband Robert. She was beautiful, capable, strong-willed, and far better trained musically than her husband at the time they married—she had attended the Saint Petersburg Conservatory in the mid-1860s, studying piano with Anton Gerke (one of whose private students was Mussorgsky) and music theory with Nikolai Zaremba, who also taught Tchaikovsky. Nadezhda proved a fine and most demanding critic of her husband's work; her influence over him in musical matters was strong enough for Balakirev and Stasov to wonder whether she was leading him astray from their musical preferences. Musicologist Lyle Neff wrote that while Nadezhda gave up her own compositional career when she married Rimsky-Korsakov, she "had a considerable influence on the creation of [Rimsky-Korsakov's] first three operas. She travelled with her husband, attended rehearsals and arranged compositions by him and others" for piano four hands, which she played with her husband. "Her last years were dedicated to issuing her husband's posthumous literary and musical legacy, maintaining standards for performance of his works ... and preparing material for a museum in his name."

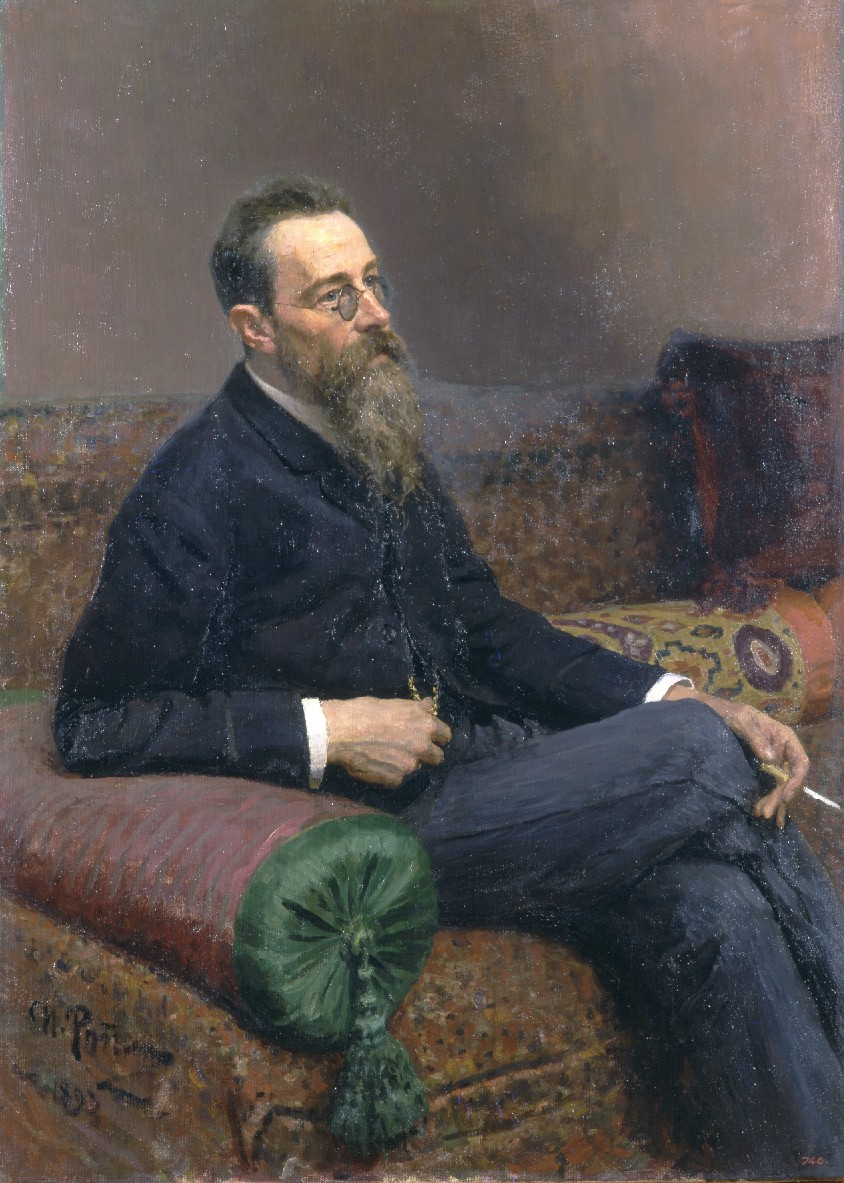
Portrait of Rimsky-Korsakov by Ilya Repin

In early 1873, the navy created the civilian post of Inspector of Naval Bands, with a rank of Collegiate Assessor, and appointed Rimsky-Korsakov. This kept him on the navy payroll and listed on the roster of the Chancellery of the Navy Department but allowed him to resign his commission. The composer commented, "I parted with delight with both my military status and my officer's uniform", he later wrote. "Henceforth I was a musician officially and incontestably." As Inspector, Rimsky-Korsakov applied himself with zeal to his duties. He visited naval bands throughout Russia, supervised the bandmasters and their appointments, reviewed the bands' repertoire, and inspected the quality of their instruments. He wrote a study program for a complement of music students who held navy fellowships at the Conservatory, and acted as an intermediary between the Conservatory and the navy. He also indulged in a long-standing desire to familiarize himself with the construction and playing technique of orchestral instruments. These studies prompted him to write a textbook on orchestration. He used the privileges of rank to exercise and expand upon his knowledge. He discussed arrangements of musical works for military band with bandmasters, encouraged and reviewed their efforts, held concerts at which he could hear these pieces, and orchestrated original works, and works by other composers, for military bands.

In March 1884, an Imperial Order abolished the navy office of Inspector of Bands, and Rimsky-Korsakov was relieved of his duties. He worked under Balakirev in the Court Chapel as a deputy until 1894, which allowed him to study Russian Orthodox church music. He also taught classes at the chapel, and wrote his textbook on harmony for use there and at the Conservatory.

=== Backlash and May Night ===
Rimsky-Korsakov's studies and his change in attitude regarding music education brought him the scorn of his fellow nationalists, who thought he was throwing away his Russian heritage to compose fugues and sonatas. After he strove "to crowd in as much counterpoint as possible" into his Third Symphony, he wrote chamber works adhering strictly to classical models, including a string sextet, a string quartet in F major (Op. 12) and a quintet for flute, clarinet, horn, bassoon and piano in B♭. About the quartet and the symphony, Tchaikovsky wrote to his patroness, Nadezhda von Meck, that they "were filled with a host of clever things but ... [were] imbued with a dryly pedantic character". Borodin commented that when he heard the symphony, he kept "feeling that this is the work of a German Herr Professor who has put on his glasses and is about to write Eine grosse Symphonie in C".

According to Rimsky-Korsakov, the other members of the Five showed little enthusiasm for the symphony, and less still for the quartet. Nor was his public debut as a conductor, at an 1874 charity concert where he led the orchestra in the new symphony, considered favorably by his compatriots. He later wrote that "they began, indeed, to look down upon me as one on the downward path". Worse still to Rimsky-Korsakov was the faint praise given by Anton Rubinstein, a composer opposed to the nationalists' music and philosophy. Rimsky-Korsakov wrote that after Rubinstein heard the quartet, he commented that now Rimsky-Korsakov "might amount to something" as a composer. He wrote that Tchaikovsky continued to support him morally, telling him that he fully applauded what Rimsky-Korsakov was doing and admired both his artistic modesty and his strength of character. Privately, Tchaikovsky confided to Nadezhda von Meck, "Apparently [Rimsky-Korsakov] is now passing through this crisis, and how it will end will be difficult to predict. Either a great master will come out of him, or he will finally become bogged down in contrapuntal tricks".

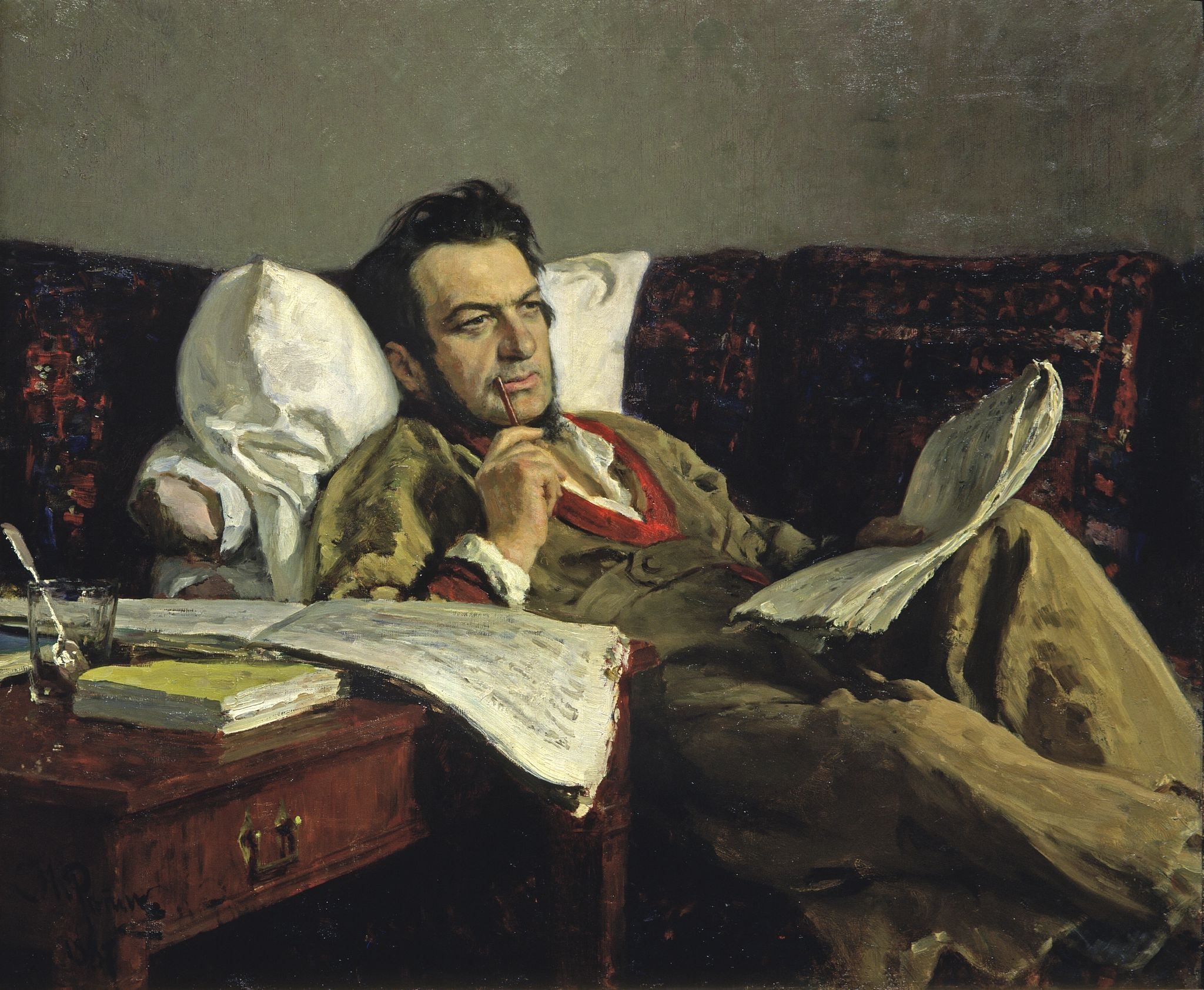
Portrait of Mikhail Glinka by Ilya Repin. Rimsky-Korsakov credited his editing of Glinka's scores with leading him back toward modern music.

Two projects helped Rimsky-Korsakov focus on less academic music-making. The first was the creation of two folk song collections in 1874. Rimsky-Korsakov transcribed 40 Russian songs for voice and piano from performances by folk singer Tvorty Filippov, who approached him at Balakirev's suggestion. This collection was followed by a second containing 100 songs, supplied by friends and servants, or taken from rare and out-of-print collections. Rimsky-Korsakov later credited this work as a great influence on him as a composer; it also supplied a vast amount of musical material from which he could draw for future projects, either by direct quotation or as models for composing fakeloric passages. The second project was the editing of orchestral scores by pioneer Russian composer Mikhail Glinka (1804–1857) in collaboration with Balakirev and Anatoly Lyadov. Glinka's sister, Lyudmila Ivanovna Shestakova, wanted to preserve her brother's musical legacy in print, and paid the costs of the project from her own pocket. No similar project had been attempted before in Russian music, and guidelines for scholarly musical editing had to be established and agreed. While Balakirev favored making changes in Glinka's music to "correct" what he saw as compositional flaws, Rimsky-Korsakov favored a less intrusive approach. Eventually, Rimsky-Korsakov prevailed. "Work on Glinka's scores was an unexpected schooling for me", he later wrote. "Even before this I had known and worshipped his operas; but as editor of the scores in print I had to go through Glinka's style and instrumentation to their last little note ... And this was a beneficent discipline for me, leading me as it did to the path of modern music, after my vicissitudes with counterpoint and strict style".

In mid-1877, Rimsky-Korsakov thought increasingly about the short story May Night by Nikolai Gogol. The story had long been a favorite of his, and his wife Nadezhda had encouraged him to write an opera based on it from the day of their betrothal, when they had read it together. While musical ideas for such a work predated 1877, now they came with greater persistence. By early 1878 the project took an increasing amount of his attention; in February he started writing in earnest, and he finished the opera by early November.

Rimsky-Korsakov wrote that May Night was of great importance because, despite the opera's containing a good deal of contrapuntal music, he nevertheless "cast off the shackles of counterpoint [emphasis Rimsky-Korsakov]". He wrote the opera in a folk-like melodic idiom, and scored it in a transparent manner much in the style of Glinka. Nevertheless, despite the ease of writing this opera and the next, The Snow Maiden, from time to time he suffered from creative paralysis between 1881 and 1888. He kept busy during this time by editing Mussorgsky's works and completing Borodin's Prince Igor (Mussorgsky died in 1881, Borodin in 1887).

=== Belyayev circle ===
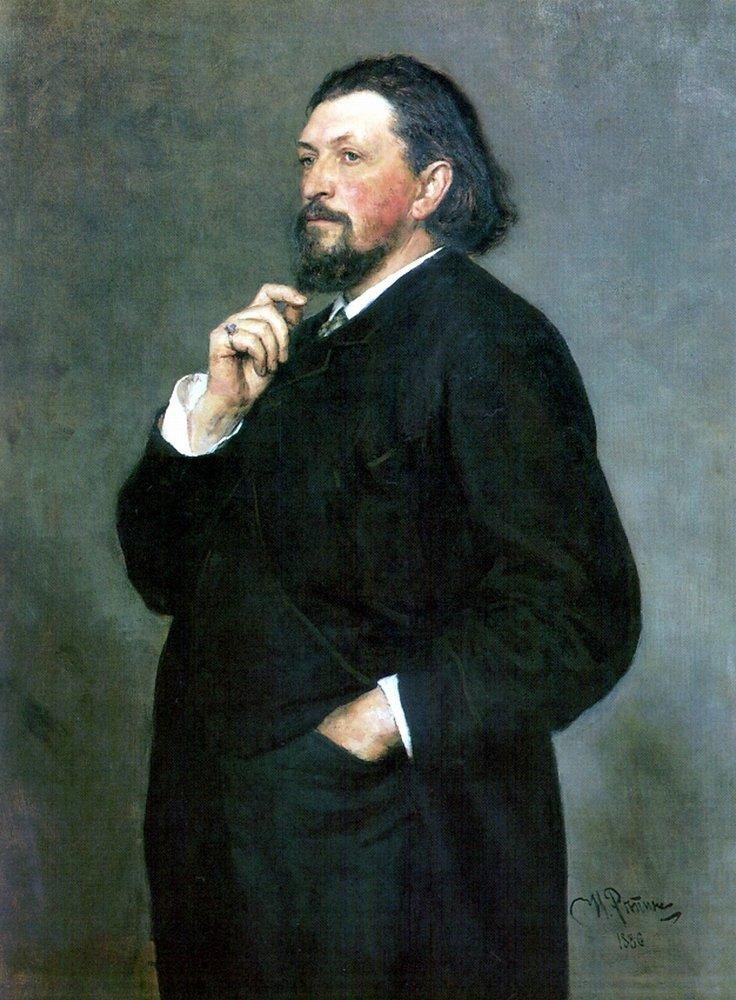
Portrait by Ilya Repin of M. P. Belyayev, founder of the Russian Symphony Concerts

Rimsky-Korsakov wrote that he became acquainted with budding music patron Mitrofan Belyayev (M. P. Belaieff) in Moscow in 1882. Belyayev was one of a growing coterie of Russian nouveau-riche industrialists who became patrons of the arts in mid- to late-19th century Russia; their number included railway magnate Savva Mamontov and textile manufacturer Pavel Tretyakov. Belyayev, Mamontov and Tretyakov "wanted to contribute conspicuously to public life". They had worked their way into wealth, and being Slavophiles in their national outlook believed in the greater glory of Russia. Owing to this belief, they were more likely than the aristocracy to support native talent, and were more inclined to support nationalist artists over cosmopolitan ones. This preference paralleled a general upsurge in nationalism and Russophilia that became prevalent in mainstream Russian art and society.

By 1883 Rimsky-Korsakov had become a regular visitor to the weekly "quartet Fridays" ("Les Vendredis") held at Belyayev's home in Saint Petersburg. Belyayev, who had already taken a keen interest in the musical future of the teenage Alexander Glazunov, rented a hall and hired an orchestra in 1884 to play Glazunov's First Symphony plus an orchestral suite Glazunov had just composed. This concert and a rehearsal the previous year gave Rimsky-Korsakov the idea of offering concerts featuring Russian compositions, a prospect to which Belyayev was amenable. The Russian Symphony Concerts were inaugurated during the 1886–87 season, with Rimsky-Korsakov sharing conducting duties with Anatoly Lyadov. He finished his revision of Mussorgsky's Night on Bald Mountain and conducted it at the opening concert. The concerts also coaxed him out of his creative drought; he wrote Scheherazade, Capriccio Espagnol and the Russian Easter Overture specifically for them. He noted that these three works "show a considerable falling off in the use of contrapuntal devices ... [replaced] by a strong and virtuoso development of every kind of figuration which sustains the technical interest of my compositions".

Rimsky-Korsakov was asked for advice and guidance not just on the Russian Symphony Concerts, but on other projects through which Belyayev aided Russian composers. "By force of matters purely musical I turned out to be the head of the Belyayev circle", he wrote. "As the head Belyayev, too, considered me, consulting me about everything and referring everyone to me as chief". In 1884 Belyayev set up an annual Glinka prize, and in 1885 he founded his own music publishing firm, through which he published works by Borodin, Glazunov, Lyadov and Rimsky-Korsakov at his own expense. To select which composers to assist with money, publication or performances from the many who now appealed for help, Belyayev set up an advisory council made up of Glazunov, Lyadov and Rimsky-Korsakov. They would look through the compositions and appeals submitted and suggest which composers were deserving of patronage and public attention.

The group of composers who now congregated with Glazunov, Lyadov and Rimsky-Korsakov became known as the Belyayev circle, named after their financial benefactor. These composers were nationalistic in their musical outlook, as The Five before them had been. Like The Five, they believed in a uniquely Russian style of classical music that utilized folk music and exotic melodic, harmonic and rhythmic elements, as exemplified by the music of Balakirev, Borodin and Rimsky-Korsakov. Unlike The Five, these composers also believed in the necessity of an academic, Western-based background in composition—which Rimsky-Korsakov had instilled in his years at the Saint Petersburg Conservatory. Compared to the "revolutionary" composers in Balakirev's circle, Rimsky-Korsakov found those in the Belyayev circle to be "progressive ... attaching as it did great importance to technical perfection, but ... also broke new paths, though more securely, even if less speedily ..."

=== Increased contact with Tchaikovsky ===
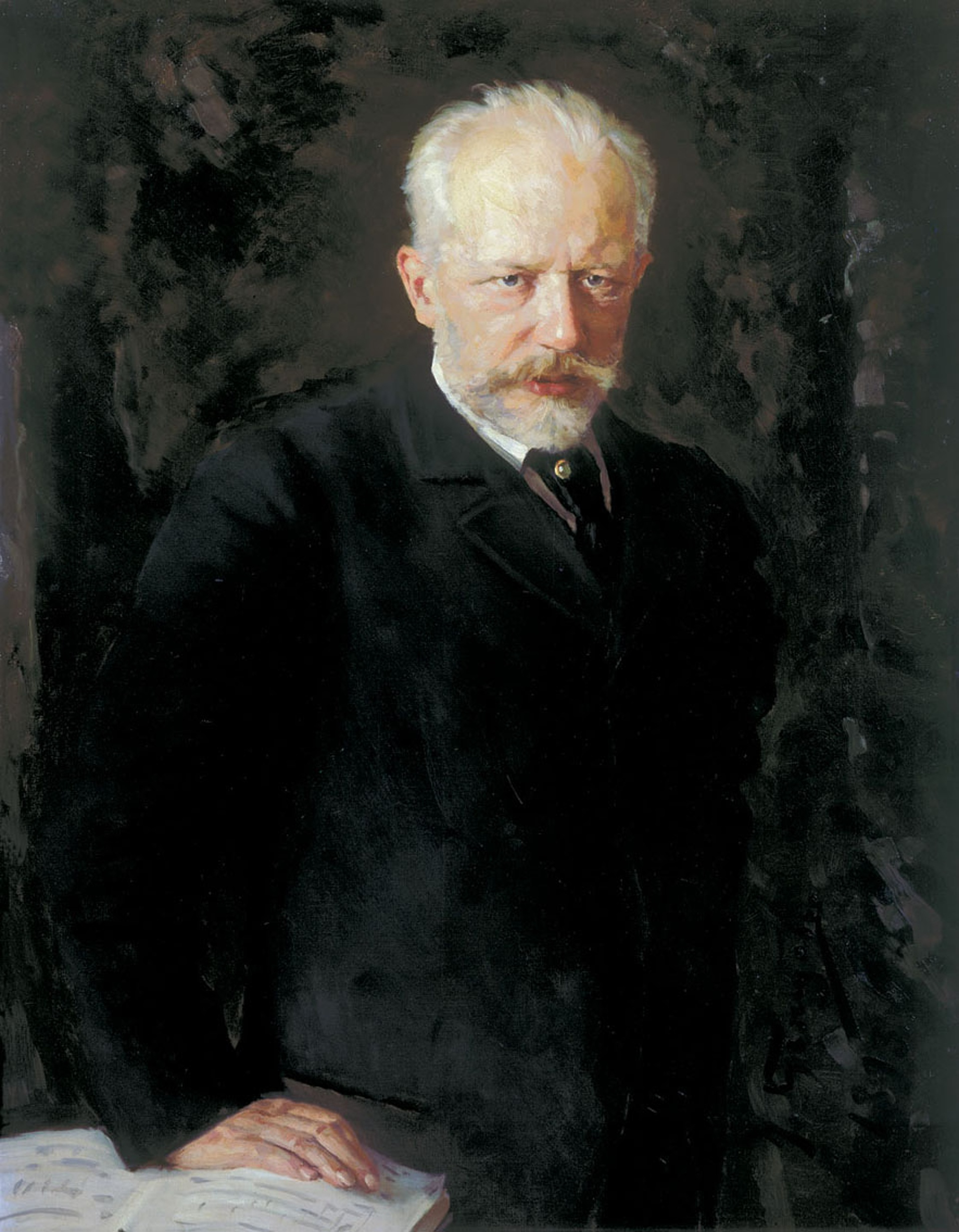
Pyotr Ilyich Tchaikovsky by Nikolay Kuznetsov, 1893

In November 1887, Tchaikovsky arrived in Saint Petersburg in time to hear several of the Russian Symphony Concerts. One of them included the first complete performance of his First Symphony, subtitled Winter Daydreams, in its final version. Another concert featured the premiere of Rimsky-Korsakov's Third Symphony in its revised version. Rimsky-Korsakov and Tchaikovsky corresponded considerably before the visit and spent a lot of time together, along with Glazunov and Lyadov. Though Tchaikovsky had been a regular visitor to the Rimsky-Korsakov home since 1876, and had at one point offered to arrange Rimsky-Korsakov's appointment as director of the Moscow Conservatory, this was the beginning of closer relations between the two. Within a couple of years, Rimsky-Korsakov wrote, Tchaikovsky's visits became more frequent.

During these visits and especially in public, Rimsky-Korsakov wore a mask of geniality. Privately, he found the situation emotionally complex, and confessed his fears to his friend, the Moscow critic Semyon Kruglikov. Memories persisted of the tension between Tchaikovsky and The Five over the differences in their musical philosophies—tension acute enough for Tchaikovsky's brother Modest to liken their relations at that time to "those between two friendly neighboring states ... cautiously prepared to meet on common ground, but jealously guarding their separate interests". Rimsky-Korsakov observed, not without annoyance, how Tchaikovsky became increasingly popular among Rimsky-Korsakov's followers. This personal jealousy was compounded by a professional one, as Tchaikovsky's music became increasingly popular among the composers of the Belyayev circle, and remained on the whole more famous than his own. Even so, when Tchaikovsky attended Rimsky-Korsakov's nameday party in May 1893, Rimsky-Korsakov asked Tchaikovsky personally if he would conduct four concerts of the Russian Musical Society in Saint Petersburg the following season. After hesitation, Tchaikovsky agreed. While his sudden death in late 1893 prevented him from fulfilling this commitment in its entirety, the list of works he had planned to conduct included Rimsky-Korsakov's Third Symphony.

=== Increasing conservatism; second creative drought ===
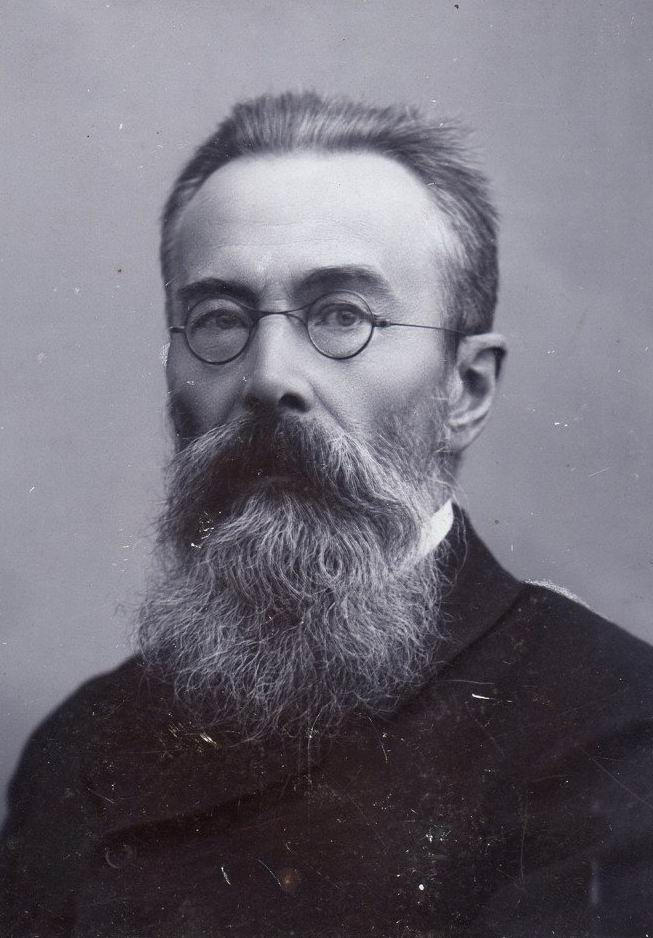
Rimsky-Korsakov (before 1908)

In March 1889, Angelo Neumann's traveling "Richard Wagner Theater" visited Saint Petersburg, giving four cycles of Der Ring des Nibelungen there under the direction of Karl Muck. The Five had ignored Wagner's music, but The Ring impressed Rimsky-Korsakov: he was astonished with Wagner's mastery of orchestration. He attended the rehearsals with Glazunov, and followed the score. After hearing these performances, Rimsky-Korsakov devoted himself almost exclusively to composing operas for the rest of his creative life. Wagner's use of the orchestra influenced Rimsky-Korsakov's orchestration, beginning with the arrangement of the polonaise from Mussorgsky's Boris Godunov that he made for concert use in 1889.

Toward music more adventurous than Wagner's, especially that of Richard Strauss and later Claude Debussy, Rimsky-Korsakov's mind remained closed. He would fume for days afterwards when he heard pianist Felix Blumenfeld play Debussy's Estampes and write in his diary about them, "Poor and skimpy to the nth degree; there is no technique, even less imagination." This was part of an increasing musical conservatism on his part (his "musical conscience", as he put it), under which he now scrutinized his music and that of others as well. Compositions by his former compatriots in The Five were not immune. While working on his first revision of Mussorgsky's Boris Godunov, in 1895 he would tell his amanuensis, Vasily Yastrebtsev, "It's incredible that I ever could have liked this music and yet it seems there was such a time." By 1901 he would write of growing "indignant at all [of Wagner's] blunders of the ear"—this about the same music which caught his attention in 1889.

In 1892, Rimsky-Korsakov suffered a second creative drought, brought on by bouts of depression and alarming physical symptoms. Rushes of blood to the head, confusion, memory loss and unpleasant obsessions led to a medical diagnosis of neurasthenia. Crises in the Rimsky-Korsakov household may have been a factor—the serious illnesses of his wife and one of his sons from diphtheria in 1890, the deaths of his mother and youngest child, as well as the onset of the prolonged, ultimately fatal illness of his second youngest child. He resigned from the Russian Symphony Concerts and the Court Chapel and considered giving up composition permanently. After making third versions of the musical tableau Sadko and the opera The Maid of Pskov, he closed his musical account with the past; he had left none of his major works before May Night in their original form.

Another death brought about a creative renewal. The passing of Tchaikovsky presented a twofold opportunity—to write for the Imperial Theaters and to compose an opera based on Nikolai Gogol's short story Christmas Eve, a work on which Tchaikovsky had based his opera Vakula the Smith. The success of Rimsky-Korsakov's Christmas Eve encouraged him to complete an opera approximately every 18 months between 1893 and 1908 — a total of 11 during this period. He also started and abandoned another draft of his treatise on orchestration, but made a third attempt and almost finished it in the last four years of his life. (His son-in-law Maximilian Steinberg completed the book in 1912.) Rimsky-Korsakov's scientific treatment of orchestration, illustrated with more than 300 examples from his work, set a new standard for texts of its kind.

=== 1905 Revolution ===
In 1905, demonstrations took place in the St. Petersburg Conservatory as part of the 1905 Revolution; these, Rimsky-Korsakov wrote, were triggered by similar disturbances at St. Petersburg State University, in which students demanded political reforms and the establishment of a constitutional monarchy in Russia. "I was chosen a member of the committee for adjusting differences with agitated pupils", he recalled; almost as soon as the committee had been formed, "[a]ll sorts of measures were recommended to expel the ringleaders, to quarter the police in the Conservatory, to close the Conservatory entirely".

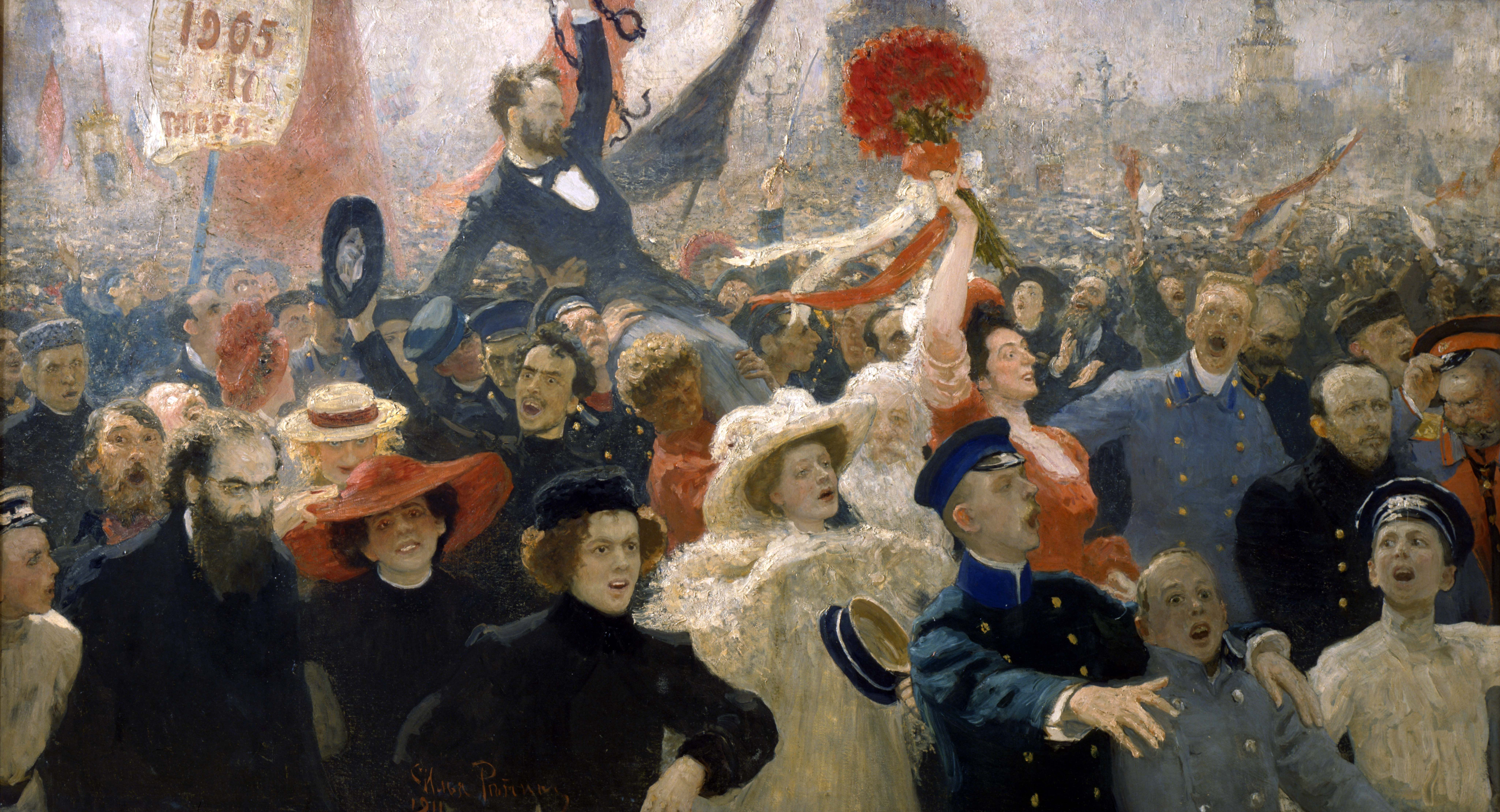
Ilya Repin, 17 October 1905

A lifelong liberal politically, Rimsky-Korsakov wrote that he felt someone had to protect the rights of the students to demonstrate, especially as disputes and wrangling between students and authorities were becoming increasingly violent. In an open letter, he sided with the students against what he saw as unwarranted interference by Conservatory leadership and the Russian Musical Society. A second letter, this time signed by a number of faculty including Rimsky-Korsakov, demanded the resignation of the head of the Conservatory. Partly as a result of these two letters he wrote, approximately 100 Conservatory students were expelled and he was removed from his professorship.

Just before the dismissal was enacted, Rimsky-Korsakov received a letter from one of the members of the school directorate, suggesting that he take up the directorship in the interest of calming student unrest. "Probably the member of the Directorate held a minority opinion, but signed the resolution nevertheless," he wrote. "I sent a negative reply." Partly in defiance of his dismissal, Rimsky-Korsakov continued teaching his students from his home.

Not long after Rimsky-Korsakov's dismissal, a student production of his opera Kashchey the Immortal was followed not with the scheduled concert but with a political demonstration, which led to a police ban on Rimsky-Korsakov's work. Due in part to widespread press coverage of these events, an immediate wave of outrage against the ban arose throughout Russia and abroad; liberals and intellectuals deluged the composer's residence with letters of sympathy, and even peasants who had not heard a note of Rimsky-Korsakov's music sent small monetary donations. Several faculty members of the St. Petersburg Conservatory resigned in protest, including Glazunov and Lyadov. Eventually, over 300 students walked out of the Conservatory in solidarity with Rimsky-Korsakov. By December he had been reinstated under a new director, Glazunov. Rimsky-Korsakov retired from the Conservatory in 1906. The political controversy continued with his opera The Golden Cockerel. Its implied criticism of monarchy, Russian imperialism and the Russo-Japanese War gave it little chance of passing the censors. The premiere was delayed until 1909, after Rimsky-Korsakov's death, and even then it was performed in an adapted version.

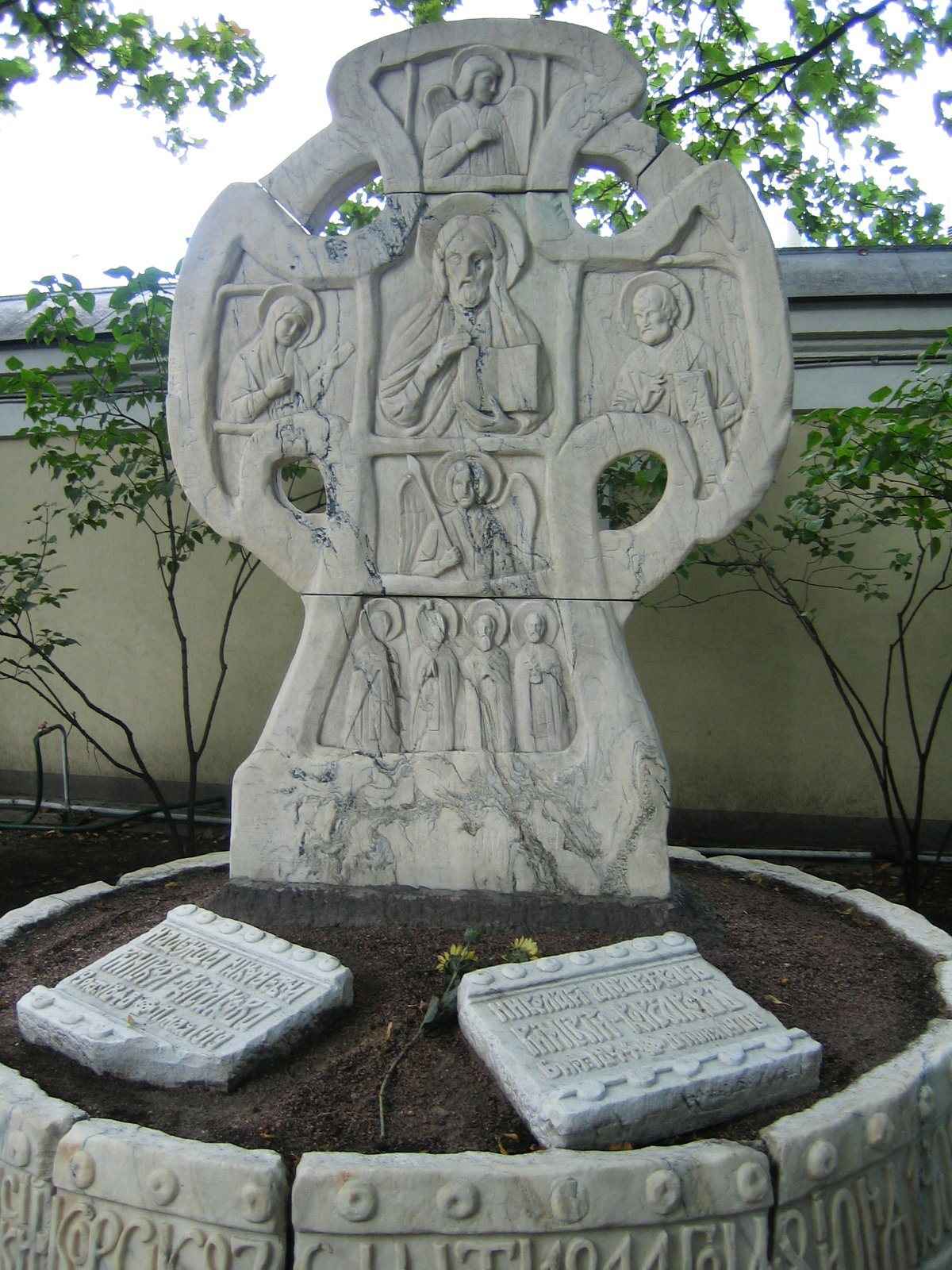
Rimsky-Korsakov's grave at Tikhvin Cemetery in the Alexander Nevsky Monastery

In April 1907, Rimsky-Korsakov conducted a pair of concerts in Paris, hosted by impresario Sergei Diaghilev, which featured music of the Russian nationalist school. The concerts were hugely successful in popularizing Russian classical music of this kind in Europe, Rimsky-Korsakov's in particular. The following year, his opera Sadko was produced at the Paris Opéra and The Snow Maiden at the Opéra-Comique. He also had the opportunity to hear more recent music by European composers. He hissed unabashedly when he heard Richard Strauss's opera Salome, and told Diaghilev after hearing Claude Debussy's opera Pelléas et Mélisande, "Don't make me listen to all these horrors or I shall end up liking them!" Hearing these works led him to appreciate his place in the world of classical music. He admitted that he was a "convinced kuchkist" (after kuchka, the shortened Russian term for The Five) and that his works belonged to an era that musical trends had left behind.

=== Death ===
Beginning around 1890, Rimsky-Korsakov suffered from angina. While this ailment initially wore him down gradually, the stresses concurrent with the 1905 Revolution and its aftermath greatly accelerated its progress. After December 1907, his illness became severe, and he could not work.

In 1908, he died at the age of 64 in his Lubensk estate near Luga (modern day Plyussky District of Pskov Oblast), and was interred in Tikhvin Cemetery at the Alexander Nevsky Monastery in Saint Petersburg, next to Borodin, Glinka, Mussorgsky and Stasov.

== Compositions ==
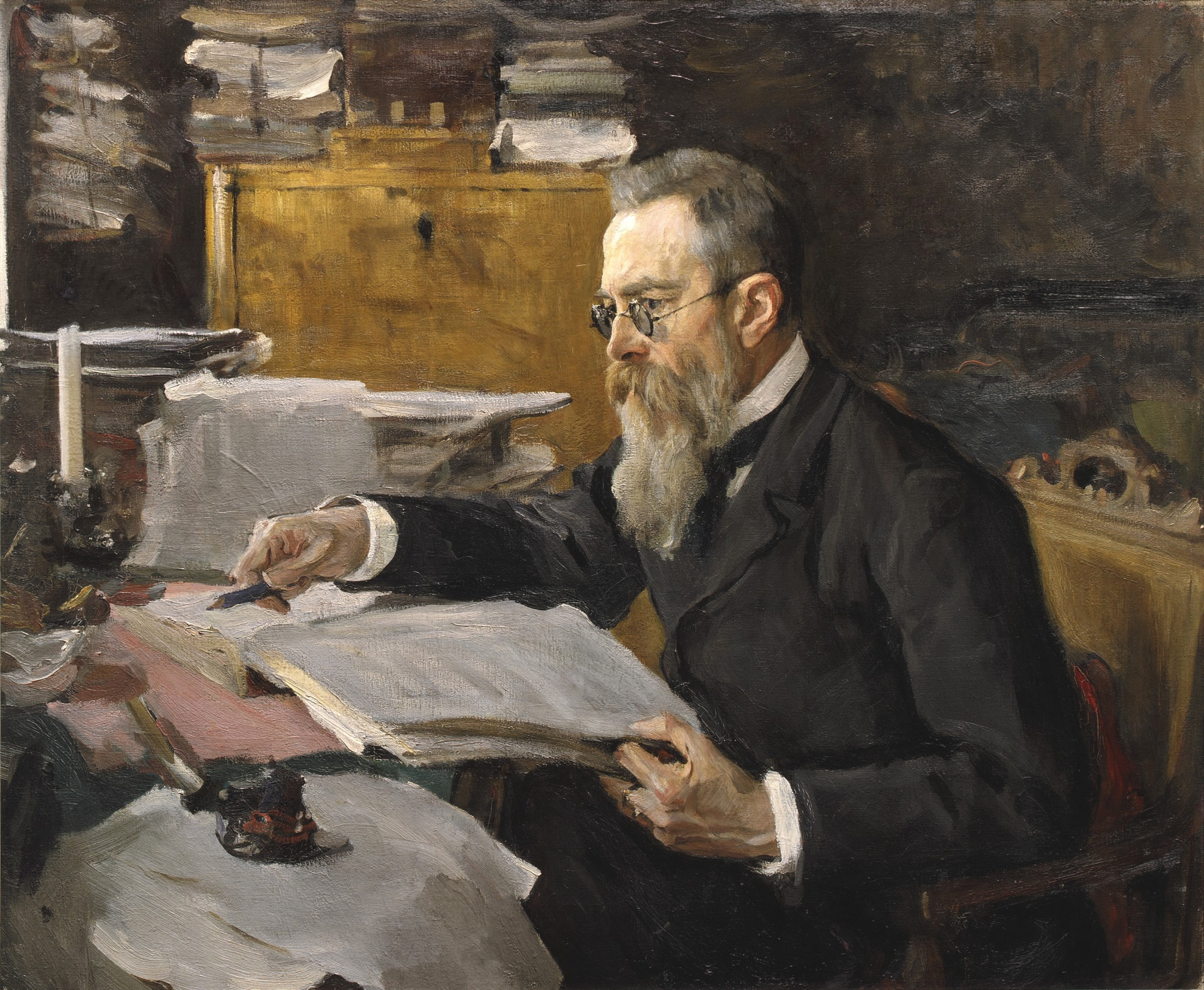
Portrait of Nikolai Rimsky-Korsakov by Valentin Serov (1898)

Rimsky-Korsakov followed the musical ideals espoused by The Five. He employed Orthodox liturgical themes in the Russian Easter Festival Overture, folk song in Capriccio Espagnol and orientalism in Scheherazade, possibly his best known work. He proved a prolific composer but also a perpetually self-critical one. He revised every orchestral work up to and including his Third Symphony—some, like Antar and Sadko, more than once. These revisions range from minor changes of tempo, phrasing and instrumental detail to wholesale transposition and complete recomposition.

Rimsky-Korsakov was open about the influences in his music, telling Vasily Yastrebtsev, "Study Liszt and Balakirev more closely, and you'll see that a great deal in me is not mine". He followed Balakirev in his use of the whole tone scale, treatment of folk songs and musical orientalism and Liszt for harmonic adventurousness. (The violin melody used to portray Scheherazade is very closely related to its counterpart in Balakirev's symphonic poem Tamara, while the Russian Easter Overtures follows the design and plan of Balakirev's Second Overture on Russian Themes.)

Nevertheless, while he took Glinka and Liszt as his harmonic models, his use of whole tone and octatonic scales do demonstrate his originality. He developed both these compositional devices for the "fantastic" sections of his operas, which depicted magical or supernatural characters and events.

Rimsky-Korsakov maintained an interest in harmonic experiments and continued exploring new idioms throughout his career. He tempered this interest with an abhorrence of excess and kept his tendency to experiment under constant control. The more radical his harmonies became, the more he attempted to control them with strict rules—applying his "musical conscience", as he called it. In this sense, he was both a progressive and a conservative composer. The whole tone and octatonic scales were both considered adventurous in the Western classical tradition, and Rimsky-Korsakov's use of them made his harmonies seem radical. Conversely, his care about how or when in a composition he used these scales made him seem conservative compared with later composers like Igor Stravinsky, though they were often building on Rimsky-Korsakov's work.

=== Operas ===
Music samples
Flight of the Bumblebee
Flight of the Bumblebee performed by US Army Band

The Flight of the Bumblebee
Arrangement for two pianos by Russel Warner, performed by Neal and Nancy O'Doan

The Song of the Indian Guest
1929 recording of transcription for violin and piano, featuring violinist Váša Příhoda

While Rimsky-Korsakov is best known in the West for his orchestral works, his operas are more complex, offering a wider variety of orchestral effects than in his instrumental works, and fine vocal writing. Excerpts and suites from them have proved as popular in the West as the purely orchestral works. The best-known of these excerpts is probably "Flight of the Bumblebee" from The Tale of Tsar Saltan, which has often been heard by itself in orchestral programs, and in countless arrangements and transcriptions, most famously in a piano version made by Russian composer Sergei Rachmaninoff. Other selections familiar to listeners in the West are "Dance of the Tumblers" from The Snow Maiden, "Procession of the Nobles" from Mlada, and "Song of the Indian Guest" (or, less accurately, "Song of India") from Sadko, as well as suites from The Golden Cockerel and The Legend of the Invisible City of Kitezh and the Maiden Fevroniya.

The Operas fall into three categories:

- Historical drama: The Maid of Pskov, and its prologue The Noblewoman Vera Sheloga, Mozart and Salieri, The Tsar's Bride, Pan Voyevoda, Servilya
- Folk operas: May Night, Christmas Eve
- Fairy tales and legends: The Snow Maiden, Mlada, Sadko, Kashchey the Deathless, The Tale of Tsar Saltan, The Legend of the Invisible City of Kitezh and the Maiden Fevroniya, and The Golden Cockerel.

Of this range, Rimsky-Korsakov wrote in 1902, "In every new work of mine I am trying to do something that is new for me. On the one hand, I am pushed on by the thought that in this way, [my music] will retain freshness and interest, but at the same time I am prompted by my pride to think that many facets, devices, moods and styles, if not all, should be within my reach."

A pair of commentators wrote that among his operatic works, Rimsky-Korsakov's "Snegurochka", also known as "The Snow-Maiden", sums up his compositional character. The Snow-maiden is a character who is the personification of love and passion, and yet she melts in the first rays of the sun. Rimsky-Korsakov's works mirror the snow-maiden, as they are exquisite, but can quickly turn cold and pellucid and "dissolve at the touch of the living language of passion".

The American music critic and journalist Harold C. Schonberg wrote that the operas "open up a delightful new world, the world of the Russian East, the world of supernaturalism and the exotic, the world of Slavic pantheism and vanished races. Genuine poetry suffuses them, and they are scored with brilliance and resource." According to some critics Rimsky-Korsakov's music in these works lacks dramatic power, a seemingly fatal flaw in an operatic composer. This may have been conscious, as he repeatedly stated in his writing that he felt operas were first and foremost musical works rather than mainly dramatic ones. Ironically, the operas succeed dramatically in most cases by being deliberately non-theatrical.

=== Orchestral works ===
The purely orchestral works fall into two categories. The best-known ones in the West, and perhaps the finest in overall quality, are mainly programmatic in nature — in other words, the musical content and how it is handled in the piece is determined by the plot or characters in a story, the action in a painting or events reported through another non-musical source. The second category of works is more academic, such as his First and Third Symphonies and his Sinfonietta. In these, Rimsky-Korsakov still employed folk themes but subjected them to abstract rules of musical composition.

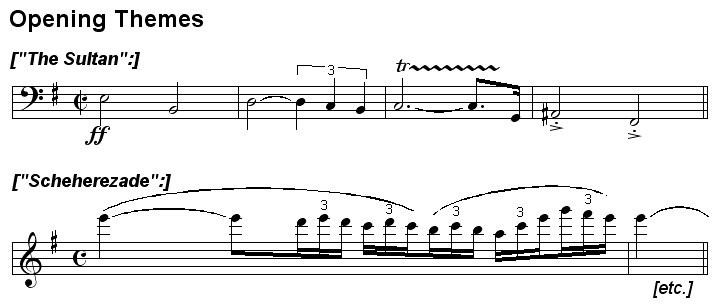
Opening themes of the Sultan and Scheherazade

Program music came naturally to Rimsky-Korsakov. To him, "even a folk theme has a program of sorts." He composed the majority of his orchestral works in this genre at two periods of his career—at the beginning, with Sadko and Antar (also known as his Second Symphony, Op. 9), and in the 1880s, with Scheherazade, Capriccio Espagnol and the Russian Easter Overture. Despite the gap between these two periods, the composer's overall approach and the way he used his musical themes remained consistent. Both Antar and Scheherazade use a robust "Russian" theme to portray the male protagonists (the title character in Antar; the sultan in Scheherazade) and a more sinuous "Eastern" theme for the female ones (the peri Gul-Nazar in Antar and the title character in Scheherazade).

Where Rimsky-Korsakov changed between these two sets of works was in orchestration. While his pieces were always celebrated for their imaginative use of instrumental forces, the sparser textures of Sadko and Antar pale compared to the luxuriance of the more popular works of the 1880s. While a principle of highlighting "primary hues" of instrumental color remained in place, it was augmented in the later works by a sophisticated cachet of orchestral effects, some gleaned from other composers including Wagner, but many invented by himself.

As a result, these works resemble brightly colored mosaics, striking in their own right and often scored with a juxtaposition of pure orchestral groups. The final tutti of Scheherazade is a prime example of this scoring. The theme is assigned to trombones playing in unison, and is accompanied by a combination of string patterns. Meanwhile, another pattern alternates with chromatic scales in the woodwinds and a third pattern of rhythms is played by percussion.

Rimsky-Korsakov's non-program music, though well-crafted, does not rise to the same level of inspiration as his programmatic works; he needed fantasy to bring out the best in him. The First Symphony follows the outlines of Schumann's Fourth extremely closely, and is slighter in its thematic material than his later compositions. The Third Symphony and Sinfonietta each contain a series of variations on less-than-the-best music that can lead to tedium.

=== Smaller-scale works ===
Rimsky-Korsakov composed dozens of art songs, arrangements of folk songs, chamber and piano music. While the piano music is relatively unimportant, many of the art songs possess a delicate beauty. While they yield in overt lyricism to Tchaikovsky and Rachmaninoff, otherwise they reserve their place in the standard repertory of Russian singers.

Rimsky-Korsakov also wrote a body of choral works, both secular and for Russian Orthodox Church service. The latter include settings of portions of the Liturgy of St. John Chrysostom (despite his own atheism).

== Legacy ==
=== Transitional figure ===
The critic Vladimir Stasov, who along with Balakirev had founded The Five, wrote in 1882, "Beginning with Glinka, all the best Russian musicians have been very skeptical of book learning and have never approached it with the servility and the superstitious reverence with which it is approached to this day in many parts of Europe." This statement was not true for Glinka, who studied Western music theory assiduously with Siegfried Dehn in Berlin before he composed his opera A Life for the Tsar. It was true for Balakirev, who "opposed academicism with tremendous vigor," and it was true initially for Rimsky-Korsakov, who had been imbued by Balakirev and Stasov with the same attitude.

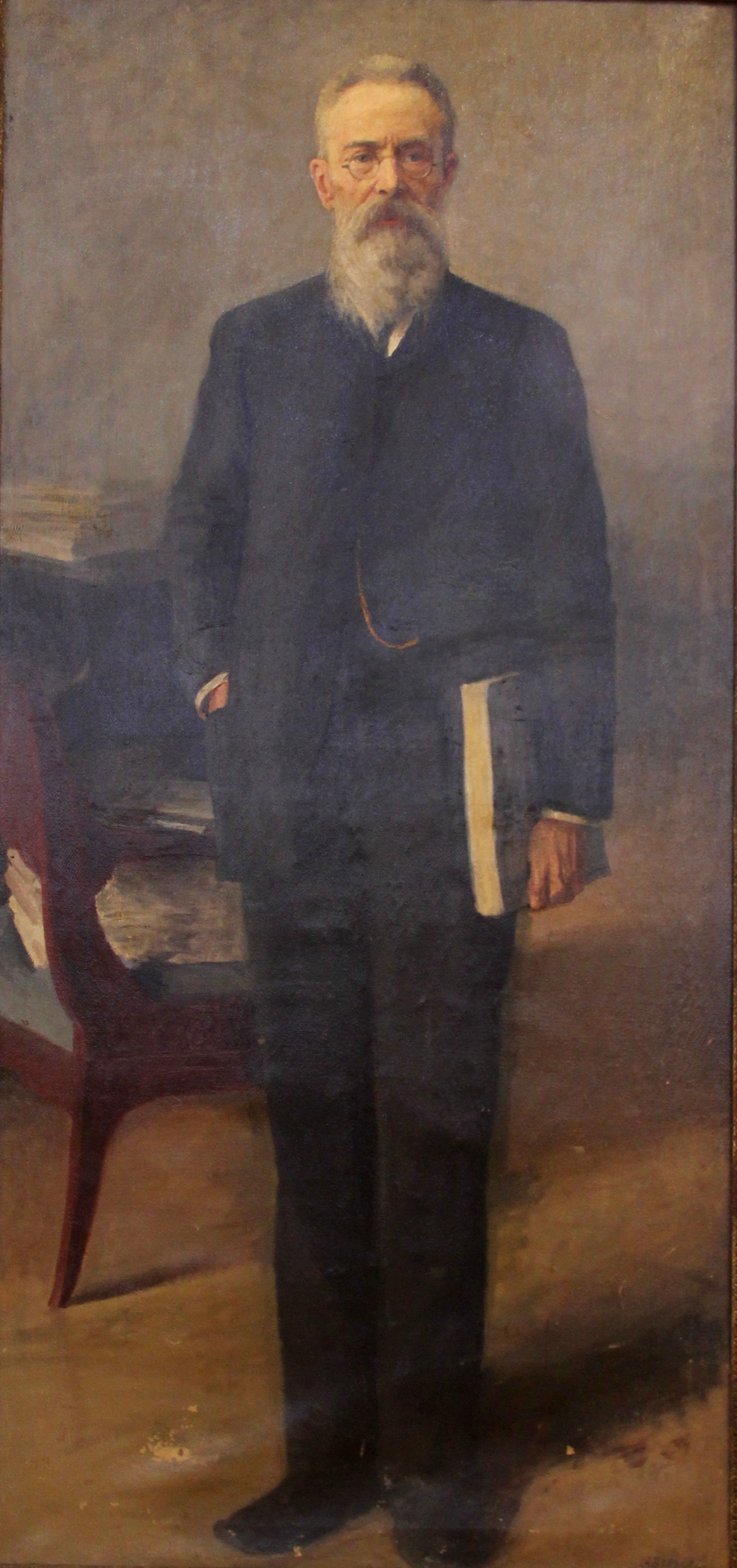
Nikolai Rimsky-Korsakov by Emil Wiesel

One point Stasov omitted purposely, which would have disproved his statement completely, was that at the time he wrote it, Rimsky-Korsakov had been pouring his "book learning" into students at the Saint Petersburg Conservatory for over a decade. Beginning with his three years of self-imposed study, Rimsky-Korsakov had drawn closer to Tchaikovsky and further away from the rest of The Five, while the rest of The Five had drawn back from him and Stasov had branded him a "renegade". Richard Taruskin wrote, "The older he became, the greater was the irony with which Rimsky-Korsakov looked back on his kuchkist days." When the young Semyon Kruglikov was considering a future in composition, Rimsky-Korsakov wrote the future critic,

About a talent for composition ... I can say nothing as yet. You have tried your powers too little ... Yes, one can study on one's own. Sometimes one needs advice, but one must study ... All of us, that is, I myself and Borodin, and Balakirev, and especially Cui and Mussorgsky, did disdain these things. I consider myself lucky that I bethought myself in time and forced myself to work. As for Balakirev, owing to his insufficient technique he writes little; Borodin, with difficulty; Cui, carelessly; and Mussorgsky, sloppily and often incoherently.

Taruskin points out this statement, which Rimsky-Korsakov wrote while Borodin and Mussorgsky were still alive, as proof of his estrangement from the rest of The Five and an indication of the kind of teacher he eventually became. By the time he instructed Liadov and Glazunov, "their training hardly differed from [Tchaikovsky's]. An ideal of the strictest professionalism was instilled in them from the beginning." By the time Borodin died in 1887, the era of autodidactism for Russian composers had effectively ended. Every Russian who aspired to write classical music attended a conservatory and received the same formal education. "There was no more 'Moscow', no 'St. Petersburg'." Taruskin writes; "at last all Russia was one. Moreover, by century's end, the theory and composition faculties of Rubinstein's Conservatory were entirely in the hands of representatives of the New Russian School. Viewed against the background of Stasov's predictions, there could scarcely be any greater irony."

=== Students ===
Rimsky-Korsakov taught theory and composition to 250 students over his 35-year tenure at the Saint Petersburg Conservatory, "enough to people a whole 'school' of composers". This does not include pupils at the two other schools where he taught, including Glazunov, or those he taught privately at his home, such as Igor Stravinsky. Apart from Glazunov and Stravinsky, students who later found fame included Anatoly Lyadov; Mikhail Ippolitov-Ivanov; Alexander Spendiaryan; Sergei Prokofiev; Ottorino Respighi; Witold Maliszewski; Mykola Lysenko; Artur Kapp; and Konstanty Gorski. Other students included the music critic and musicologist Alexander Ossovsky, and the composer Lazare Saminsky.

Rimsky-Korsakov felt talented students needed little formal dictated instruction. His teaching method included distinct steps: show the students everything needed in harmony and counterpoint; direct them in understanding the forms of composition; give them a year or two of systematic study in the development of technique, exercises in free composition and orchestration; instill a good knowledge of the piano. Once these were properly completed, studies would be over. He carried this attitude into his conservatory classes. Conductor Nikolai Malko remembered that Rimsky-Korsakov began the first class of the term by saying, "I will speak, and you will listen. Then I will speak less, and you will start to work. And finally I will not speak at all, and you will work." Malko added that his class followed exactly this pattern. "Rimsky-Korsakov explained everything so clearly and simply that all we had to do was to do our work well."

=== Editing the work of The Five ===
Rimsky-Korsakov's editing of works by The Five is significant. It was a practical extension of the collaborative atmosphere of The Five during the 1860s and 1870s, when they heard each other's compositions in progress and worked on them together, and was an effort to save works that would otherwise either have languished unheard or become lost entirely. This work included the completion of Alexander Borodin's opera Prince Igor, which Rimsky-Korsakov undertook with the help of Glazunov after Borodin's death, and the orchestration of passages from César Cui's William Ratcliff for its first production in 1869. He also completely orchestrated the opera The Stone Guest by Alexander Dargomyzhsky three times—in 1869–70, 1892 and 1902. While not a member of The Five himself, Dargomyzhsky was closely associated with the group and shared their musical philosophy.

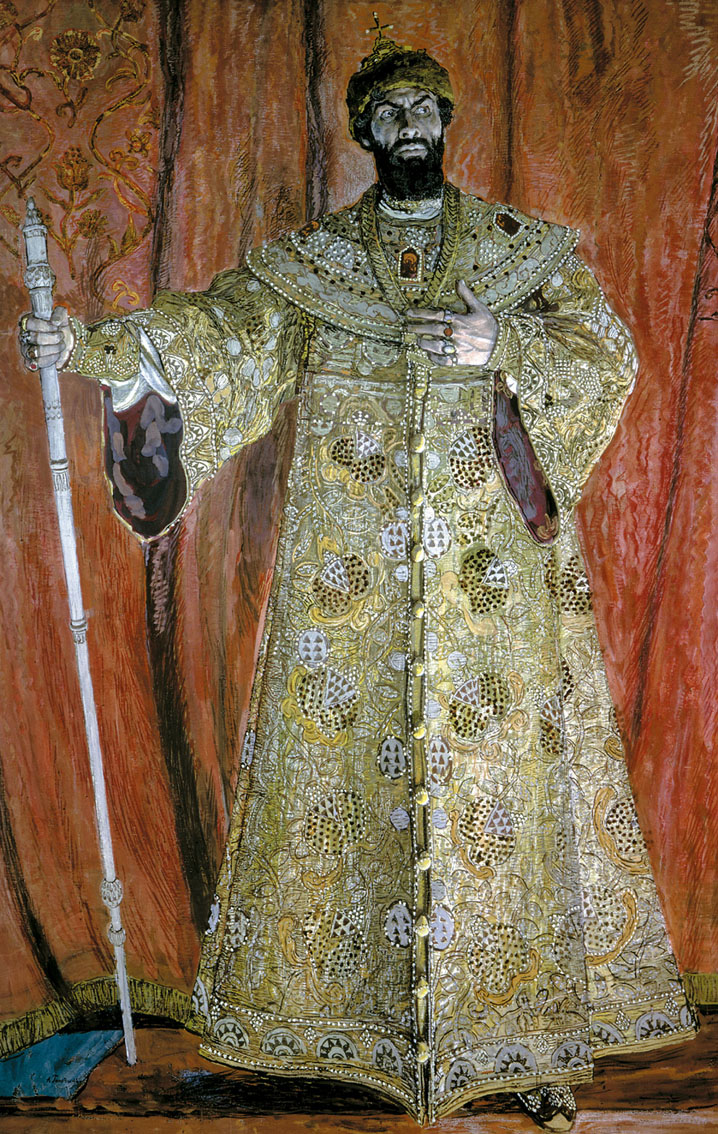
Fyodor Chaliapin was a powerful exponent of the Rimsky-Korsakov version of Boris Godunov, which launched the work in the world's opera houses, but has since fallen out of favor. Portrait by Aleksandr Golovin.

Musicologist Francis Maes wrote that while Rimsky-Korsakov's efforts are laudable, they are also controversial. It was generally assumed that with Prince Igor, Rimsky-Korsakov edited and orchestrated the existing fragments of the opera while Glazunov composed and added missing parts, including most of the third act and the overture. This was exactly what Rimsky-Korsakov stated in his memoirs. Both Maes and Richard Taruskin cite an analysis of Borodin's manuscripts by musicologist Pavel Lamm, which showed that Rimsky-Korsakov and Glazunov discarded nearly 20 percent of Borodin's score. According to Maes, the result is more a collaborative effort by all three composers than a true representation of Borodin's intent. Lamm stated that because of the extremely chaotic state of Borodin's manuscripts, a modern alternative to Rimsky-Korsakov and Glazunov's edition would be extremely difficult to complete.

More debatable, according to Maes, is Rimsky-Korsakov's editing of Mussorgsky's works. After Mussorgsky's death in 1881, Rimsky-Korsakov revised and completed several of Mussorgsky's works for publication and performance, helping to spread Mussorgsky's works throughout Russia and to the West. Maes, in reviewing Mussorgsky's scores, wrote that Rimsky-Korsakov allowed his "musical conscience" to dictate his editing, and he changed or removed what he considered musical over-experimentation or poor form. Because of this, Rimsky-Korsakov has been accused of pedantry in "correcting", among other things, matters of harmony. Rimsky-Korsakov may have foreseen questions over his efforts when he wrote,

If Mussorgsky's compositions are destined to live unfaded for fifty years after their author's death (when all his works will become the property of any and every publisher), such an archeologically accurate edition will always be possible, as the manuscripts went to the Public Library on leaving me. For the present, though, there was need of an edition for performances, for practical artistic purposes, for making his colossal talent known, and not for the mere studying of his personality and artistic sins.

Maes stated that time proved Rimsky-Korsakov correct when it came to posterity's re-evaluation of Mussorgsky's work. Mussorgsky's musical style, once considered unpolished, is now admired for its originality. While Rimsky-Korsakov's arrangement of Night on Bald Mountain is still the version generally performed, Rimsky-Korsakov's other revisions, like his version of Boris Godunov, have been replaced by Mussorgsky's original.

== Folklore and pantheism ==
Rimsky-Korsakov may have saved the most personal side of his creativity for his approach to Russian folklore. Folklorism as practiced by Balakirev and the other members of The Five had been based largely on the protyazhnaya dance song. Protyazhnaya literally meant "drawn-out song", or melismatically elaborated lyric song. The characteristics of this song exhibit extreme rhythmic flexibility, an asymmetrical phrase structure and tonal ambiguity. After composing May Night, Rimsky-Korsakov was increasingly drawn to "calendar songs", which were written for specific ritual occasions. The ties to folk culture was what interested him most in folk music, even in his days with The Five; these songs formed a part of rural customs, echoed old Slavic paganism and the pantheistic world of folk rites. Rimsky-Korsakov wrote that his interest in these songs was heightened by his study of them while compiling his folk song collections. He wrote that he "was captivated by the poetic side of the cult of sun-worship, and sought its survivals and echoes in both the tunes and the words of the songs. The pictures of the ancient pagan period and spirit loomed before me, as it then seemed, with great clarity, luring me on with the charm of antiquity. These occupations subsequently had a great influence in the direction of my own activity as a composer".

Rimsky-Korsakov's interest in pantheism was whetted by the folkloristic studies of Alexander Afanasyev. That author's standard work, The Poetic Outlook on Nature by the Slavs, became Rimsky-Korsakov's pantheistic bible. The composer first applied Afanasyev's ideas in May Night, in which he helped fill out Gogol's story by using folk dances and calendar songs. He went further down this path in The Snow Maiden, where he made extensive use of seasonal calendar songs and khorovodi (ceremonial dances) in the folk tradition.

Musicologists and Slavicists have long recognized that Rimsky-Korsakov was an ecumenical artist whose folklore-inspired operas take up such issues as the relationship between paganism and Christianity and the seventeenth-century schism in the Orthodox Church.

== In film ==
- The Soviet 1953 film Rimsky-Korsakov presents the last twenty years of his life. He is played by Grigori Belov. His earlier years with The Five were portrayed by Andrei Popov in the 1950 film from the same studio titled Mussorgsky.

== Publications ==
Rimsky-Korsakov's autobiography and his books on harmony and orchestration have been translated into English and published. Two books he started in 1892 but left unfinished were a comprehensive text on Russian music and a manuscript, now lost, on an unknown subject.

- My Musical Life. [Летопись моей музыкальной жизни – literally, Chronicle of My Musical Life.] Trans. from the 5th rev. Russian ed. by Judah A. Joffe; ed. with an introduction by Carl Van Vechten. London: Ernst Eulenburg Ltd, 1974.
- Practical Manual of Harmony. [Практический учебник гармонии.] First published, in Russian, in 1885. First English edition published by Carl Fischer in 1930, trans. from the 12th Russian ed. by Joseph Achron. Current English ed. by Nicholas Hopkins, New York, New York: C. Fischer, 2005.
- Principles of Orchestration. [Основы оркестровки.] Begun in 1873 and completed posthumously by Maximilian Steinberg in 1912, first published, in Russian, in 1922 ed. by Maximilian Steinberg. English trans. by Edward Agate; New York: Dover Publications, 1964 ("unabridged and corrected republication of the work first published by Edition russe de musique in 1922").
