= The Legend of the Invisible City of Kitezh and the Maiden Fevroniya =

Opera by Nikolai Rimsky-Korsakov

- Opera by Nikolai Rimsky-Korsakov
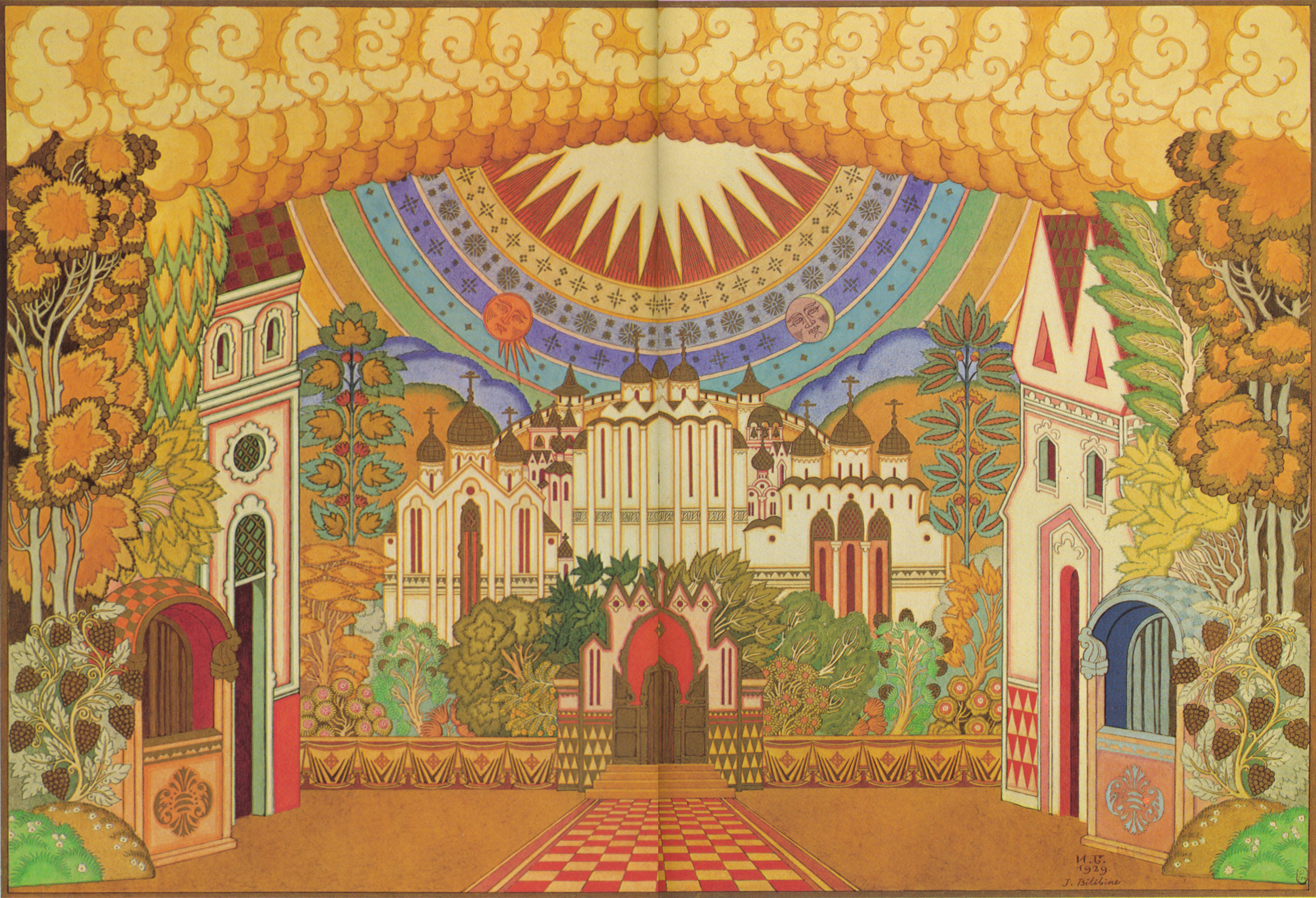
- Design for the Invisible City, 1909
- Native title: Russian: Сказание о невидимом граде Китеже и деве Февронии
- Librettist: Vladimir Belsky
- Language: Russian
- Based on: Russian legends
- Premiere: 20 February 1907; Mariinsky Theatre, St. Petersburg

The Legend of the Invisible City of Kitezh and the Maiden Fevroniya (Russian: Сказание о невидимом граде Китеже и деве Февронии, romanized: Skazániye o nevídimom gráde Kítezhe i déve Fevrónii) (Note: The BGN/PCGN system is used here. ALA-LC: Skazánie o nevídimom gráde Kítezhe i déve Fevrónii. ISO 9: Skazánie o nevídimom gráde Kíteže i déve Fevrónii. pronounced [skɐˈzanʲɪɪ̯ə ɐ‿nʲɪˈvʲidʲɪməm ˈɡradʲɪ ˈkʲitʲɪʐə i ˈdʲevʲɪ fʲɪˈvronʲɪɪ].) is an opera in four acts by Nikolai Rimsky-Korsakov. The libretto was written by Vladimir Belsky, and is based on a combination of two Russian legends: those of Saint Fevroniya of Murom and of the city of Kitezh, which became invisible when attacked by the Tatars. The opera was completed in 1905, and the premiere performance took place at the Mariinsky Theatre in St. Petersburg, on February 7, 1907, the last in Rimsky-Korsakov's lifetime.

== Composition history ==
Rimsky-Korsakov and Belsky first became interested in writing an opera on the Kitezh legend during the winter of 1898-1899, while they were working on the libretto to The Tale of Tsar Saltan. The idea of combining the legend of Saint Fevroniya of Murom into the story was part of the project from the beginning. The project remained in the minds of both composer and the librettist, but would have to wait until 1903 until serious work could begin. During the period between 1898 and the beginning of 1903, the composer was occupied with the composition of the operas The Tale of Tsar Saltan, Servilia, Kashchey the Immortal and Pan Voyevoda. In his My Musical Life, Rimsky-Korsakov mentions "In the midst of work on Pan Voyevoda Belsky and I pondered intensively the subject of The Tale of the Invisible City of Kityezh and of the Maiden Fyevroniya." Rimsky-Korsakov had written a rough draft of the first act by the end of summer, and Belsky had completed the libretto by spring. By summer of 1904, Rimsky-Korsakov had finished the composition of the second tableau of Act III and was orchestrating the opera. During the summer of 1905, while writing his Principles of Orchestration, Rimsky-Korsakov also polished the orchestral score to Kitezh, and made a clean final copy to send to the printers.

== Performance history ==
The world premiere was given in Saint Petersburg, Russia at the Mariinsky Theatre on 20 February (O.S. 7 February), 1907. The scenic designers were Konstantin Korovin and Apollinary Vasnetsov. A year later, the opera was given its premiere at the Bolshoy Theatre, Moscow, Russia on 15 February 1908. Scenic designers were Korovin, Klodt, Vasnetsov. The first performance out of Russia took place at Barcelona's Gran Teatre del Liceu, February 1926. In South America it was premiered at Buenos Aires's Teatro Colón in 1929. Earl V. Moore led the Chicago Symphony Orchestra in the U.S. premiere on May 21, 1932, at Hill Auditorium in Ann Arbor, Michigan. It was also performed in New York in 1995 at the Brooklyn Academy of Music (BAM) in a production that featured the orchestra, chorus, and soloists of the Kirov Opera, conducted by Artistic Director Valery Gergiev, and featuring soloist Galina Gorchakova. The first London performance, under Albert Coates, was a concert presentation in 1926. It was not performed in London again until 1994, when Gergiev and his Kirov Opera ensemble gave a performance, in concert again, at London's Barbican. The only staged performance in the UK took place at the Edinburgh Festival with the Kirov and Gergiev in 1995.

The Bregenz Festival presented it in 1995 in a production by Harry Kupfer conducted by Vladimir Fedoseyev with Elena Prokina as Fevroyniya, described by the Opera reviewer as "thrilling from start to finish".

== Roles ==
Role	Voice type	Premiere cast St Petersburg 20 February 1907 (Conductor: Feliks Blumenfeld)	Premiere cast Moscow 15 February 1908 (Conductor: Vyacheslav Suk)
Prince Yuriy Vsevolodovich	bass	Ivan Filippov	Vasily Rodionovich Petrov
Prince Vsevolod Yuryevich	tenor	Andrey Labinsky	Nikolay Rostovsky
Saint Fevroniya	soprano	Maria Kuznetsova-Benois	Nadezda Salina
Grishka Kuterma	tenor	Ivan Yershov	Anton Bonachich
Fyodor Poyarok	baritone	Vasiliy Sharonov	Georges Baklanoff
Page	mezzo-soprano	Maria Markovich	Elizaveta Azerskaya
Gusli player	bass	Vladimir Kastorsky	
Bear handler	tenor	Grigoriy Ugrinovich	
Lead-singer	baritone	Nikolay Markevitch	
Bedyay, a mighty Tatar warrior (might have Subutai as a prototype )	bass	Ivan Grigorovich	Khristofor Tolkachev
Burunday, a mighty Tatar warrior (might have Boroldai as a prototype)	bass	Konstantin Serebryakov	Stepan Trezvinsky
Sirin, bird of paradise	soprano	Nadezhda Zabela-Vrubel	
Alkonost, bird of paradise	contralto	Yevgeniya Zbruyeva	Serafima Sinitsina
Chorus, Silent roles: Well-off people, beggar community, people, Tatars

== Critical analysis ==
Kitezh is arguably Rimsky-Korsakov's finest opera, often being referred to as "the Russian Parsifal; however, it is not part of the standard operatic repertoire outside Russia. Stylistically, it is more representative of Rimsky-Korsakov's work than the better-known The Golden Cockerel. In its use of Russian history and legend, Oriental exoticism, and a mix of the real and the supernatural, the work has been called a "summation of the nationalistic operatic tradition of Glinka and The Five." Rimsky-Korsakov considered the work to be his final artistic statement, not planning to write another opera until unexpectedly inspired to write The Golden Cockerel as a satire of current political events in Russia. Although the composer often made use of fairy tale, Kitezh is the only one of his operas to make exclusive use of supernatural or religious themes. According to Simon Morrison, in spite of the Christian themes, "[t]his was a secular heaven."

== Synopsis ==
Time: Summer of the 6751st year of the creation of the world
Place: Unspecified location beyond the Volga River

=== Prelude ===
'Hymn to the Wilderness', an orchestral depiction of the scenery of forest wilderness.

=== Act 1 ===
Kerzhenskii Woods
These wild forests with dense thickets and bogs are the home of Fevronia (and her "brother", a treecreeper), who lives in a hut. She is besotted with dreams and poetical fancies, and is a daughter of nature, being on friendly terms with the birds and wild animals, and knowing all the mysteries of the forest. One day she meets a young prince in the forest, who has been hunting and has lost his way. He is Vsevolod, son of Prince Yuri of Kitezh, and he falls for her beauty, spiritual integrity and love of people and of nature. They sing a love duet, in which he places a ring on her finger, but this is interrupted by the sound of the hunting party from afar. He bids her farewell and goes to find the party, while she learns to whom she has become betrothed.

=== Act 2 ===
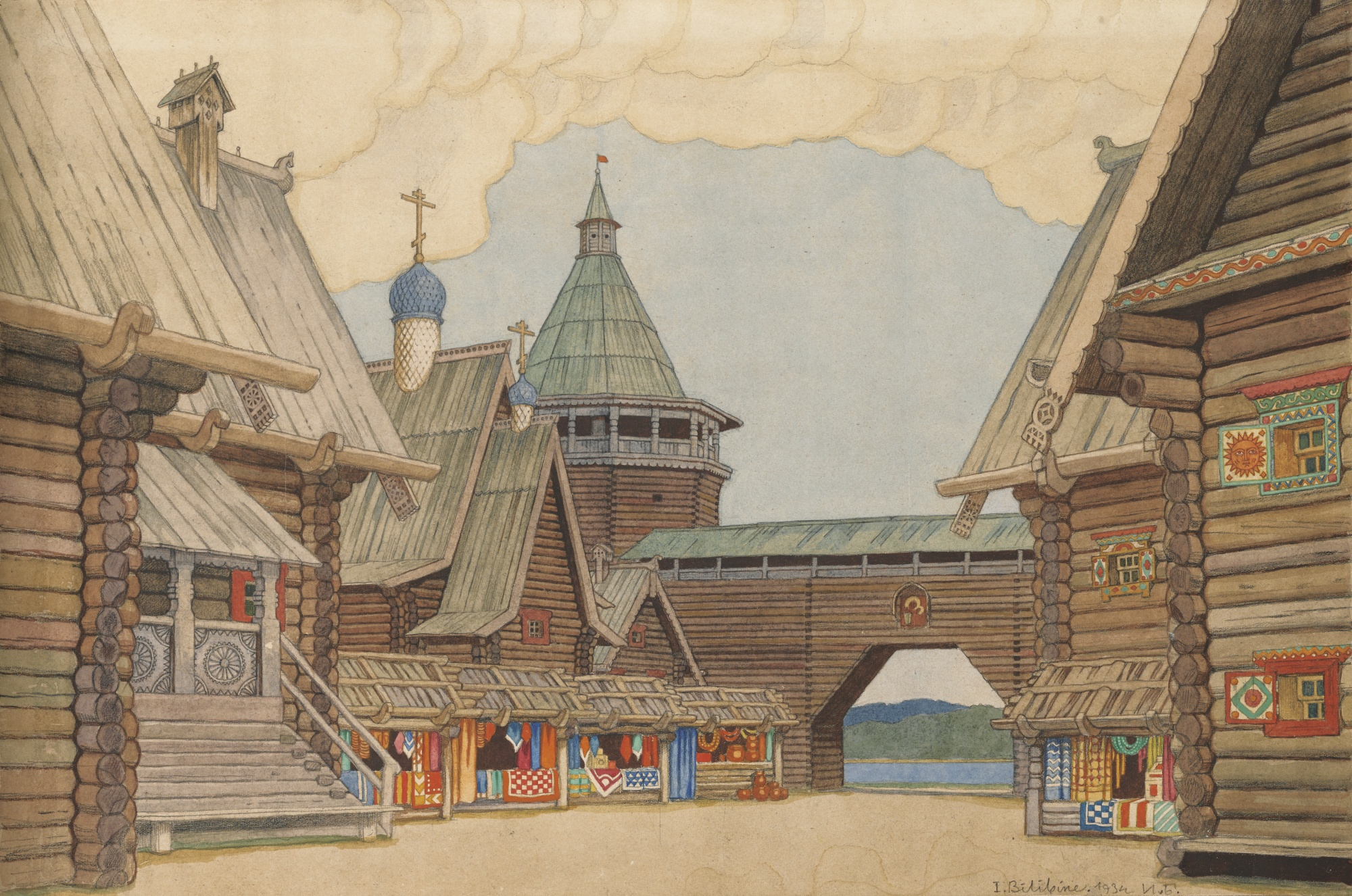
Little Kitezh

Little Kitezh on the Volga
Holiday festivities are going on in the market square in this place, because the wedding procession of Princess Fevronia is expected to come through. The people crowd around the buffoon and laugh at the bear's antics. An old psaltery-player comes and sings a solemn song. The rich townsfolk, who think Prince Vsevolod should have married a girl with better family connections, persuade Grishka Kuterma (the local drunkard) to mock the princess. The procession approaches to the sound of bells, and (in an old custom) the wedding guests throw honey-cakes, ribbons and coins into the crowd as the bride's 'ransom'. The people chase away Grishka and the procession takes up a wedding song.

Suddenly the merrymaking is interrupted as the town is surrounded by an army of invading Tatars. There is a sorrowful lamenting chorus of the people. Fevronia is captured by the Tatars and is racked by anxiety for the fate of her bridegroom and the city of Greater Kitezh, which the Tatars will attack next. Grishka agrees to betray Russia and to lead the Tatars to the city, while Fevronia prays that it be rendered invisible.

=== Act 3 ===
Scene 1 - Great Kitezh
Hearing of the invasion, the people of Greater Kitezh gather in the main square in arms, in dead of night. The prince's huntsman Fyodor Poyarok, whom the Tatars have blinded, tells them of the atrocities committed at Little Kitezh. A boy announces that the Tatars approach. The people prepare for battle, and the Prince leads a battalion which sings a chorus of resolution to fight to the end. Then, a golden fog rises over the Lake and shrouds the city, hiding it from the enemy: only the church bells drone faintly. A fierce battle breaks out on the banks of the river Kherzhenets. A symphonic interlude, composed around the battle-song theme and another representing the Tatar hordes, depicts the grim scene, and introduces:

Scene 2 - At the lake Svetlyi Iar
After a long trek through the wilderness, Grishka has led the Tatars to the edge of the lake. Unable to see the city for the fog, the Tatars accuse him of treachery and tie him to a tree, intending to kill him in the morning. They make fires and share out their loot. Two of the Tatar leaders, Burundai and Bedyai, quarrel over Fevronia and Bedyai is slain. The Tatars, preparing for night, sing a dismal song about ravens flocking to carnage. They sleep, and Fevronia is heard mourning Vsevolod, who has fallen in battle. Grishka, tormented by fear and remorse, begs her to release him, and she does so believing that kindness will heal his soul. But he is haunted by nightmares, in which the chimes of the Kitezh bells become distorted in his brain. He rushes to drown himself, but stops at the shore as the dawn shows that while the city remains invisible, the reflection of the city can be seen in the water, and the bells ring out ever louder. The Tatars are stricken with fear by the sight and disperse.

=== Act 4 ===
Scene 1 - Kerzhenskii Woods
In pitch darkness Fevronia and Grishka, exhausted, struggle through the wilderness. Grishka is delirious, and after singing a song about the devil and dancing wildly he runs off screaming. Fevronia is lulled to sleep by the sounds of the forest. In her dream the scene is transformed, with fantastic blossoming flowers, candles in the trees, and fairy songbirds. The mythical bird of sorrow, Alkonost, appears to tell her she must die. She welcomes death, and her prince appears to lead her to Kitezh. A second bird, Sirin, promises immortality. The enchantment comes out irresistibly in the Symphonic Interlude leading to:

Scene 2 - The Invisible City
The scene is in the legendary city of beautiful people with gracious hearts. Fevronia and Vsevolod, Prince Yuri and Fyodor Poyarok all reappear. Fevronia sends a message of hope to Grishka, telling him that one day he too will find the way to the Invisible City. Vsevolod leads his bride to the altar with wedding songs, and a Hymn of Joy, as a solemn chorus, ends the opera. Good, Love and Justice are victorious.

== Principal arias and numbers ==
Introduction: "Paean to the wilderness", «Похвала пустыне»

Act 1

Song: "Oh, my forest, beautiful wilderness" «Ах ты лес, мой лес, пустыня прекрасная» (Fevroniya)

Act 3

"Threnody": O vain illusion of glory and grandeur" (Prince Yuri)
Entr'acte: "The Battle of Kerzhenets", «Сеча при Керженце»

Act 4

Entr'acte: "Walking in the Invisible City" «Хождение в невидимый град»

== Recordings ==
Audio Recordings:

- 1955, Samuel Samosud (conductor) Choir and orchestra of the All-Union Radio. Alexander Vedernikov (Prince Yury), Vladimir Ivanovsky (Prince Vsevolod), Natalya Rozhdestvenskaya (Fevroniya), Dmitri Tarkhov (Grishka Kutyerma), Ilya Bogdanov (Fyodor Poyarok), Boris Dobrin (Balladeer), Lidia Melnikova (Youth), Leonid Ktitorov (Bedyay), Sergey Krasovsky (Burundai), Nina Kulagina (Alkonost).
- 1956, Vassili Nebolsin (conductor), Moscow Radio and Chorus, Ivan Petrov (Prince Yury), Vladimir Ivanovsky (Prince Vsevolod), Natalya Rozhdestvenskaya (Fevroniya), Dmitri Tarkhov (Grishka Kutyerma), Ilya Bogdanov (Fyodor Poyarok), Boris Dobrin (Balladeer), L. Melnikova (Youth), V. Shevtsov (Merchant I), Sergei Koltipin (Merchant II), Tikhon Chernyakov (Bear Handler), Mikhail Skazin (Beggar), Leonid Ktitorov (Bedyay), Boris Dobrin (Bard), Gennady Troitzky (Burundai), Mariya Zvenzdina (Sirin), Nina Kulagina (Alkonost). (USSR MK LPs set ТУ35, XП558-63, Д06489-Д06496). (CD box set with three discs issued in 2007 by Preiser Records.)
- 1986, Edward Downes (conductor), BBC Orchestra and Chorus, Malcolm King (Prince Yury), Howard Haskin (Prince Vsevolod), Kathryn Harries (Fevroniya), Anthony Roden (Grishka Kutyerma), Fiona Kimm (Youth). (Studio recording created for radio broadcast; never commercially released)
- 1983, Yevgeni Svetlanov (Conductor), Bolshoi Orchestra and Chorus, Alexander Verdernikov (Prince Yuri), Evgeni Raikov (Prince Vsevolod), Galina Kalinina (Fevronia), Vladislav Piavko (Grishka Kutyerma), Mikhail Maslov (Fypdor Poyarok). Recorded live at the Bolshoi Theatre December 25, 1983. Issued by Melodiya (LP); Le Chant du Monde (CD)
- 1983, Yevgeni Svetlanov (Conductor), Bolshoi Orchestra and Chorus, Yuri Stanfik (Prince Yuri), Pavel Kudryavchenko (Prince Vsevolod), Makvala Kasrashvili (Fevronia). Recorded live at the Bolshoi Theatre December 27, 1983. Issued by Melodia (LP only).
- 1994, Valery Gergiev (conductor), Kirov Orchestra and Chorus, Nikolay Okhotnikov (Prince Yury), Yury Marusin (Prince Vsevolod), Galina Gorchakova (Fevroniya), Vladimir Galouzine (Grishka Kutyerma), Nikolay Putilin (Fyodor Poyarok), Mikhail Kit (Gusli player), Olga Korzhenskaya (Page), Evgeny Boytsov, Evgeny Fyodorov (Merchants), Nikolay Gassiev (Bear Handler), Grigory Karasev (Beggar), Bulat Minjilkiev (Bedyay), Vladimir Ognovyenko (Burundai), Tatyana Kravtsova (Sirin), Larissa Diadkova (Alkonost). Live performance at the Rimsky-Korsakov Festival, February, 1994, St. Petersburg (Philips 462 225-2).
- 2010, Alexander Vedernikov (conductor), Orchestra e Coro del Teatro Lirico di Cagliari, Mikhail Kazakov (Prince Yury), Vitaly Panfilov (Prince Vsevolod), Tatiana Monogarova (Fevroniya), Mikhail Gubsky (Grishka Kutyerma), Gevorg Hakobyan (Fyodor Poyarok), Alexander Naumenko (Burunday), Valery Gilmanov (Bedyay).Live performance, May, 2008.(Naxos Records).

=== Video recordings ===
- 1995, Valery Gergiev, Conductor and artistic director. Recorded, Mar. 4, 1995, at Howard Gilman Opera House, Brooklyn Academy of Music, Brooklyn, N.Y. Galina Gorchakova (Fevronia), Vladimir Galusin (Prince Vsevolod Yurievich), Gennady Bezzubenkov (Prince Yuri Vsevolodovich), Konstantin Pluzhnikov (Grishka Kuterma), Nikolai Putilin (Fyodor Poyarok), Nikolai Gassiev (Man with the bear), Aleksandr Morozov (Gusliar), Mikhail Kit (Beggar singer), Yevgeny Boitsov, Yevgeny Fedotov (Nobles), Marianna Tarasova (Young boy), Vladimir Ognovenko (Burunday), Bulat Minzhilkiev (Bedyay), Larissa Diadkova (Alkonost), Marina Shaguch (Sirin). Stage director, Alexei Stepaniuk; set designer, Mart Kitaev; costume designer, Irina Cherednikova. DVD (https://worldcat.org/title/747992605 )
- 2011, Naxos Rights International, [Hong Kong]. Alexander Vedernikov, conductor. Mikhail Kazakov (Prince Yury Vsevolodovich); Vitaly Panfilov (hereditary prince Vsevolod Yuryevich); Tatiana Monogarova (Febronya); Mikhail Gubsky (Grishka Kuterma); Gevorg Hakobyan (Fyodor Poyarok); Alexander Naumenko (Burunday); supporting soloists; Orchestra e Coro del Teatro lirico di Cagliari. Recorded May 2, 4, 2008, Teatro lirico di Cagliari, Sardinia. DVD (https://worldcat.org/title/862726478)
- 2014, Opus Arte, [London]. Marc Albrecht, conductor. Vladimir Vaneev (Prince Yuri Vsevolodovich); Maxim Aksenov (Prince Vsevolod Yuryevich); Svetlana Ignatovich (Fevroniya); John Daszak (Grishka Kuterma); Alexey Markov (Fyodor Poyarok); Mayram Sokolova (page); Morschi Franz, Peter Arink (nobelmen); Gennady Bezzubenkov (gusli player); Hubert Francis (bear handler); Iurii Samoilov (singing beggar); Ante Jerkunica (Bedyay); Vladimir Ognovenko (Burunday); Jennifer Check (Sirin); Margarita Nekrasova (Alkonost); Chorus of De Nederlandse Opera; Netherlands Concert Choir; Netherlands Philharmonic Orchestra. Released on Blu-Ray (https://worldcat.org/title/1027967071 ) and DVD ( https://worldcat.org/title/945918641 ).
