= Nadezhda Zabela-Vrubel =

Russian opera singer (1868–1913)

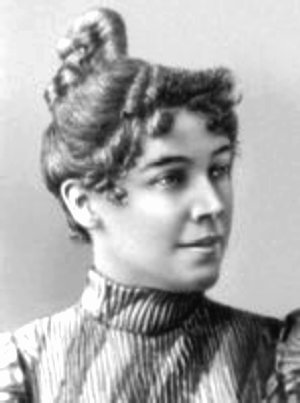
Nadezhda Ivanovna Zabela-Vrubel

Nadezhda Ivanovna Zabela-Vrubel (Russian: Надежда Ивановна Забела-Врубель 1 April [O.S. 20 March] 1868 in Kovno – 4 July [O.S. 21 June] 1913 in Saint Petersburg) was a Russian opera singer. She was the niece of the Russian sculptor Parmen Zabela. Vocally, she is best described as a coloratura soprano, with a particularly high tessitura.

== Life ==
In 1891, she graduated from the Saint Petersburg Conservatory, having been in the class of Natalia Iretskaya. She also studied in Paris with Mathilde Marchesi. She sang her debut in 1893 at the I. Setov operatic troupe in Kiev. In the season 1894–1895, she sang in Tiflis, in 1895–1896 in the St Petersburg Private opera, and in 1896–1897 in Kharkov. From 1897 to 1904, she was a leading soprano in Savva Mamontov's Private Russian Opera. In 1904–11 she became the soloist of the Mariinsky Theatre in St Petersburg.

In 1896, she married the Russian artist Mikhail Vrubel, who created a series of her portraits.

== Roles ==
Her roles include:

- Gorislava in Ruslan and Ludmila;
- Tatiana in Eugene Onegin;
- Maria in Mazeppa;
- Volkhova in Sadko;
- Swan Princess in The Tale of Tsar Saltan;
- Snegurochka in The Snow Maiden;
- Marfa in The Tsar's Bride;
- Princess in Kashchey the Deathless;
- Fevronia in Kitezh;
- Margarita in Faust;
- Nedda in Pagliacci;
- Desdemona in Otello, and many others.

== Gallery ==
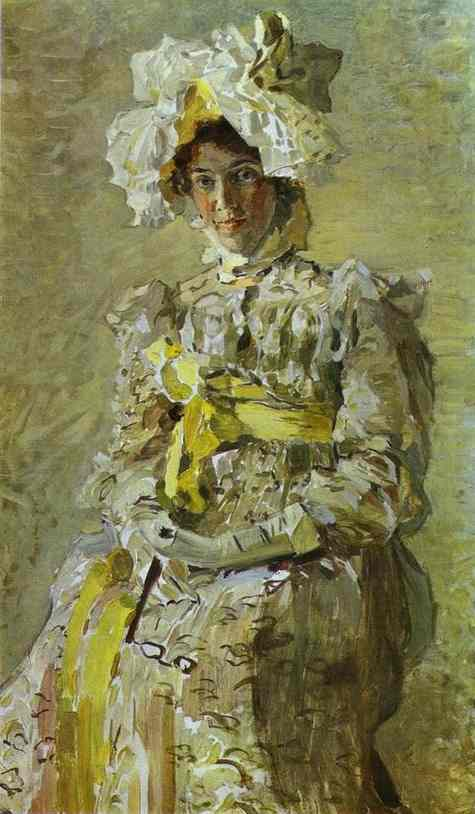
Mikhail Vrubel: Nadezhda Zabela-Vrubel – Artist's wife in a stage dress 1898

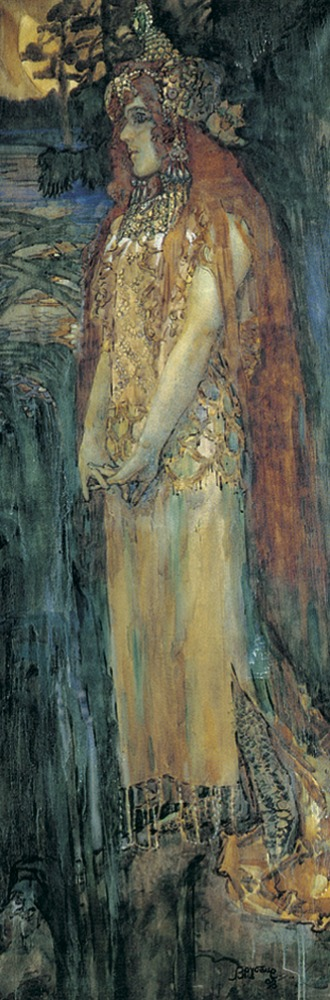
Mikhail Vrubel: Vrubel as Volkhova in Sadko, 1898

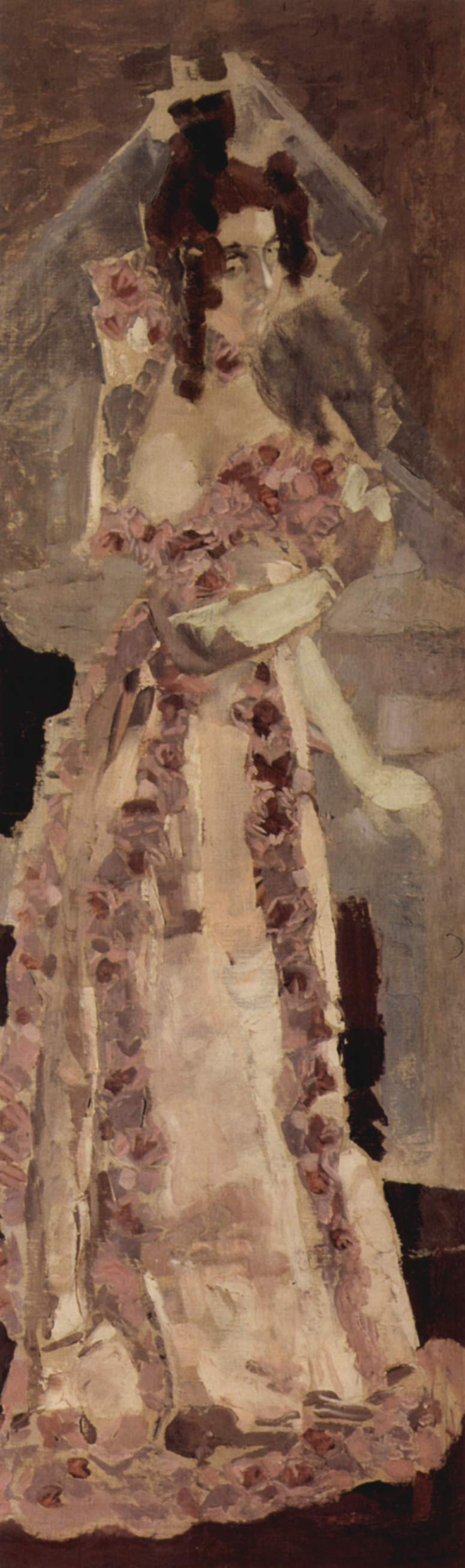
Mikhail Vrubel: Nadezhda Zabela-Vrubel – 1900

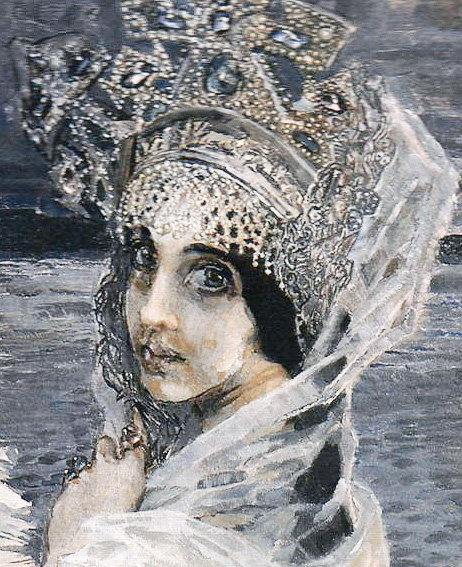
Mikhail Vrubel: Nadezhda Zabela-Vrubel – as the Swan Princess 1900

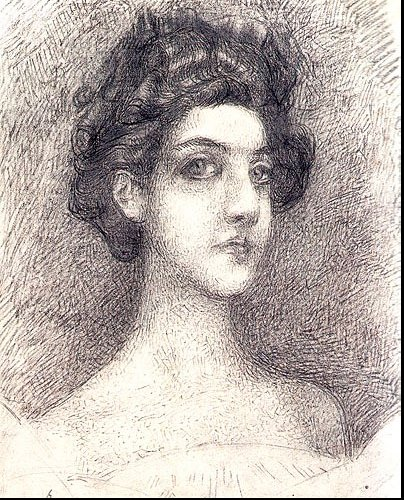
Mikhail Vrubel: Portrait of Nadezhda Zabela-Vrubel, 1904

== Quotations ==
- "Always so reasonable and sober-minded, Rimsky-Korsakov fell head over heels in love with Nadezhda. Marriage was out of the question, though, because he had a talented and very intelligent wife and growing up kids in St.Petersburg and Nadezhda was married to the outstanding Russian artist Mikhail Vrubel. For many years Nadezhda Zabela-Vrubel and her inimitable voice inspired the composer to write a whole constellation of beautiful arias that immortalized Rimsky-Korsakov’s name and also that of the woman he loved so much..." (Musical Tales)

== Bibliography ==
- Nikolai Rimsky-Korsakov – Pимский-Корсаков Н.А., Летопись моей музыкальной жизни, 7 изд., М., 1955 (in Russian)
- Rimsky-Korsakov, A. N. – Pимскии-Коpсаков А. Н., Н. А. Римский-Корсаков. Жизнь и творчество, вып. 4, М., 1937. с. 117-23, 153-70; (in Russian)
- Yankovsky, M.. – Янковский М., Н. И. Забела М.- Л., 1953. (in Russian)
