= Flight of the Bumblebee =

1900 orchestral interlude by Nikolai Rimsky-Korsakov

- Interlude by Nikolai Rimsky-Korsakov
- Native name: Полёт шмеля
- Key: A minor, B minor, F♯ minor
- Year: 1900
- Genre: Classical music

Premiere
- Date: 3 November 1900
- Location: Solodovnikov Theatre, Moscow

"Flight of the Bumblebee" (short version)
Performed by the US Army Band

"Flight of the Bumblebee" (Russian: Полёт шмеля) is an orchestral interlude written by Nikolai Rimsky-Korsakov for his opera The Tale of Tsar Saltan, composed in 1899–1900. This perpetuum mobile is intended to musically evoke the seemingly chaotic and rapidly changing flying pattern of a bumblebee. Despite the piece's being a rather incidental part of the opera, it is today one of the more familiar classical works because of its frequent use in popular culture.

The piece is recognizable for its frantic pace when played up to tempo, with nearly uninterrupted runs of chromatic sixteenth notes. This rapidity, measured at 144 beats per minute, evokes the skittish and frenetic activity of a bumblebee.

Because of the music's speed and complexity, it requires a great deal of skill to perform and is often chosen by musicians wishing to showcase their ability.

== Within the opera ==
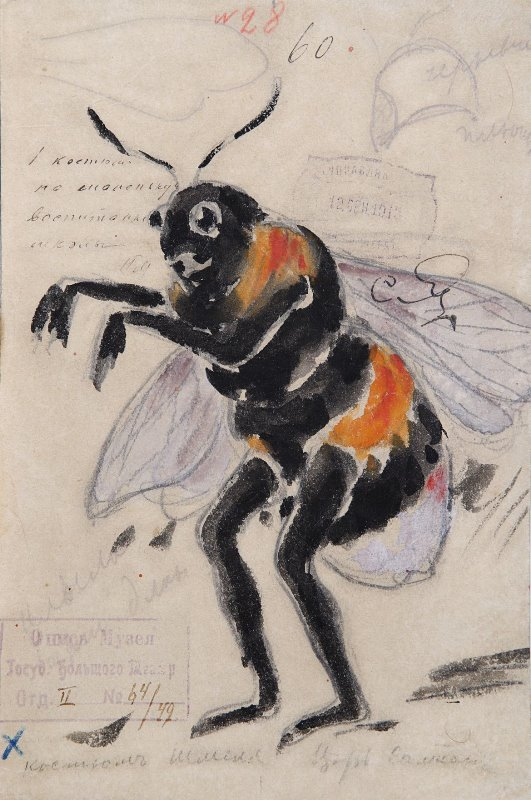
Costume design for Bumblebee for the opera The Tale of Tsar Saltan, 1913

The piece closes act 3, tableau 1, during which the magic Swan-Bird changes Prince Gvidon Saltanovich into an insect so that he can fly away to visit his father, the tsar.

Following is the text of the scene where the Swan-Bird sings during this music:

Russian
(Гвидон спускается с берега в море.
Из моря вылетает шмель,
кружась около Лебедь-Птицы.)
Лебедь-Птица:
Ну, теперь, мой шмель, гуляй,
судно в море догоняй,
потихоньку опускайся,
в щель подальше забивайся.
Будь здоров, Гвидон, лети,
только долго не гости!
(Шмель улетает.)

(Gvidon goes down from the shore into the sea.
Out from the sea flies a bumblebee,
whirling around the Swan-Bird.)
Swan-Bird:
Well, now, my bumblebee, go on a spree,
catch up with the ship on the sea,
go down secretly,
get deep into a crack.
Good luck, Gvidon, fly,
only do not stay long!
(The bumblebee flies away.)

== Reception ==
A bumblebee, bombus terrestris, in search of nectar

In 2021, researchers examined the enduring popularity of the piece by investigating its statistics within the musical service Spotify. They found that the piece was represented by more than 1000 different recordings. Among those recordings, the two most popular were performed by Columbia Symphony Orchestra in 1963, and London Symphony Orchestra in 2008. Between them, these two recordings had an audience of 8,000,000 listeners.
