= Kashchey the Deathless =

Opera by Nikolai Rimsky-Korsakov

- Opera by Nikolai Rimsky-Korsakov
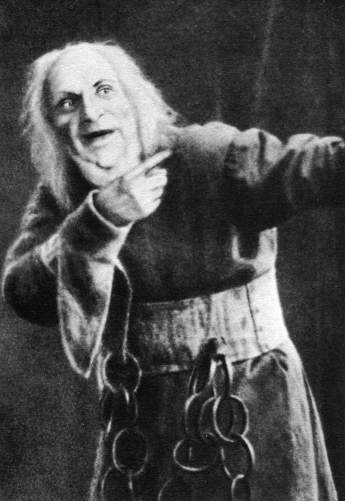
- Native title: Russian: Кащей бессмертный
- Librettist: Rimsky-Korsakov
- Language: Russian
- Based on: Koschei
- Premiere: 1902; Solodovnikov Theater in Moscow

Kashchey the Deathless (subtitle: A Little Autumn Fairy Tale) (Russian: Кащей бессмертный, romanized: Kashchéy bessmértny (Note: The BGN/PCGN system is used here. ALA-LC system: Kashchéĭ bessmértnyĭ. ISO 9: Kaŝéj bessmértnyj. pronounced [kɐˈɕːeɪ̯ bʲɪsːˈmʲertnɨɪ̯]), also known as Kashchey the Immortal) is a one-act opera in three scenes by Nikolai Rimsky-Korsakov. The libretto was written by the composer, (Note: Original librettist was Yevgeny Petrovsky, only later Rimsky-Korsakov took over his job and completed it all by himself. His daughter, Sofia Nikolayevna Rimskaya-Korsakova (1875—1943) also was credited as librettist. She died from starvation during the Siege of Leningrad, soon after the death of her daughter Lilya who had been deported from Leningrad following a false denunciation.) and is based on a Russian fairy tale about Koschei the Deathless, an evil, ugly old wizard, who menaced principally young women. Rimsky-Korsakov perceived it as 'an autumn tale' that is juxtaposed to his previous 'spring tale', The Snow Maiden. A similar fairy tale was also used by Igor Stravinsky (Rimsky-Korsakov's pupil) and Michel Fokine to create their iconic ballet, The Firebird.

The opera was composed during 1901–1902 and the work was completed in 1902. It was first performed the same year in Moscow.

== Performance history ==
The premiere took place on 25 December (O.S. 12 December) 1902 at the Solodovnikov Theater in Moscow. It was conducted by Mikhail Ippolitov-Ivanov with set designs by Sergey Malyutin.

The St. Petersburg premiere followed on 9 April (O.S. 27 March) 1905 and was given at the Komissarzhevskaya Drama Theatre performed by students of the St. Petersburg Conservatory and conducted by Alexander Glazunov.

Other important premieres took place in 1917 at the Bolshoi Theatre, Moscow, conducted by Emil Cooper; in 1919 in Petrograd at the Theatre of Opera and Ballet conducted by Khessin; in 1924 in Barcelona, given in Russian; and in 1928 in Salzburg, also given in Russian.

The United Kingdom premiere took place in 1994 (to celebrate the 150th anniversary of the composer's birthday). The work was given more recently in London, in concert performance on 5 September 2008.

The United States premiere, given in Russian, took place in January 2018, at Island City Opera in Alameda, California conducted by Lidiya Yankovskaya, directed by Richard Bogart.

The Australian premiere, sung in Russian, took place on 18 March 2018 in the Melbourne Recital Centre, Melbourne, Australia. Produced by CitiOpera, conducted by Alan Cook

== Roles ==
Role	Voice type	Premiere cast	
Role	Voice type	Moscow, 12 December 1902 (conductor: Mikhail Ippolitov-Ivanov)	St. Petersburg, 1905 (conductor: Alexander Glazunov)
Kashchey, The Immortal	tenor	Felix Oshustovich	A. Gurovich
Tsarevna, Princess Beloved Beauty	soprano	Nadezhda Zabela-Vrubel	K. Mayzels
Prince Ivan-Korolevich	baritone	Mikhail Bocharov	F. Pavlovsky
Kascheyevna, Daughter of Kashchey	mezzo-soprano	Vera Petrova-Zvantseva	N. Lezhen
Storm-Bogatyr, the wind	bass	Vasily Osipov	I. Pavlov
Offstage chorus: Invisible voices

=== Publication ===
The full score and vocal score were published by Bessel in 1902 and also in Rimsky-Korsakov's Complete Works, volumes 12 and 40, Muzgiz, Moscow 1954.

== Synopsis ==
Time: Unspecified
Places: Kashchey's Tsardom and Kashcheyevna's domain in Thrice-Tenth Tsardom, a far off place (beyond the thrice-nine lands) in Russian folklore.

=== Scene 1 ===
Kashchey's realm

The beautiful Tsarevna Beloved Beauty (Russian: Царевна Ненаглядная Краса), imprisoned by the evil wizard Kashchey the Deathless in his gloomy kingdom, longs for her beloved groom Ivan-Korolevich. She is upset when she looks into Kashchey's magic mirror and sees Ivan together with Kashcheyevna, the daughter of Kashchey. Kashchey is afraid that Ivan could discover the secret of his immortality and cause his death. He reveals that he hid his death in one of Kashcheyevna's tears: if she ever cries, Kashchey will be able to die. Fortunately for Kashchey, Kashcheyevna is hard and cold. Kashchey breaks the mirror and sends the Burya-Bogatyr (Storm Knight) to Kashcheyevna to ask how safely she keeps his death.

=== Scene 2 ===
Kashcheyevna's domain

Kashcheyevna prepares a magic potion to lull the Prince to sleep and force him to forget his beautiful Princess. She also whets her sword, planning to kill Ivan while he sleeps. When Ivan-Korolevich enters, she gives him the potion and tries to seduce him. He falls asleep and Kashcheyevna tries to strike his head off, but cannot do it. Burya-Bogatyr suddenly appears, awakening Ivan and ending Kashcheyevna's charm. Burya-Bogatyr also reveals that the Tsarevna is imprisoned in Kashchey's kingdom and that Kashcheyevna has something to do with preserving Kashchey's immortality. Ivan follows Burya-Bogatyr back to Kashchey's kingdom.

=== Scene 3 ===
Kashchey's realm

The Tsarevna sings a lullaby to Kashchey. Ivan arrives and attempts to free the Tsarevna. Kashcheyevna arrives and pleads with Ivan to go with her instead, since he is the first man to awaken love in her heart. Moved to compassion, the Tsarevna kisses Kashcheyevna, who begins to cry. Invisible voices announce the death of Kashchey. Kashcheyevna is turned into a weeping willow. Burya-Bogatyr opens the gates to show the lovers the way out of the gloomy kingdom, and into the world of light, spring, and love.

== Structure of the opera ==
Scene 1

1. Dni bez prosveta (Princess and Kashchey)
2. Ya vizhu devu krasoty chudesnoy (Princess, Kashchey and Burya-Bogatyr)
3. Temny yeyo ochi (Arioso of Kashchey)
4. Vy, gusli samogudy (Choir / Interlude)

Scene 2

5. Nastala noch (Arioso of Kashcheyevna)
6. Glukhaya noch (Scene and arietta of Ivan-Korolevich)
7. Pit'yo prokhladnoe (Duet of Kashcheyevna and Ivan-Korolevich)
8. Zasnul (Kashcheyevna, Ivan-Korolevich and Burya-Bogatyr)

Scene 3

9. Bayu, bay, Kashchey sedoy (The Lullaby of Princess)
10. Mereshchitsja (Duet of Princess and Ivan-Korolevich)
11. Prosti, lyubimy korolevich moy (Kashcheyevna, Princess, Ivan-Korolevich and Kashchey)
12. Konets zlomu tsarstvu (Final chorus)

== Recordings ==
Audio recordings (Mainly studio recordings)

- 1948, Samuil Samosud (conductor), Moscow Radio Chorus & Orchestra, Pavel Pontriagin (Kashchey), Varvara Gradova (Tsarevna), Antonina Kleshcheva (Kashcheyevna), Pavel Lisitsian (Ivan Korolevich), Konstantin Poliaev (Storm-Bogatyr)
- 1949, Samuil Samosud (conductor), Moscow Radio Chorus & Orchestra, Pavel Pontriagin (Kashchey), Natalya Rozhdestvenskaya (Tsarevna), Lyudmila Legostayeva (Kashcheyevna), Pavel Lisitsian (Ivan Korolevich), Konstantin Poliaev (Storm-Bogatyr)
- 1991, Andrey Chistyakov (conductor), Bolshoy Theatre Orchestra, Yurlov Academic Choir, Aleksandr Arkhipov (Kashchey), Irina Zhurina (Tsarevna), Nina Terentyeva (Kashcheyevna), Vladislav Verestnikov (Ivan Korolevich), Vladimir Matorin (Storm-Bogatyr)
- 1995, Valery Gergiev (conductor), Kirov Opera & Orchestra, Marina Shaguch (Tsarevna), Konstantin Pluzhnikov (Kashchey), Aleksandr Morozov (Storm-Bogatyr), Aleksandr Gergalov (Ivan Korolevich), Larisa Dyadkova (Kashcheyevna) (released in 1999 as Philips CD 446 704-2; reissued as part of Decca 11-CD set Rimsky-Korsakov: 5 Operas 478 2705 but without libretto or translation)

Video recordings

- 1987 Konstantin Pluzhnikov (Kashchei), Natalya Lapina (Kashcheyevna – actress), Elena Rubin (Kashcheyevna – singer), Alla Oding (Princess – actress), Sofia Yalysheva (Princess - singer), Valery Lebed (Prince Ivan Korolevich), Yuri Stoyanov (The Storm Knight – actor), Alexander Morozov (The Storm Knight – singer). Dmitri Shostakovich Symphony Orchestra of Leningrad, A. Trifonov
- 1991? Helikon Opera director Dmitry Bertmann, DVD of 1991 or 2003 production
