= Nadezhda Andreyevna =

Nadezhda Andreyevna may refer to:

- Nadezhda Andreyevna Durova (1783–1866), Russian female wartime cross-dresser
- Nadezhda Andreyevna Obukhova (1886–1961), Russian opera singer
- Nadezhda Andreyevna Tolokonnikova (born 1989), Russian political activist
