= Nadezhda Obukhova =

Russian opera singer (1886–1961)

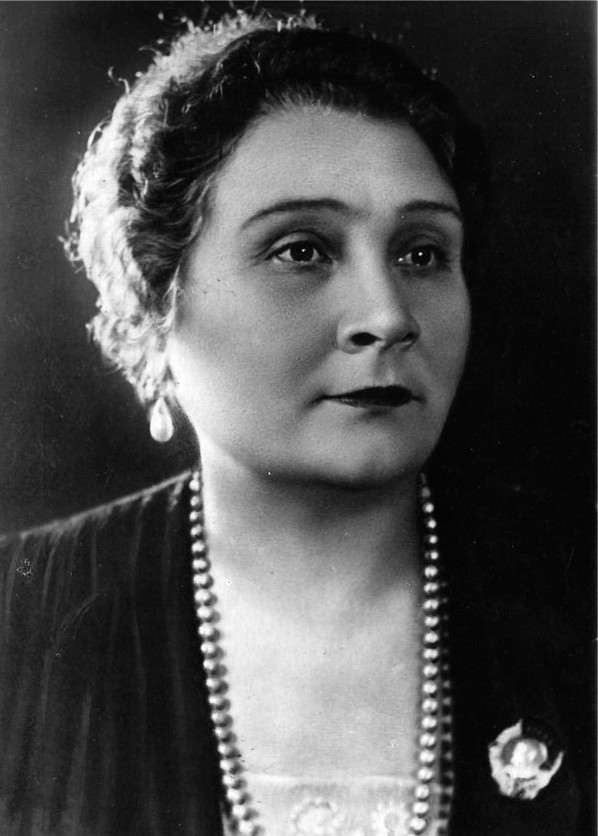
Nadezhda Obukhova

Nadezhda Andreyevna Obukhova (Russian: Наде́жда Андре́евна Обу́хова, 6 March 1886 – 14 August 1961) was a Russian and Soviet mezzo-soprano. She was awarded the title People's Artist of the USSR in 1937. Pianist Heinrich Neuhaus said that "he who even once hears her voice, will never forget it...". Asteroid 9914 Obukhova is named for her.

== Childhood ==
Obukhova was born in Moscow, and came from an artistic family. Two of her uncles were professional singers, one of whom was the opera director of the Bolshoi Theatre. Her grandfather Andrian Mazaraki was a noted pianist, and her great-grandfather Yevgeny Baratynsky was a poet of Pushkin circle.

Her family had some wealth, and would often spend summers in Nice, France, where Obukhova received her first singing lessons from Eleanora Lipman. In 1907, she was enrolled at the Moscow Conservatory, where she was instructed by Umberto Masetti.

== Career ==
After her graduation, she found work singing in various concerts around Russian Empire, but she did not make her operatic debut until 1916. Her operatic debut was in the role of Pauline in Tchaikovsky's The Queen of Spades at the Bolshoi. She quickly became a popular singer, appearing in a number of other productions including Carmen, Samson and Delilah (opera), The Tsar's Bride (as Marfa and as Lyubasha), The Snow Maiden, Der Ring des Nibelungen (as Fricka), Marina (by Emilio Arrieta), The Love for Three Oranges and Sadko.

She was a performer in the first radio concert in the Soviet Union, which took place in 1922. She sang Pauline's aria from The Queen of Spades. She gave other radio concerts, including the first broadcast from the Bolshoi Theatre, a production of The Tsar's Bride with Antonina Nezhdanova, Leonid Speransky and Vasily Petrov. Increasingly through the 1920s and 1930s, she began to incorporate popular songs into her concert repertoire. In 1937 she made her first studio recording, of pieces from The Queen of Spades.

Obukhova retired in 1943. After her retirement, she continued to give occasional concerts and radio performances. She died in Feodosia in the Crimea in August 1961, two months after giving her last concert.
