= Vladimir Belsky =

Russian opera librettist

Vladimir Ivanovich Belsky
- Владимир Иванович Бельский
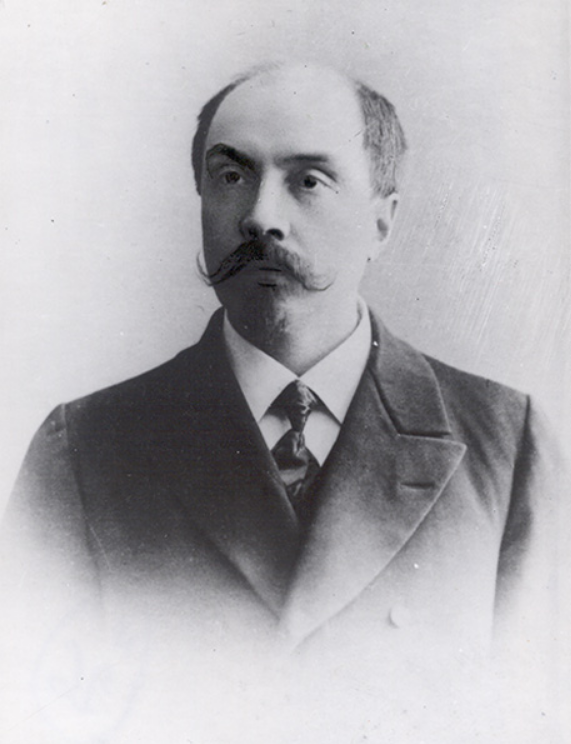
- Belsky, c. 1900
- Born: 14 April [O.S. 2 April] 1866; Trakai, Russian Empire
- Died: 28 February 1946 (aged 79); Heidelberg, Germany
- Education: Saint Petersburg Imperial University
- Occupations: Poet, librettist
- Years active: 1898-1909
- Notable work: Sadko (1898); The Tale of Tsar Saltan (1900); The Legend of the Invisible City of Kitezh and the Maiden Fevroniya (1907); The Golden Cockerel (1909)

Vladimir Ivanovich Belsky (Russian: Владимир Иванович Бельский; 14 April [O.S. 2 April] 1866 – 28 February 1946) was a Russian poet and opera librettist, known for his collaborations with the composer Nikolai Rimsky-Korsakov (1844-1908).

== Biography ==
Belsky was born in Trakai, Russian Empire (modern Lithuania) in 1866. Nothing seems to be known of his family or early life. He studied at Saint Petersburg Imperial University, where he was awarded degrees in law (1889), physics and mathematics (1893), and political economy and statistics (1897). In 1894, he and Rimsky-Korsakov became acquainted. They collaborated on four operas, all on fantastic or fairytale subjects: Sadko (1898; in part), The Tale of Tsar Saltan (1900), The Legend of the Invisible City of Kitezh and the Maiden Fevroniya (1907) and The Golden Cockerel (1909), and on several unrealised projects. Subsequently, he disappeared from public view. According to one account, he emigrated to Germany in the early 1920s, and lived there for the rest of his life. According to another, he emigrated in 1921 to Belgrade (then in the Kingdom of Yugoslavia), where he wrote, among other things, several memoirs and articles on Rimsky-Korsakov. All his papers were destroyed during the bombing of Belgrade in World War II. (Note: Belgrade was bombed twice during World War II: by the Germans in 1941 and by the Allies is 1944. It is unclear which of these events resulted in the destruction of Belsky's papers.) In 1946, he died in Heidelberg, Germany, in what was then the American Zone of Occupation following World War II.

He admired and was influenced by Pushkin, one of Russia's national poets. Rimsky-Korsakov described him as intelligent, educated and learned, a great connoisseur and lover of Russian antiquity and ancient Russian literature, epics and songs, and a humble, shy and honest man. He is said to have known fourteen languages.
