= The Tsar's Bride =

The Tsar's Bride (Russian: Царская невеста, romanized: Tsarskaja nevesta) is an historical verse drama in four acts by Lev Mei from 1849. Fifty years later Nikolai Rimsky-Korsakov used the play as the basis for his opera of the same name. As with Mei's other Russian historical drama, The Maid of Pskov (1859), this play is set in the time of Ivan the Terrible.

== Sources ==
- Golub, Spencer. 1998. "Russia and the Republics of the Former Soviet Union." In The Cambridge Guide to Theatre. Ed. Martin Banham. Cambridge: Cambridge UP. 948–956. ISBN 0-521-43437-8.
