= The Tsar's Bride (opera) =

Opera by Nikolai Rimsky-Korsakov

- Opera by Nikolai Rimsky-Korsakov
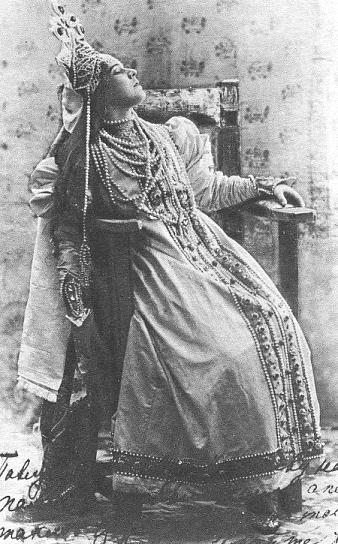
- The death of Marfa, Nadezhda Zabela-Vrubel in the premiere
- Native title: Russian: Царская невеста, Tsarskaya nevesta
- Librettist: Ilia Tyumenev
- Language: Russian
- Based on: The Tsar's Bride by Lev Mey
- Premiere: 1899; Private Opera Society, Moscow

The Tsar's Bride (Russian: Царская невеста, romanized: Tsarskaya nevesta) is an opera in four acts by Nikolai Rimsky-Korsakov. The libretto, by Ilia Tyumenev, is based on the drama of the same name by Lev Mey. Mey's play was first suggested to the composer as an opera subject in 1868 by Mily Balakirev. (Alexander Borodin, too, once toyed with the idea.) However, the opera was not composed until thirty years later, in 1898. The first performance of the opera took place in 1899 at the Moscow theater of the Private Opera of Savva Mamontov.

Rimsky-Korsakov himself said of the opera that he intended it as a reaction against the ideas of Richard Wagner, and to be in the style of "cantilena par excellence".

The Tsar's Bride is part of the opera repertoire in Russia but not in the West.

== Performance history ==
The Moscow premiere was given at the Private Opera Society, the scenic designer being Mikhail Vrubel. St. Petersburg had its premiere two years later at the Mariinsky Theatre with scenic designs by Ivanov and Lambin. Another notable performance was at the Bolshoy Theatre in Moscow, conducted by Emil Cooper (Kuper) and with scenic design by Konstantin Korovin, Golova, and Dyachkov. A film version was released in 1966 directed by Vladimir Gorikker.

One noted US production was in 1986 at Washington Opera. The Royal Opera premiere was given at Covent Garden in 2011, directed by Paul Curran, with set and costume design by Kevin Knight and lighting design by David Jacques.

== Roles ==
| Role | Voice type | Premiere cast Moscow 3 November (O.S. 22 October) 1899 (Conductor: Mikhail Ippolitov-Ivanov) | Premiere cast St. Petersburg 11 November (O.S. 30 October) 1901 (Conductor: Eduard Nápravník) | Premiere cast Moscow 1916 (Conductor: Feliks Blumenfeld) | Premiere cast London 14 April 2011 (Conductor: Mark Elder) |
|---|---|---|---|---|---|
| Vasily Stepanovich Sobakin, Novgorodian merchant (Note: Both the Skuratovs and the Saburovs (Domna Ivanovna), the latter was of the same origin as the future royal House of Godunov (the same as in Boris Godunov), were prominent real-life noble families of that time. Their surnames' status was changed from 'boyar' into 'merchant' by Rimsky-Korsakov himself because of the obvious Romanovs-era censorship precautions reasons. The historical Sobakins, a noble family, also became boyars because of the two-week-long marriage of the historical Marta to the tsar. That exact time period was characterized by the ruthless antagonism between oprichnina and boyars.) | bass | Nikolay Mutin | Lev Sibiryakov | Vasily Rodionovich Petrov | Paata Burchuladze |
| Marfa, his daughter | soprano | Nadezhda Zabela-Vrubel | Adelaida Bolska | Antonina Nezhdanova | Marina Poplavskaya |
| Grigory Gryaznoy, an oprichnik | baritone | Nikolay Shevelyov | Ioakim Tartakov | Leonid Savransky | Johan Reuter |
| Malyuta Skuratov, an oprichnik | bass | Tarasov | Aleksandr Antonovsky | Platon Tsesevich | Alexander Vinogradov |
| Boyar Ivan Sergeyevich Lïkov | tenor | Anton Sekar-Rozhansky | Fyodor Oreshkevich | Mikhail Kurzhiyamsky | Dmitry Popov |
| Lyubasha | mezzo-soprano | Aleksandra Rostovtseva | Mariya Slavina | Pavlova | Ekaterina Gubanova |
| Yelisey Bomeliy, the Tsar's physician | tenor | Vasily Shkafer | Daverin-Kravchenko | Fyodor Ernst | Vasily Gorshkov |
| Domna Ivanovna Saburova, a merchant woman | soprano | Sofiya Gladkaya (Lila Kedrova's mother) | Sofiya Gladkaya | | Elizabeth Woollett |
| Dunyasha, her daughter, Marfa's girlfriend | mezzo-soprano | Varvara Strakhova | Yuliya Yunosova | Konkordiya Antarova | Jurgita Adamonyte |
| Petrovna, the Sobakins' housekeeper | mezzo-soprano | Varvara Kharitonova | | | Anne-Marie Owens |
| The Tsar's stoker | bass | | | | |
| A maiden | mezzo-soprano | | | | |
| A young lad | tenor | | | | |
Chorus, silent roles: Two distinguished horsemen, riders, oprichniki, male and female choristers, dancers, boyars and boyarïnyas, maidens, servants, people.

== Synopsis ==
Time: Autumn, 1572
Place: Aleksandrovsky settlement, Moscow, Russia

=== Act 1: The Feast ===
The Oprichnik Gryaznoi loves Marfa, daughter of the merchant Sobakin, even though Gryaznoi already has a mistress, Lyubasha, whom he has neglected of late. Marfa is already betrothed to the boyar Lykov. In a jealous rage against Lykov, Gryaznoi arranges to cast a spell on Marfa with a magic potion from Bomelius, the Tsar's physician. Lyubasha has overheard Gryaznoi's request.

=== Act 2: The Love Philtre ===
Lyubasha in turn obtains from Bomelius another magic potion with which to cancel any feelings of Gryaznoi for Marfa. Bomelius consents, but at the price of an assignation with Lyubasha for himself.

=== Act 3: The Best Man ===
In the meantime, the Tsar of the title, Ivan IV (known as "Ivan the Terrible"), is looking for a new bride from the best aristocratic maidens in Russia, through the newly adopted custom of bride-show. The Tsar settles upon Marfa. At the celebration of the engagement of Marfa to Lykov, everyone is surprised when the news arrives of the Tsar's choice of Marfa as his bride. Gryaznoi had slipped what he thought was the love potion from Bomelius into Marfa's drink at the feast.

=== Act 4: The Bride ===
At the Tsar's palace, Marfa has become violently ill. Lykov has been executed, at the instigation of Gryaznoi, on charges of attempting to kill Marfa. When Marfa learns that Lykov is dead, she goes insane. Eventually, Gryaznoi admits that he had slipped a potion into her drink, and after learning that it was poisonous, asks that he himself be executed. Lyubasha then confesses that she had substituted her potion from Bomelius for Gryaznoi's. In a rage, Gryaznoi murders Lyubasha, and is then taken to prison eventually to be executed. In her madness, Marfa mistakes Gryaznoi for Lykov, inviting him to return the next day to visit her, then dies.

== Important musical excerpts ==
- Overture
- Gryaznoy's Recitative and Aria (Act I)
- Lyubasha's Song (Act I)
- Lyubasha's Arioso (Act 1)
- Lykov's Aria (Act I)
- Marfa's Aria (Act II)
- Marfa's Aria (Act IV)

== Recordings ==
Audio

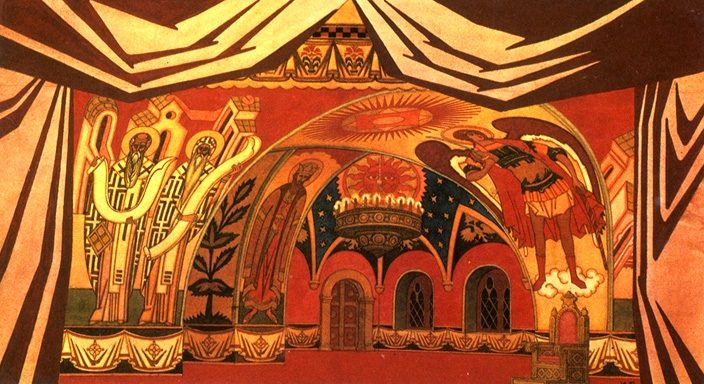
A 1930 stage design by Ivan Bilibin

- 1943: Maxim Mikhailov (Sobakin), Natalya Shpiller (Marfa), Pyotr Medvedev (Gryaznoy), Anatoly Orfenov (Lykov), Maria Maksakova (Lyubasha), Sofya Panova (Domna Saburova); Chorus and Orchestra of the Bolshoi Theatre; Lev Steinberg, conductor; Dante Productions LYS 055/56:
- 1954: Boris Gmyria (Sobakin), Elizaveta Chavdar (Marfa), Mikhail Grishko (Gryaznoy), Pyotr Belinnik (Lykov), Larisa Rudenko (Lyubasha), Vera Lyubimova (Domna Saburova); Kiev Opera Chorus and Orchestra; Vladimir Piradov, conductor
- 1958: Alexander Vedernikov (Sobakin), Elizaveta Shumskaya (Marfa), Alexey Ivanov (Gryaznoy), Andrey Sokolov (Lykov), Veronika Borisenko (Lyubasha), Tatyana Tugarinova (Domna Subarova); Chorus and Orchestra of the Bolshoi Theatre; Yevgeny Svetlanov, conductor
- 1975: Yevgeny Nesterenko (Sobakin), Galina Vishnevskaya (Marfa), Vladimir Valaitis (Gryaznoy), Vladimir Atlantov (Lykov), Irina Arkhipova (Lyubasha), Eleonora Andreeva (Domna Saburova); Chorus and Orchestra of the Bolshoi Theatre; Fuat Mansurov, conductor.
- 1991: Pyotr Gluboky (Sobakin), Ekaterina Kudriavchenko (Marfa), Vladislav Verestnikov (Gryaznoy), Arkady Mishenskin (Lykov), Nina Terentieva (Lyubasha), Irina Udalova (Domna Saburova); Sveshnikov Academic Russian Choir and Orchestra of the Bolshoi Theatre; Andrey Chistiakov, conductor
- 1998: Gennady Bezzubenkov (Sobakin), Marina Shaguch (Marfa), Dmitri Hvorostovsky (Gryaznoy), Evgeny Akimov (Lykov), Olga Borodina (Lyubasha), Irina Loskutova (Domna Saburova); Orchestra and Chorus of the Mariinsky Theatre; Valery Gergiev, conductor. Philips 462 618-2:

Video

- 1983: Alexander Vedernikov (Sobakin), Lydia Kovaleva (Marfa), Yuri Grigoriev (Gryaznoy), Evgeny Shapin (Lykov), Nina Terentieva (Lyubasha), Larissa Yurchenko (Domna Saburova); Orchestra and Chorus of the Bolshoi Theatre; Yuri Simonov, conductor.
