= Galina Gorchakova =

Russian singer

Galina Vladimirovna Gorchakova (Russian: Галина Владимировна Горчакова, born 1 March 1962) is a distinguished Russian lyric soprano.

== Beginnings ==
Gorchakova was born in Novokuznetsk to a musical family. She moved to Novosibirsk in Siberia with her parents who were singers at the opera house there. It was in that city that she attended music school, college and the Conservatoire from which she graduated in 1988. While she was there, she was auditioned for the opera company of Sverdlovsk and transferred there as a leading soprano. After a period, she became dissatisfied and asked to audition at the Mariinsky Theatre in St Petersburg. Artistic director Valery Gergiev invited her to join the company as a guest artist and she sang Il trovatore and Prince Igor.

== The Fiery Angel ==
She was asked to learn the role of Renata in Prokofiev's The Fiery Angel for Sir Edward Downes who was auditioning singers for a joint production of the opera for Covent Garden and the Mariinsky. She won the role which became her breakthrough role, and with which she made her Western debut at the 1991 Proms in London. She also sang the role the following year at the Royal Opera House and this was a triumph for her. International success in the same role followed in Milan, New York, San Francisco. It was only after her international acclaim that she was offered a permanent position at the Mariinsky theatre.

== Repertoire ==
She has also sung in many other key Russian operas: Tatiana in Eugene Onegin, Lisa in The Queen of Spades, Iolanta, Mazeppa, Ruslan and Lyudmila. The Maid of Pskov and Fevroniya in The Invisible City of Kitezh.

She has also sung the Italian repertoire, Cio-Cio San in Madama Butterfly the opera in which she made her Metropolitan Opera debut in 1995, Aida, Elisabeth de Valois in Don Carlo, the Leonoras in Il trovatore and La forza del destino, Tosca, and Norma.

== Valery Gergiev ==
Although Gergiev played a key role in her early success and despite the many performances and recordings in which she has sung under his baton, both at the Mariinsky and on tour, Gorchakova has spoken harshly of his arrogant attitude towards her and other Russian singers and of what she perceives as attempts by him to stop her international career as payback for her leaving the Mariinsky.

She was a prize-winner in the Mussorgsky and Glinka competitions. She is a People's Artist of the USSR.

She was married, but is now divorced and has a son.

== Sources ==
- Official website Galina Gorchakova.
- Holland, Bernard, A Russian Cio-Cio San Plays Down Vulnerability, New York Times, 7 January 1995
- Marques, Nuno Miguel, Vissi d'arte. Vissi d'amore - An Interview with Russian soprano Galina Gorchakova, Classical Voice
- Mermelstein, David, Three More Reasons To Hail a New Russia, New York Times 20 December 1998
- Robinson, Harlow, Into the West, Opera News, April 1997
- Warrack, John Hamilton and West, Ewan (eds.), "Gorchakova, Galina", The Concise Oxford Dictionary of Opera, 3rd Edition, Oxford University Press, 1996, pp. 204–205. ISBN 0-19-280028-0
