= The Tale of Tsar Saltan (opera) =

Opera by Nikolai Rimsky-Korsakov

- Opera by Nikolai Rimsky-Korsakov
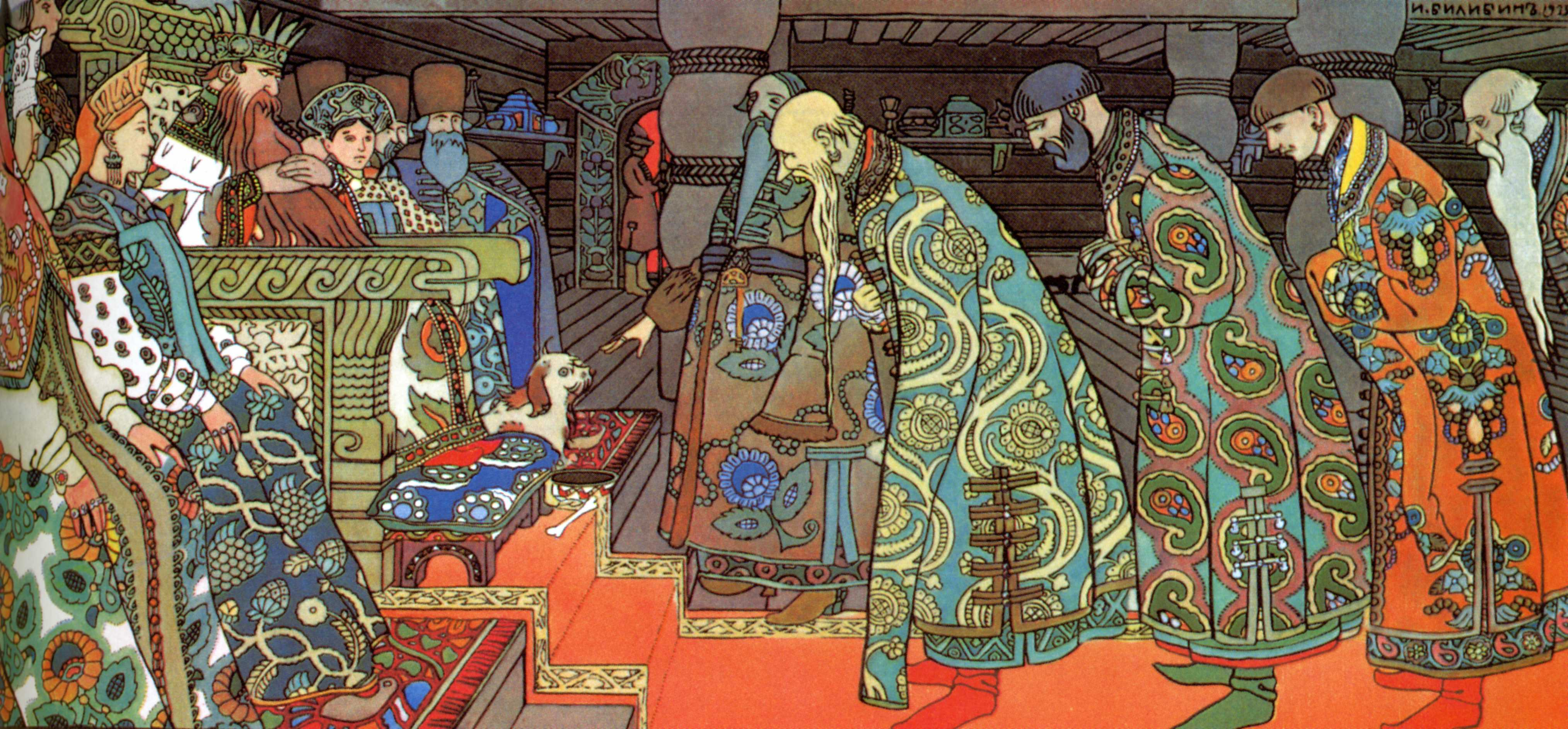
- The Merchants visit Tsar Saltan (Act 3), illustration of Pushkin's poem by Ivan Bilibin who would later provide designs for premieres by Rimsky-Korsakov
- Native title: Russian: Сказка о царе Салтане (Skazka o Tsare Saltane)
- Librettist: Vladimir Belsky
- Language: Russian
- Based on: The Tale of Tsar Saltan by Aleksandr Pushkin
- Premiere: 3 November 1900; Solodovnikov Theatre, Moscow

The Tale of Tsar Saltan (Russian: Сказка о царе Салтане, romanized: Skazka o Tsare Saltane) is an opera in four acts with a prologue (a total of seven scenes) by Nikolai Rimsky-Korsakov. The libretto was written by Vladimir Belsky, and is based on the 1831 poem of the same name by Aleksandr Pushkin. The opera was composed in 1899–1900 to coincide with Pushkin's centenary, and was first performed in 1900 in Moscow, Russia.

The best known piece featured in the opera is the instrumental interlude Flight of the Bumblebee, frequently performed as a stand-alone concert piece.

The lengthy full title of both the opera and the poem is The Tale of Tsar Saltan, of his Son the Renowned and Mighty Bogatyr Prince Gvidon Saltanovich and of the Beautiful Princess-Swan (Russian: Сказка о царе Салтане, о сыне его славном и могучем богатыре князе Гвидоне Салтановиче и о прекрасной царевне Лебеди Skazka o tsare Saltane, o syne yego slavnom i moguchem bogatyre knyaze Gvidone Saltanoviche i o prekrasnoy tsarevne Lebedi).

== Composition history ==
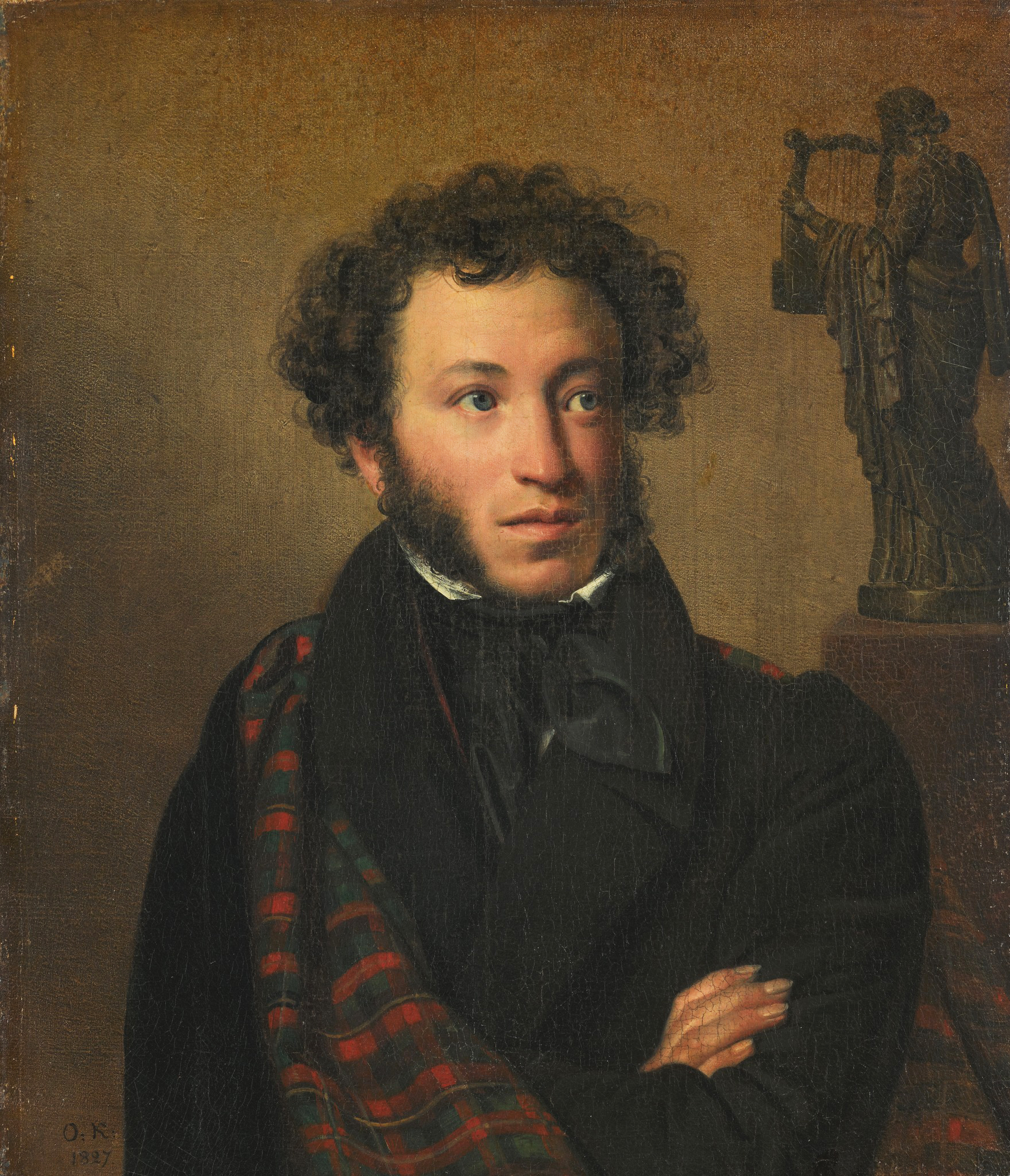
Aleksandr Pushkin (1799–1837)

The plot of the opera generally follows that of Pushkin's fairy-tale poem, with the addition of some characters, some expansion (particularly for Act 1), and some compression (mostly by reducing Gvidon's three separate trips to one). The libretto by Belsky borrows many lines from and largely emulates the style of Pushkin's poem, which is written in couplets of trochaic tetrameter. The music is composed in the manner of Rimsky-Korsakov's operas after Snowmaiden, i.e., having a more or less continuous musical texture throughout a tableau system, broken up here and there by song-like passages.

== Performance history ==
The première was held in Moscow on 3 November (O.S. 21 October) 1900 at the Solodovnikov Theatre conducted by Mikhail Ippolitov-Ivanov with scenic design by Mikhail Vrubel.

The St. Petersburg premiere took place in 1902 at the St. Petersburg Conservatory, conducted by Zelyonïy.

Other notable performances included those in 1906 at the Zimin Opera, Moscow, conducted by Ippolitov-Ivanov; 1913 at the Bolshoy Theatre in Moscow, conducted by Emil Cooper, with scenic design by Konstantin Korovin; and 1915 at the Mariinsky Theatre in St. Petersburg, conducted by Albert Coates, with scenic design by Korovin and Aleksandr Golovin.

On 14 September [O.S. 1 September] 1911, while he was attending a performance of the opera at the Kiev Opera House in the presence of the Tsar and his family, the Russian Prime Minister Pyotr Stolypin was shot twice, once in the arm and once in the chest, dying two days later; his assassin, Dmitri Bogrov, was both a leftist radical and an agent of the Okhrana.

The French premiere was of the suite on 12 November 1911 in Paris during the Concerts Lamoureux at the Salle Gaveau, under the baton of Camille Chevillard.

The UK premiere took place in London on 11 October 1933 at Sadler's Wells Theatre and the US premiere was presented on 27 December 1937 under the title of The Bumble-Bee Prince.

In April 1987 four complete performances of the opera were presented in a fully staged English-language production at Indiana University Bloomington.

== Roles ==
Role	Voice type	Première cast Moscow 3 November 1900 (O.S. 21 October), (Conductor: Mikhail Ippolitov-Ivanov)	Première cast St. Petersburg 1902 (Conductor: Zelyonïy)
Tsar Saltan (Saltán)	bass	Nikolay Mutin	Grigoriy Pirogov
Tsaritsa Militrisa	soprano	Yelena Tsvetkova	Leonida Balanovskaya
Tkachikha (Weaver), middle sister	mezzo-soprano	Aleksandra Rostovtseva	Olga Pavlova
Povarikha (Cook), older sister	soprano	Adelaida Veretennikova	Margarita Gukova
Babarikha (Old Woman), an in-law	contralto	Varvara Strakhova	Nina Pravdina
Tsarevich Gvidon (Gvidón)	tenor	Anton Sekar-Rozhansky	Fyodor Oreshkevich
Tsarevna Swan-Bird (Lyebyed)	coloratura soprano	Nadezhda Zabela-Vrubel	Yelena Stepanova, Antonina Nezhdanova
Old man	tenor	Vasily Shkafer	Konstantin Arsenyev
Messenger	baritone	Nikolay Shevelyov	Leonid Savransky
Skomorokh (Jester)	bass	Mikhail Levandovsky	Ivan Disnenko
Three sailors	tenor, baritone and bass		
Chorus, silent roles: Voices of a sorcerer and spirits, Boyars, boyarïnyas, courtiers, nurses, clerks, guards, soldiers, sailors, astrologers, runners, singers, servant men and women, male and female dancers, and people, Thirty-three knights of the sea with master Chernomor, Squirrel, Bumblebee.

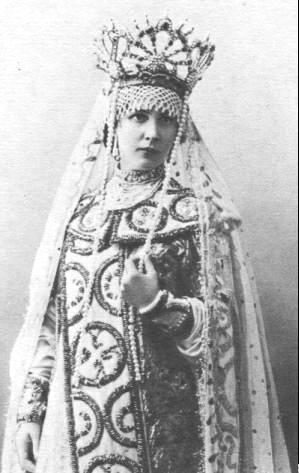
Yelena Tsvetkova as Militrisa (Russian Private Opera, Moscow, 1900)

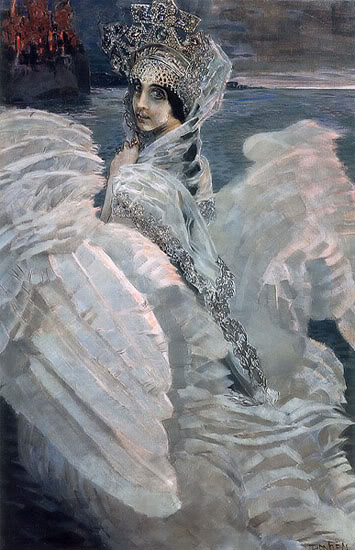
Nadezhda Zabela-Vrubel as Tsarevna Swan-Bird. Portrait by Mikhail Vrubel

== Synopsis ==
Time: Unspecified
Place: Partly in the city of Tmutarakan and partly on the island of Buyan

=== Prologue ===
On a wintry evening three sisters are sitting at spinning wheels. As Tsar Saltan overhears from outside the door, the oldest sister boasts that, if she were Tsaritsa (the bride of the Tsar), she would prepare a sumptuous feast; the middle sister would weave a grand linen; the youngest promises to bear, as son for the Tsar, a bogatyr (warrior-knight). Saltan enters, chooses the third sister, Militrisa, to be his bride ("Zdravstvuy, krasnaya devitsa!" = "Greetings, beautiful girl!"), and takes her away. The old woman Babarikha devises a revenge for the two jealous older sisters ("Nu, tak slushat, ne meshat" = "Then listen well and don’t interrupt"): when the Tsar is away at war, a message will be sent to him that the child born to his Tsaritsa is not human, but a monster.

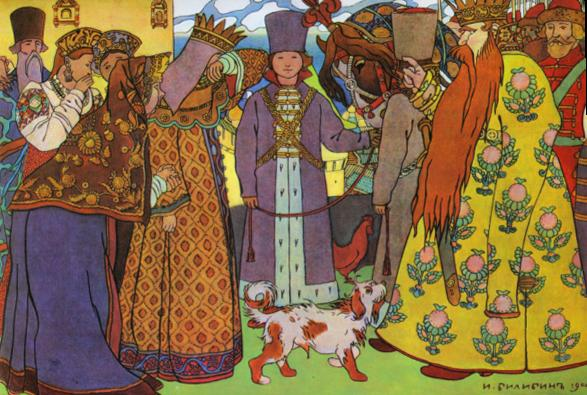
The Tsar's departure and farewell, by the Russian artist Ivan Bilibin (1905), corresponds to the Introduction to Act 1, and the first movement of Rimsky-Korsakov's suite from the opera (1903).

=== Act 1 ===
Introduction — Saltan’s Departure

Scene

The Tsar has gone off to war saying goodbye. In his palace in Tmutarakan, the Tsaritsa has given birth to a son, to whom a chorus of nannies sings a lullaby ("Bayushki, bayushki!"). She is despondent: there is no reply from her husband to the news of the birth of their child. Her sisters are (with Babarikha) now part of the court: the older sister as Cook, and the middle sister as Weaver. They have secretly replaced the message of the Tsaritsa to her husband with news of her son's birth with another message: it said that she has borne neither a daughter nor a son, neither a mouse nor a frog, but a kind of monster. They try to entertain her, as does the skomorokh (jester) and the old man ("Gosudarynya, tsaritsa, matushka" = "Your highness, queen, mother"). But all this is to no avail. The young Tsarevich baby, who has been lulled to sleep during this scene, awakens and runs about, accompanied by his nurses, and the people wish God's blessings upon him. Then a messenger stumbles in, having been waylaid with drink by Babarikha. He sings "Gosudarynya moya, ne veli kaznit menya" ("Your highness, don’t punish me"), and his message from the Tsar is read by the scribes: the Tsaritsa and her progeny must be placed in a barrel and thrown into the sea. Reluctantly the people carry out the Tsar's command.

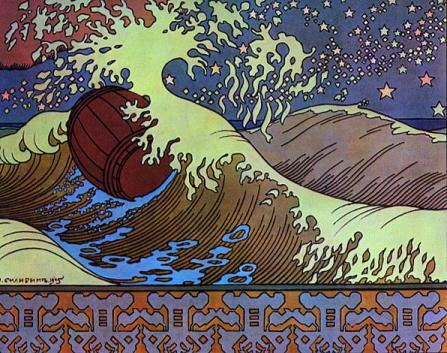
The Tsaritsa and her son afloat in the barrel, by Bilibin, corresponds to the Introduction to Act 2, and the second movement of Rimsky-Korsakov's suite from the opera.

=== Act 2 ===
Introduction — Militrisa and Gvidon Afloat In the Barrel

Scene

The Tsaritsa and her son Gvidon have landed on the island of Buyan, and broken out of the barrel in which they were trapped. Gvidon, who has grown remarkably rapidly into a young man, is searching for sustenance. While doing this, he rescues a swan from being killed by a kite. in gratitude, the Swan-Bird sings to him ("Ty, tsarevich, moy spasitel" = "You, Prince, my Saviour"). The Tsaritsa explains Gvidon's early history to her son, and the Swan-Bird causes the city of Ledenets (Russian: Леденец, "lollipop", from Russian: лёд, "ice") to arise magically on the island. Gvidon is hailed by its inhabitants as its Prince.

=== Act 3 ===
Scene 1

By the shore of Buyan, the merchant ships have left, and Gvidon laments having been separated from his father ("Veter po moryu gulyayet" = "The wind blows over the sea"). The Swan-Bird will help him by changing him into a bumblebee. He will be able to fly over the sea, as a stowaway on Saltan's ship, to visit him (incognito) in Tmutarakan.

Interlude — Flight of the Bumblebee

Scene 2

The sailors arrive at Tmutarakan from their visit to Buyan. The sailors tell Tsar Saltan of the wonders of Gvidon's island (the magically appearing city itself, a magic squirrel, and the thirty-three bogatyrs from the sea). The two older sisters are concerned that the Tsar will become interested in visiting the island, and they try to dissuade him. In retaliation the bumble-bee Gvidon stings each of them in the brow. Babarikha then tries to trump the sailors, by speaking of a fabulous Princess on the sea, at which point Gvidon stings her in the eye and blinds her. Saltan decides to visit the island, but, in view of the havoc caused by the bumblebee, forbids that breed of insect from ever entering the palace again.

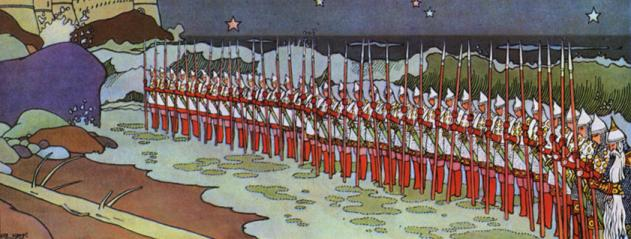
Chernomor and the thirty-three bogatīrs, by Bilibin, corresponds to the Introduction to Act 4, Scene 2, and to the second of the "Three Wonders" depicted in the third movement of Rimsky-Korsakov's suite.

=== Act 4 ===
Scene 1

Gvidon, again by the seashore of Buyan, longs for a bride ("V sinem more zvyozdy bleshchut" = "Over the blue sea stars shine"). The Swan-Bird appears, and Gvidon tells her of the Princess that he heard about at Tmutarakan. The Swan-Bird transforms herself into that very Princess. His mother and a chorus of maidens enter, and bless the prospect of their wedding.

Orchestral interlude — Three Wonders

Scene 2

Gvidon, with his mother hidden, awaits the arrival of Saltan. When the ship arrives with the Tsar and his retinue, Gvidon greets him, and questions him as to whether or not he will have a son to carry on his work. The Saltan does not yet know that Gvidon is his son ("Akh, moguchiy knyaz Gvidon" = "Ah, mighty Prince Gvidon"), and expresses regret for his rash treatment of his wife many years earlier. Although Gvidon tries to cheer him up with the three wonders, it becomes clear that only the presence of Militrisa can assuage Saltan's guilt. The Princess-Swan (Lyebyed) appears and reveals the Tsar's long-lost wife. The older sisters beg forgiveness, which in his happiness Saltan grants. Everyone then joins in a celebration of the upcoming wedding of Gvidon and the Princess-Swan.

== Libretto ==
A link to the Russian-English libretto with transliteration: https://drive.google.com/file/d/11ntEkzioh5moBRUyT_6qZ9ZKqMkTgZqY/view?usp=sharing

== Principal orchestral numbers and concert excerpts ==
Act 1

Introduction–"The Tsar's Departure And Farewell"

Act 2

Introduction–"The Tsaritsa and Her Son Afloat in the Barrel"

Flight of the Bumblebee
Flight of the Bumblebee performed by US Army Band

Act 3

"Flight of the Bumblebee", heard frequently in concert.

Act 4

Introduction to Scene 2–"The Three Wonders" - a major concert piece.

Suite from the Opera The Tale of Tsar Saltan, Op. 57 (1903)

Сюита из оперы Сказка о царе Салтане, соч. 57

1. Introduction to Act I: "The Tsar's Departure And Farewell"
2. Introduction to Act II: "The Tsaritsa and Her Son Afloat in the Barrel"
3. Introduction to Act IV, Tableau 2: "The Three Wonders" («Три чуда»)

The "Flight of the Bumblebee" is also performed in various arrangements at concerts and recitals, but is not part of the Suite.

== Gallery of illustrations ==
Ivan Bilibin made the following illustrations for Pushkin's tale in 1905. Bilibin would later provide designs for the premieres of Rimsky-Korsakov's version of Boris Godunov (1908), and The Golden Cockerel (1909). The "Flight of the mosquito" episode was not included in the opera by Rimsky-Korsakov (nor that of the fly) for the sake of brevity, but Bilibin's illustration otherwise corresponds to the "Flight of the Bumblebee" from Act 3.

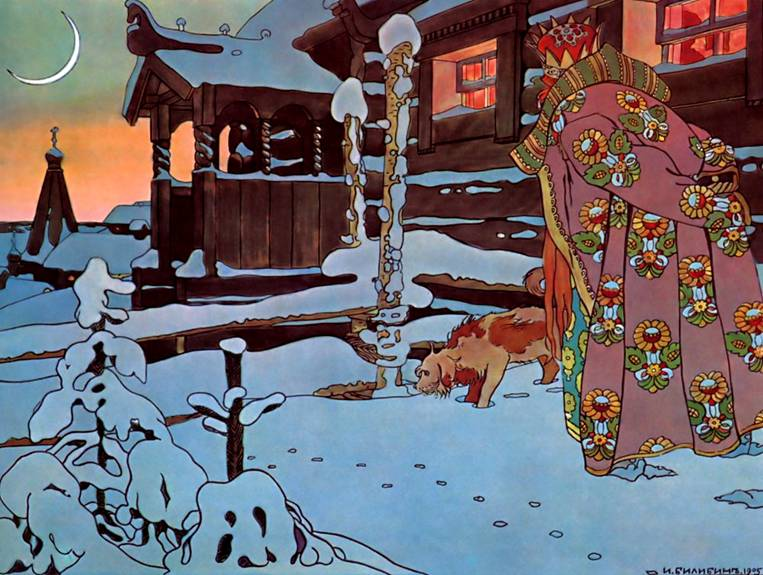
Tsar Saltan at the window (Prologue)

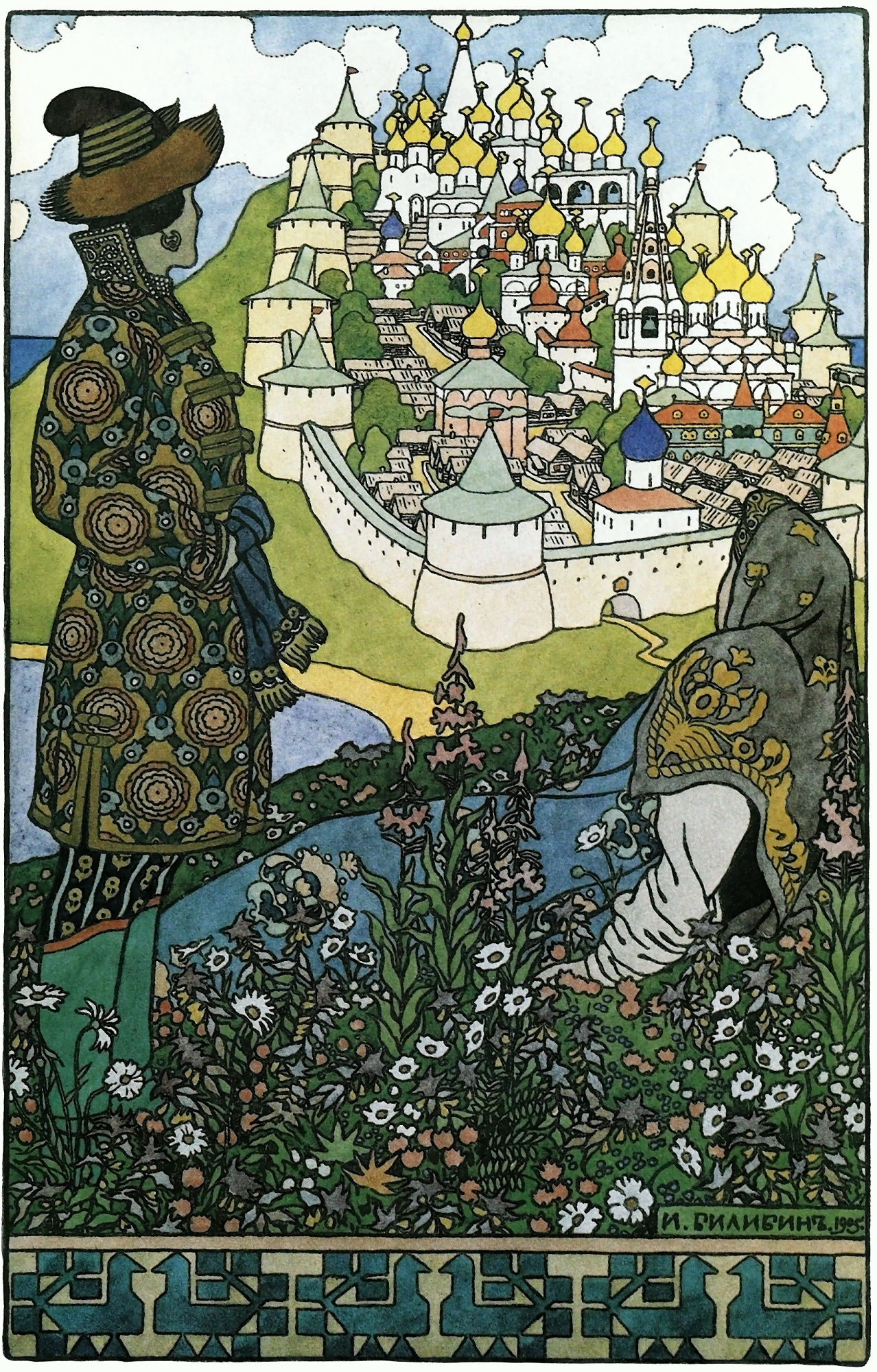
The island of Buyan (Act 2)

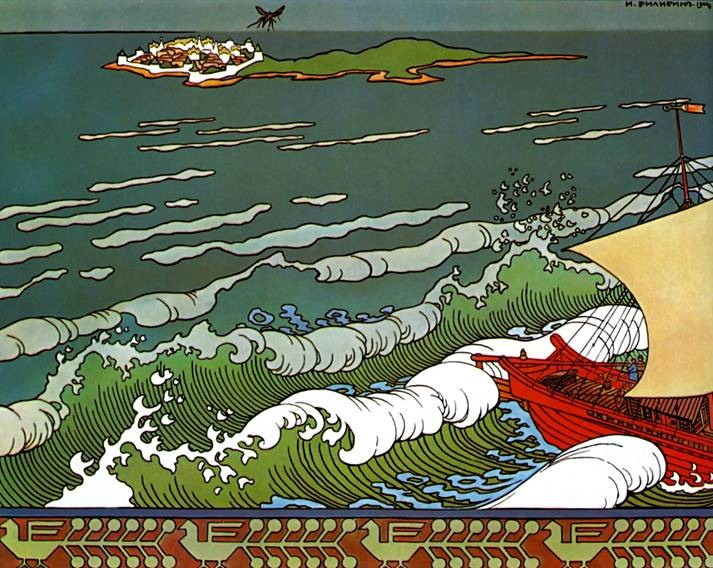
Flight of the mosquito
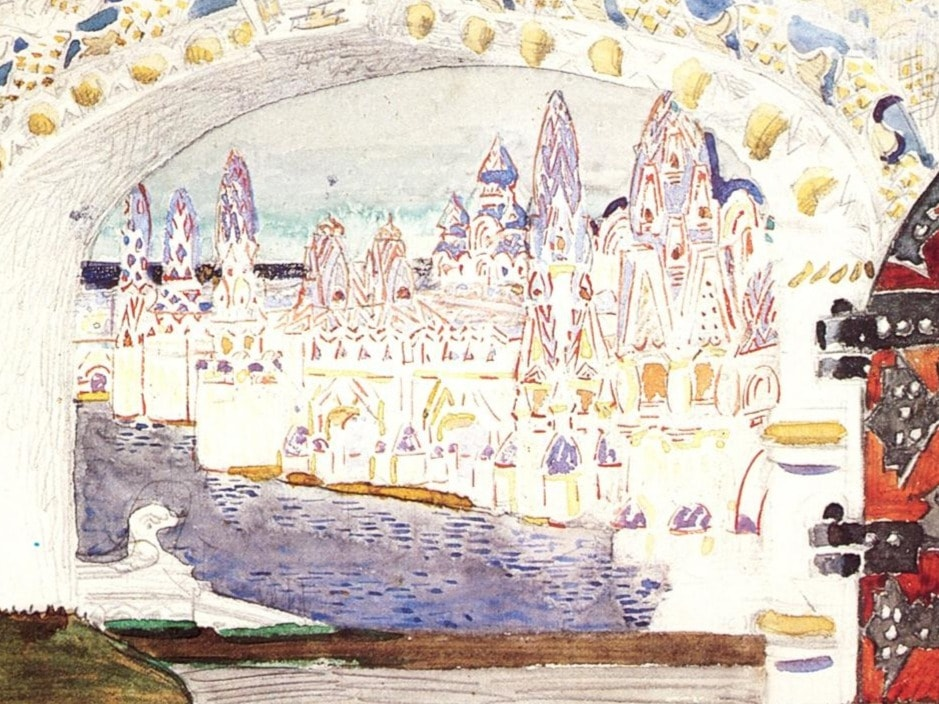
Ledenets by Mikhail Vrubel, set design art, 1900

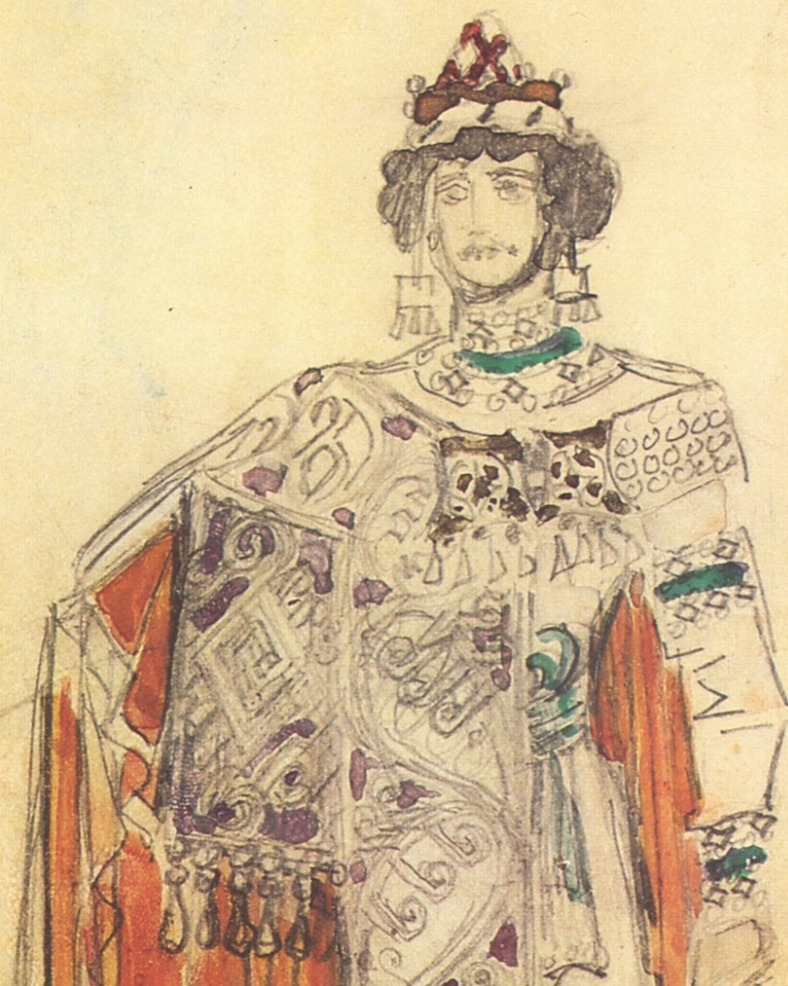
Tsarevich Gvidon by Mikhail Vrubel, costume design art, 1900

== Recordings ==
Audio Recordings (Mainly studio recordings) Source: www.operadis-opera-discography.org.uk

- The Tale of Tsar Saltan – 1959, Vasily Nebolsin (conductor), Bolshoy Theatre Orchestra and Chorus, Ivan Petrov (Tsar Saltan), Evgeniya Smolenskaya (Tsaritsa Militrisa), Larisa Nikitina (Tkachikha), Yelizaveta Shumilova (Povarikha), Evgeniya Verbitskaya (Babarikha), Vladimir Ivanovsky (Tsarevich Gvidon), Galina Oleinichenko (Tsarevna Swan-bird)
- The Tale of Tsar Saltan – Albina Shagimuratova as the Swan-Princess; Irina Churilova, as Tsaritsa Militrisa, Edward Tsanga as the Tsar, Mikhail Vekua as Prince Guidon, Elena Vitman as the matchmaker Babarikha, Varvara Solovyova as the Weaver, Irina Vasilieva as the cook. Mariinsky Orchestra & Chorus, Valery Gergiev 2016 recording; Blu-ray/DVD 2017
