= The Snow Maiden =

Opera by Nikolai Rimsky-Korsakov

- Opera by Nikolai Rimsky-Korsakov
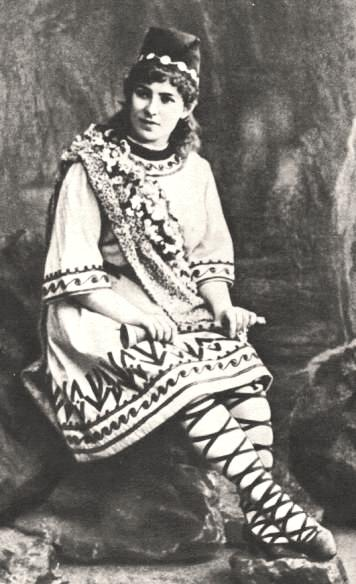
- Yevgeniya Zbruyeva as Lel at the Bolshoy Theatre, Moscow (1894)
- Native title: Russian: Снегурочка–Весенняя сказка, romanized: Snegurotchka Vesennyaya Skazka
- Librettist: Nikolai Rimsky-Korsakov
- Language: Russian
- Based on: The Snow Maiden by Alexander Ostrovsky
- Premiere: 29 January 1882; Mariinsky Theatre, Saint Petersburg

The Snow Maiden: A Spring Fairy Tale (Russian: Снегурочка–весенняя сказка, romanized: Snegurochka–vesennyaya skazka) is an opera in four acts with a prologue by Nikolai Rimsky-Korsakov, composed during 1880–1881. The Russian libretto, by the composer, is based on the like-named play by Alexander Ostrovsky (which had premiered in 1873 with incidental music by Tchaikovsky).

The first performance of Rimsky-Korsakov's opera took place at the Mariinsky Theatre, Saint Petersburg on 10 February [O.S. 29 January] 1882 conducted by Eduard Nápravník. By 1898 it was revised in the edition known today. It remained the composer's own favorite work.

== Analysis ==
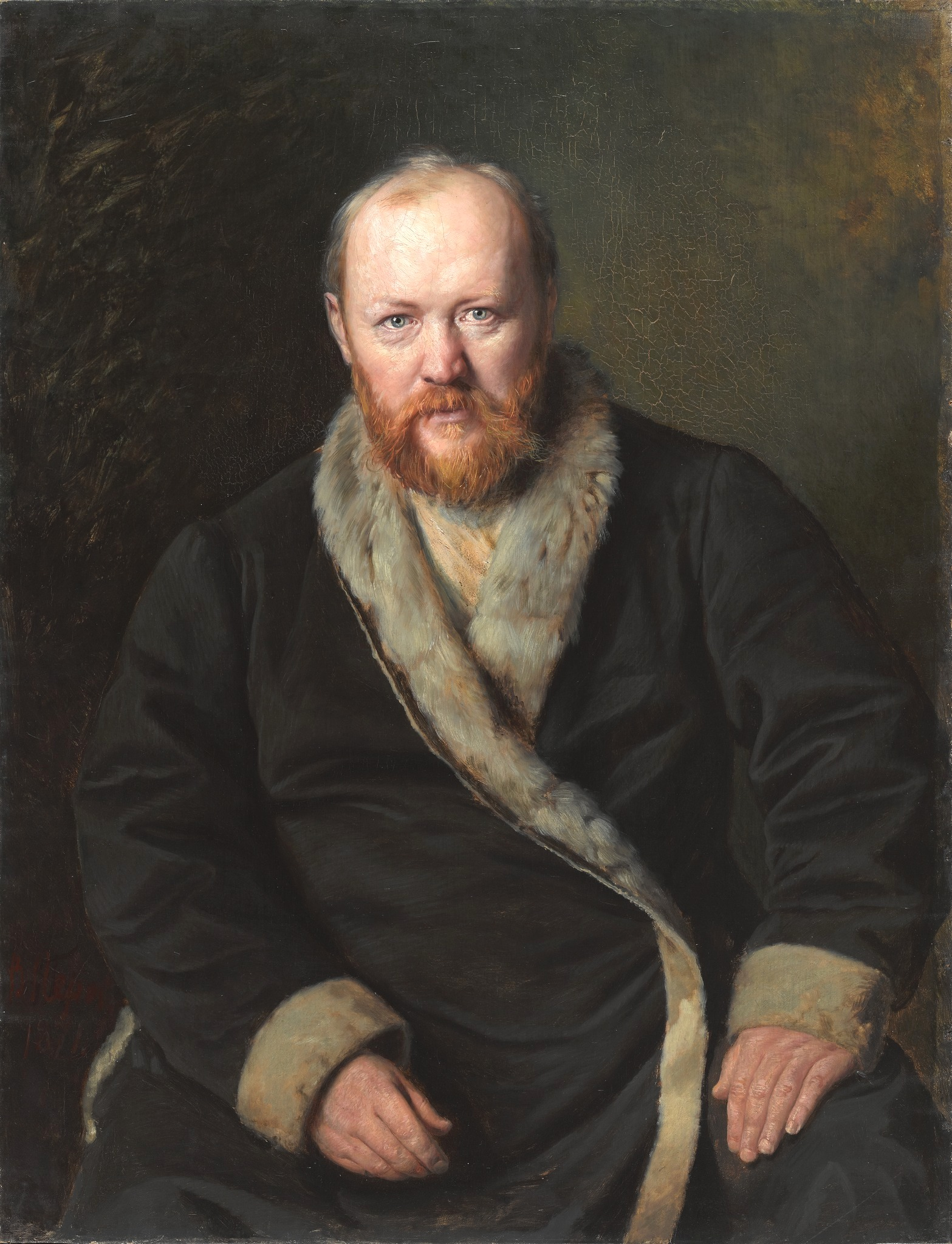
Aleksandr Ostrovsky (1823–1886) wrote the drama The Snow Maiden in 1873.

The story deals with the opposition of eternal forces of nature and involves the interactions of mythological characters (Frost, Spring, Wood-Sprite), real people (Kupava, Mizgir), and those in between, half-mythical, half-real (Snow Maiden, Lel, Berendey). The composer strove to distinguish each group of characters musically, and several individual characters have their own associated leitmotifs. In addition to these distinctions, Rimsky-Korsakov characterised the townspeople particularly with folk melodies. For a deeper understanding of this work from the composer's point of view, the reader is directed to his autobiography, as well as to his own incomplete analysis of the opera from 1905.

== Performance history ==
The Moscow premiere followed that of St. Petersburg three years later in 1885. It was presented by the Russian Private Opera (the Opera of Savva Mamontov in Moscow), conducted by Enrico Bevignani with scenic Design by Viktor Vasnetsov, Isaak Levitan, and Konstantin Korovin; Tsar Berendey – Grigoriy Erchov, Bermyata – Anton Bedlevitch, Spring Beauty – Vera Gnucheva, Grandfather Frost – Stepan Vlasov, The Snow Maiden – Nadejda Salina, Bobyl Bakula – G. Kassilov or Nikolay Miller, Lel – Tatyana Liubatovitch, Mizgir – Mikhail Malinin (Boris Mikhailovich Malinin and Marina Raskova's father), Second Herald – M.Skuratovskiy.

The Bolshoi Theatre in Moscow presented the opera in 1893.

The U.S. premiere was held 23 January 1922 at the Metropolitan Opera, conducted by Artur Bodanzky, directed by Samuel Thewman, designed by Boris Anisfeld, and with Lucrezia Bori in the title role, sung in French.

In March 2014, University College Opera presented a new English translation of The Snowmaiden in the Bloomsbury Theatre.

== Roles ==
Role	Voice type	St. Petersburg premiere, 10 February 1882 (Conductor: Eduard Nápravník)	Bolshoi theatre premiere, Moscow 1893 (Conductor: Enrico Bevignani)
Tsar Berendey	tenor	Mikhail Vasilyev (Vasilyev III)	Anton Bartsal
Bermyata, a boyar, confidant of the tsar	bass	Mikhail Koryakin	Stepan Trezvinsky
Spring Beauty	mezzo-soprano	Mariya Kamenskaya	Aleksandra Krutikova
Grandfather Frost	bass	Fyodor Stravinsky	Stepan Vlasov
The Snow Maiden	soprano	Feodosiya Velinskaya	Margarita Eykhenvald (Eichenwald)
Bobyl Bakula	tenor	Vasily Vasilyev (Vasilyev II)	
Bobylikha	mezzo-soprano	Olga Shreder (Schröder)	Varvara Pavlenkova
Lel	contralto	Anna Bichurina	Lidiya Zvyagina
Kupava, a young maiden, daughter of a wealthy settler	soprano	Mariya Makarova	Mariya Deysha-Sionitskaya
Mizgir, a merchant guest from the Berendeyans' trading quarter	baritone	Ippolit Pryanishnikov	Bogomir Korsov
First Herald	tenor	Pavel Dyuzhikov	
Second Herald	bass	Vladimir Mayboroda	
Tsar's page	mezzo-soprano		
Wood-Sprite	tenor	Vladimir Sobolev	
Maslenitsa	bass		
Chorus, silent roles: Boyars, their wives and the tsar's retinue, gusli-players, blind men, skomorokhi, gudok-players, bag-pipers, shepherds, lads and lasses, male and female Berendeyans of every age and calling, forest sprites, Spring's retinue – birds, flowers chorus

== Synopsis ==
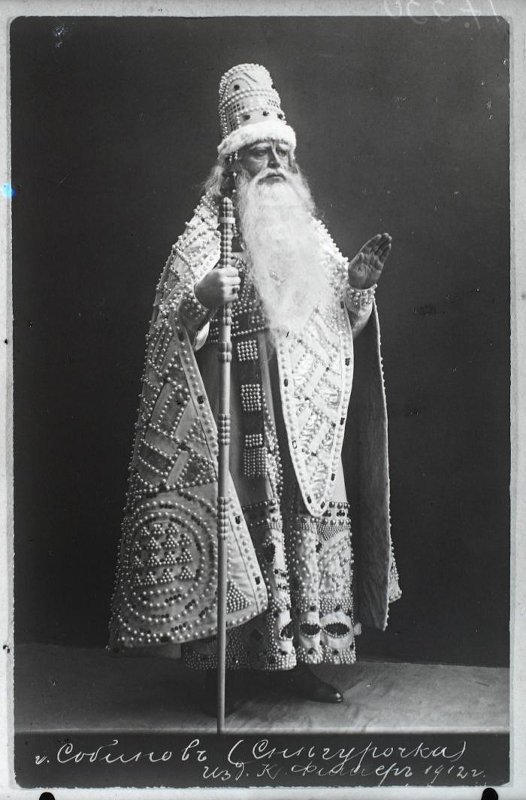
Leonid Sobinov as Tsar Berendey, (Bolshoy Theatre, Moscow 1911)

Time: Pre-historic times
Place: The land of the Berendeyans

=== Prologue ===
On Red Hill, near the Berendeyans' trading quarter and Tsar Berendey's capital. The fifteen-year-old Snow Maiden wants to live with the people in the nearby village, and her parents, Spring Beauty and Grandfather Frost, agree to let her be adopted by Bobyl-Bakula and his wife.

=== Act 1 ===
In the village of Berendeyevka, on the other side of the river.

Snow Maiden is enchanted by Lel's songs, but is saddened when he goes off with a group of other girls. Kupava enters and announces her own wedding to Mizgir. The ceremony takes place, but then Mizgir notices Snow Maiden, becomes smitten with her, and begs her to love him. Kupava brings this effrontery before the villagers, and they advise her to go to the Tsar for redress.

=== Act 2 ===
In Tsar Berendey's palace

Kupava complains of Mizgir to Tsar Berendey, who decides to banish Mizgir to the forest. But these deliberations are disrupted by the appearance of the beautiful Snow Maiden. The Tsar asks her whom she loves, and she says, "No one." The Tsar declares that whoever successfully woos Snow Maiden will win both her and a royal reward. Although the maidens present Lel as the likely candidate, Mizgir swears that he will win Snow Maiden's heart. The Tsar agrees to the contest as the people sing his praises.

=== Act 3 ===
In a forest reserve, that evening

The people amuse themselves with song and dance. The Tsar invites Lel to choose a maiden. Despite Snow Maiden's pleas, he kisses Kupava and goes off with her. Snow Maiden, left alone and disconsolate, wonders why Lel has rejected her. Suddenly Mizgir appears and tries once more to win her love. Frightened by his words, she runs off; the Wood-Sprite tricks Mizgir to follow an apparition of Snow Maiden instead. Lel and Kupava enter, declaring their mutual love. Snow Maiden finds them and, seeing their happiness, at last truly wishes to have the capacity to love.

=== Act 4 ===
In the valley of Yarilo, the sun god, dawn is breaking the next day

Snow Maiden calls on her mother, Spring-Beauty, who appears from a lake surrounded by flowers. Spring gives her daughter a garland and warns her to stay out of the light of the sun. Spring and her retinue sink into the lake. Before Snow Maiden can enter the protection of the forest, Mizgir appears. No longer able to resist, she professes her love for him. The Berendeyans, in ritual bride-and-groom pairs, arrive to celebrate Yarilo's Day. Mizgir introduces Snow Maiden as his bride. As she declares her love for Mizgir, a bright ray of sunlight appears, and Snow Maiden bids farewell: the power to love is the source of her demise. To the astonishment of the people, she melts. The inconsolable Mizgir drowns himself in the lake. The Tsar calms the horrified Berendeyans with the fact that this event has ended the fifteen-year-long winter that has befallen them. In response the people strike up a stirring hymn to Yarilo.

== Principal arias and numbers ==
Prologue

Introduction
Chorus of the Birds
Snow Maiden's Aria
Chorus: Farewell to Maslenitsa

Act 1

Lel's First Song
Lel's Second Song

Act 2

Procession of Tsar Berendey

Act 3

Dance of the Skomorokhi (Danse of the Tumblers / Danse of the Clowns)
Lel's Third Song

Act 4

Hymn to Yarilo

== Derived and related works ==
- The Suite from the opera The Snow Maiden includes:
1. Introduction
2. Dance of the Birds
3. Procession of Tsar Berendey (Cortege)
4. Dance of the Skomorokhi (Dance of the Tumblers)
- Pyotr Ilyich Tchaikovsky's incidental music to Ostrovsky's play The Snow Maiden, written in 1873.

== Recordings ==
Audio Recordings (Mainly studio recordings)

Source: www.operadis-opera-discography.org.uk

- 1943 Sergei Lemeshev (Tsar Berendey), Nadezhda Obukhova (Spring Beauty), Maxim Mikhailov (Grandfather Frost), Irina Maslennikova (Snow Maiden), Maria Maksakova (Lel), Sofia Panova (Kupava), Alexei Ivanov (Mizgir); Bolshoi Theatre Orchestra & Chorus; Kiril Kondrashin, conductor (Live) ;
- 1955 Stepan Andrashevich (Tsar Berendey), Biserka Cvejić (Spring Beauty), Miroslav Čangalović (Grandfather Frost), Sofija Janković (Snow Maiden), Milica Miladinović (Lel), Valerija Heybal (Kupava), Dušan Popović (Mizgir); Belgrade National Opera Orchestra & Chorus; Krešimir Baranović, conductor (Decca) ;
- 1956 Ivan Kozlovsky (Tsar Berendey), Vera Borisenko (Spring Beauty), Alexei Krivchenya (Grandfather Frost), Vera Firsova (Snow Maiden), Larisa Avdeyeva (Lel), Galina Vishnevskaya (Kupava), Yuri Galkin (Mizgir); Bolshoi Theatre Orchestra & Chorus; Evgeny Svetlanov, conductor ;
- 1975 Anton Grigoryev (Tsar Berendey), Irina Arkhipova (Spring Beauty), Alexander Vedernikov (Grandfather Frost), Valentina Sokolik (Snow Maiden), Irina Arkhipova (Lel), Lidiya Zakharenko (Kupava), Anatoly Moksyakov (Mizgir); Moscow Radio Symphony Orchestra & Chorus; Vladimir Fedoseyev, conductor ;
- 1985 Avram Andreev (Tsar Berendey), Alexandrina Milcheva (Spring Beauty), Nicola Ghiuselev (Grandfather Frost), Elena Zemenkova (Snow Maiden), Stefka Mineva (Lel), Stefka Evstatieva (Kupava), Lyubomir Videnov (Mizgir); Bulgarian Radio Symphony Orchestra & Chorus; Stoyan Angelov, conductor (Capriccio) ;
- 1987 Alexander Fedin (Tsar Berendey), Nina Terentieva (Spring Beauty), Georgy Seleznev (Grandfather Frost), Irina Zhurina (Snow Maiden), Tatiana Erastova (Lel), Lyudmila Sergienko (Kupava), Igor Morozov (Mizgir); Bolshoi Theatre Orchestra & Chorus; Alexander Lazarev, conductor ;
- 2021 (BD and DVD release): 2017 Opéra national de Paris production, Aida Garifullina (Snowmaiden), Yuriy Mynenko (Lel), Martina Serafin (Kupava), Maxim Paster (Tsar Berendey), Thomas Johannes Mayer (Mizgir), Elena Manistina (Spring Beauty), Vladimir Ognovenko (Father Frost), Franz Hawlata (Bermyata), Vasily Gorshkov (Bobyl Bakula), Opéra national de Paris, Mikhail Tatarnikov, conductor, (Dmitri Tcherniakov stage direction).

== Movie ==
In 2017, the Paris Opera made a film of a Russian language performance of the opera, based on a live production by Orchestre de l'Opéra National de Paris. The Snowmaiden was Aida Garifullina, and Lel was Yuri Mynenko. The conductor was Mikhail Tatarnikov, with stage direction and set design by Dmitri Cherniakov.

== Sources ==
- Abraham, Gerald (1936). "X.-- Snegurochka ('Snow Maiden')". Studies in Russian Music. London: William Reeves / The New Temple Press. pp. 193–220.
- Halbe, Gregory A. Music, Drama, and Folklore in Rimsky-Korsakov's Opera "Snegurochka". PhD dissertation, Musicology, Ohio State University, 2004.
- Lischke, André, "Les leitmotives de Snegourotchka analysés par Rimsky-Korsakov", Revue de musicologie 65/1 (1979), p. 51-75.
- Rimsky-Korsakov, Nikolai. My Musical Life. Trans. from the 5th rev. Russian ed. by Judah A. Joffe; ed. with an introduction by Carl Van Vechten. London : Ernst Eulenburg Ltd, 1974.
- _______. Разбор “Снегурочки". Литературные произведения и переписка. Полное собрание сочинений, Том IV. [Analysis of "Snowmaiden". Literary Works and Correspondence. Complete [sic] Collection of Works, Vol. IV.] Москва: Гос. муз. изд-во, 1960, p. 393-426.
- 100 опер: история создания, сюжет, музыка. [100 Operas: History of Creation, Subject, Music.] Ленинград: Издательство "Музыка," 1968, p. 336-341.
