= Natalya Rozhdestvenskaya =

Russian opera singer

Natalya Petrovna Rozhdestvenskaya (Наталья Петровна Рождественская) (7 May 1900 – 1 September 1997) was a Russian soprano, wife of conductor Nikolai Anosov and mother of Gennady Rozhdestvensky.

She performed mainly on the concert stage, and was a soloist for All-Union Radio in 1929–60, participating in concert performances of many operas, often conducted by her husband. Among her roles were Countess Almaviva, Donna Anna in both Don Giovanni and The Stone Guest, Mignon in the opera by Ambroise Thomas, Manon Lescaut, and Fevronia.

== Recordings ==
- Jadwiga Zapolskaya, in Rimsky-Korsakov's Pan Voyevoda conducted Samosud 1950
- Fevroniya in Rimsky-Korsakov's The Legend of the Invisible City of Kitezh and the Maiden Fevroniya conducted Nebolsin (1955 live, 1956 studio) "Grand Prix" (1963)
- Arabella in Richard Strauss's Arabella (sung in Russian)
- Stravinsky: The Rake's Progress (sung in Russian)
- Poulenc: La voix humaine (sung in Russian)
- Tchaikovsky: Oprichnik, cond. Alexander Orlov.
- Dargomyzhsky: The Stone Guest Orlov.
- Mahler Symphony No. 4 (Mahler) cond. Karl Eliasberg (1954)
