= Václav Suk =

Czech-born Russian violinist, conductor and composer (1861 - 1933)

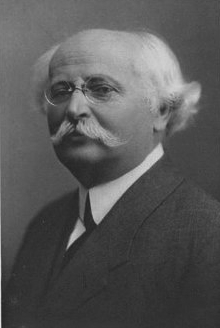
Václav Suk

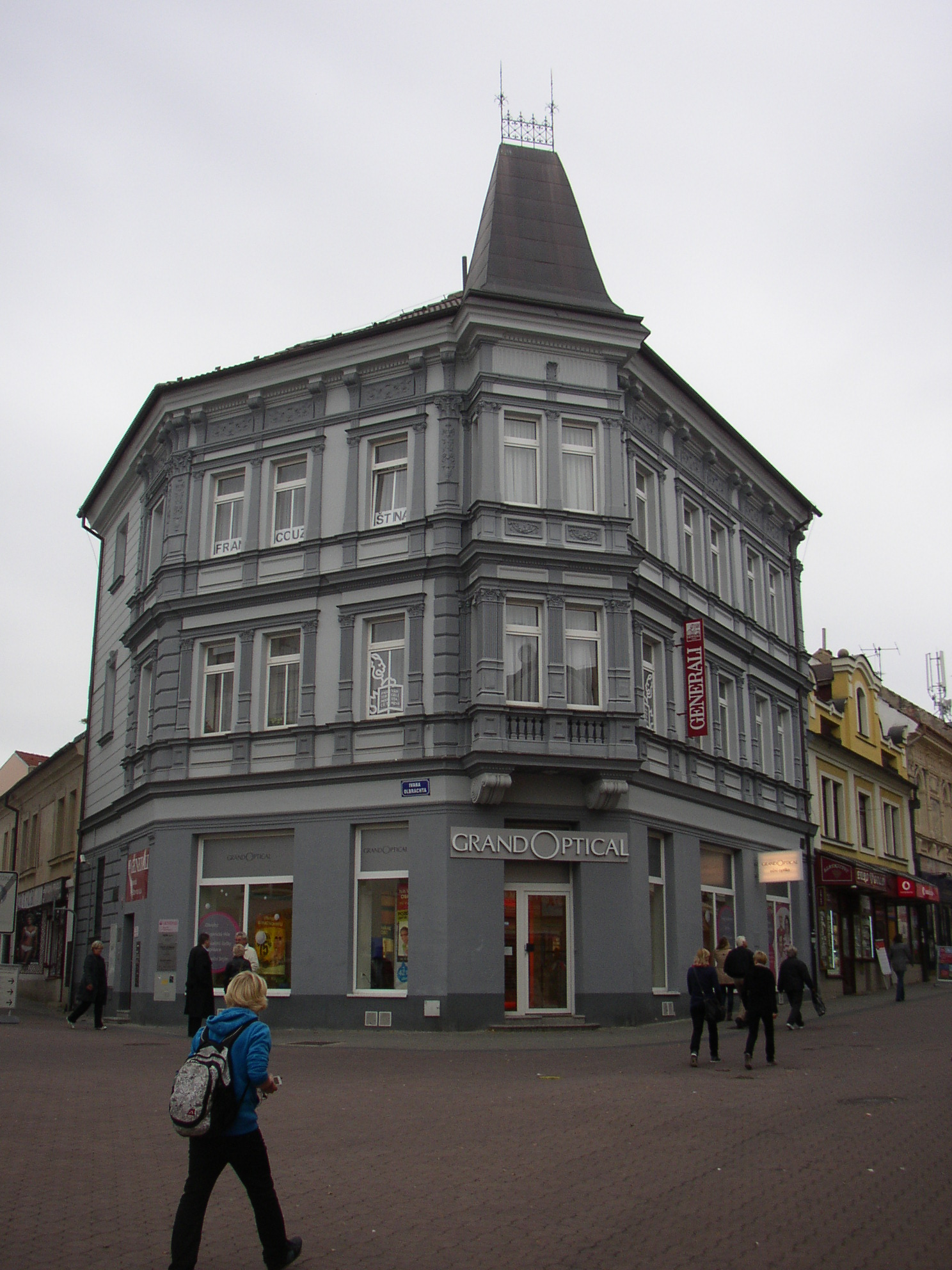
Birth house of V. Suk in main street of Kladno (90 Masaryk Street).

Václav Suk (16 November 1861 – 12 January 1933) was an Austrian-born violinist, conductor and composer who operated in the Russian Empire. He was also known as Váša Suk, Vyacheslav Suk, Vyacheslav Ivanovich (Вячеслав Иванович Сук) and Vjačeslav Ivanovič Suk.

== Biography ==
Suk was born in Kladno, Bohemia, Austrian Empire. He is said to have been related to the composer Joseph Suk. From 1873 to 1879 Suk studied violin at the Prague Conservatory as a pupil of Antonín Bennewitz. Concurrently he studied also counterpoint with Josef Krejčí, and, privately, composition with Zdeněk Fibich. In 1880 he went to Warsaw as a violinist in the Warsaw Philharmonic, but a short while later he was already engaged as a concert master in the Imperial Orchestra of Kiev (from 1880 to 1882). In 1885 his career as an opera conductor began with the Philharmonic Society in Moscow, where from 1882 he had served as a violinist with the Bolshoi orchestra, but he proved his abilities as kapellmeister of the opera in Kharkiv (1885–1886). Tchaikovsky recommended him to Saint Petersburg, but Suk went to Taganrog instead, where he began to also conduct symphonic works. His later employment with a private opera orchestra in Vilnius lasted from 1890 to 1894, and this was followed by guest performances or shorter engagements in many of the larger places in Russia, e.g. in Kharkiv, Moscow, Saint Petersburg, Kazan, and Saratov. In 1906 Suk returned to Moscow and became the kapellmeister of the opera of the Bolshoi Theatre. He conducted there for more than 25 years, until 1932, from 1928 on as its conductor-in-chief, and from 1927 he conducted also at the Stanislavski Opera Theatre in Moscow. He asserted himself also as a symphonic conductor, and promoted the works of Czech composers in Russia. - particularly works by Antonín Dvořák and Bedřich Smetana. After the Revolution he was commissioned with the organization of the Moscow Philharmonic Concerts, and in 1923 he was given the honour of conducting a special production at the Bolshoi of Richard Wagner's Lohengrin on the dual occasion of the 40th anniversary of the composer's death and of the 25-year stage jubilee of the famous Lohengrin-singer Leonid Sobinov. Suk, who had a reputation of being an authentic interpreter of Tchaikovsky's music and of Rimsky-Korsakov's operas, some of which he premiered, was awarded many more honours during his Russian career. He died, aged 71, in Moscow, and the "orchestral foyer" in the Great Theatre was posthumously named after him.

== Selected works ==
Piano

- Two Czech Dances, Op. 2
- Four Pieces, Op. 3
- Variations to the words of Czech Folksong

Chamber

- Czech Folksongs - for string quartet
- Four Pieces - for violin and piano

Symphonic

- Jan Hus - symphonic poem
- Symphony, Op. 13
- Festive March to the Memory of Richard Wagner
- Serenade in E-flat major
- Serenade in D major - for string orchestra

Songs

- Czech Songs - for voice and piano
- My Wish
