= Alexander Vedernikov (bass) =

- Vedernikov in 1964
- Born: Alexander Filippovich Vedernikov; 23 December 1927; Mokino, Vyatka Governorate, RSFSR, Soviet Union
- Died: 9 January 2018 (aged 90); Moscow, Russia
- Awards: People's Artist of the USSR (1976)

Alexander Filippovich Vedernikov (Russian: Алекса́ндр Фили́ппович Веде́рников; 23 December 1927 – 9 January 2018) was a Soviet and Russian opera and chamber singer (bass) and teacher. He was the soloist of the Bolshoi Theatre of the USSR from 1958 to 1990.

His son was the Russian conductor Alexander Vedernikov.

== Awards ==
- Winner of the performers competition of World Festival of Youth and Students (2nd Prize, 1953)
- Winner of Robert Schumann International Competition for Pianists and Singers (1956)
- Winner of the All-Union competition for the execution of works by Soviet composers (1st prize, 1956)
- Honored Artist of the RSFSR (1961)
- People's Artist of the RSFSR (1967)
- USSR State Prize (1969)
- People's Artist of the USSR (1976)
