= Vasily Rodionovich Petrov =

Russian opera singer

Vasily Petrov Василий Родионович Петров
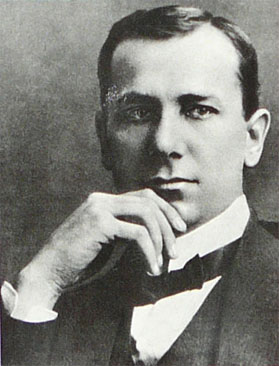
- Vasily Rodionovich Petrov

Background information
- Born: Vasily Rodionovich Petrov; 1875; Kharkov Governorate, Russian Empire
- Died: 4 May 1937 (aged 62) Moscow, Soviet Union
- Occupation: Opera singer (bass)
- Years active: 1898-1936

Vasily Rodionovich Petrov (Russian: Васи́лий Родио́нович Петро́в; 12 March [O.S. 28 February] 1875, Kharkov Governorate, Russian Empire - 4 May 1937, Moscow, USSR) was an outstanding Russian opera singer (bass).

Feodor Chaliapin once commented to him, "Ah, Vasya, if I could have your voice." (ru: «Эх, Вася, мне бы твой голос»). This jocular remark bore testament to Vasily Petrov's undeniable talent.

Petrov was born into the large family of a village tailor. His musical abilities were evident from an early age: he learned to play the violin at the age of five, and at the age of nine he was learning to play the violin professionally, as well as singing in a choir. He graduated from a ministerial free school for the poor and began to work as a teacher. Soon after, he moved to Kharkov. In 1894, he injured a finger, preventing him from pursuing a career as a violinist. However, he still had one musical passion — singing. At the end of 1894, Vasily Petrov became a chorister with the Kharkov Cathedral. In 1895 he joined a provincial Ukrainian private Opera company, fulfilling his wish to become an operatic artist.

In 1898, one of his friends asked the Directorate of the Moscow Conservatory about interviewing Vasily Petrov. Consequently, Petrov was immediately enrolled to study at the Moscow Conservatory under supervision of Anton Bartzal (Russian: Антон Иванович Барцал). He graduated from the Moscow Conservatory in 1902 and was immediately accepted into the Moscow Imperial Troup (Bolshoi Theatre) where he performed in concerts.

In 1899, Petrov, who was still merely a student in the first stage of his course, replaced the ill Chaliapin as Dosifey in the opera Khovanshchina in Mamontov's Private Russian Opera company. Thus began the friendship of the two great Russian bass singers. Petrov played the role of Dosifey again in 1910 with the Zimin Opera company.

During and after the Russian Revolution of 1917, he managed to retain his position at the Bolshoi Theatre due to having come from a working-class background.

From 1923, as the result of complications from having contracted malaria, both of Petrov's legs atrophied leaving him reliant on prostheses in order to walk, but this did not deter him from actively performing onstage.

At the invitation of Constantin Stanislavski, Petrov taught at the Stanislavski Opera studio from 1925 to 1929. He also taught at other music institutions and continued his work at the Bolshoi theatre until 1936. His last performance was at the Bolshoi theatre in June 1936 as Vasily Sobakin in the opera The Tsar's bride by N. Rimsky-Korsakov.

During his career, Petrov sang in 87 different operatic roles at Bolshoi theatre.

He died on 4 May 1937 in Moscow.

Vasily Rodionovich Petrov remains for posterity as one of the greatest representatives of Russian vocal art.

His grandson, Nikolai Arnoldovich Petrov (1943–2011), was known as an outstanding pianist.

== Watch and listen ==
- Vasily Petrov: Dosifey on YouTube
- Vasily Petrov: Song of Bursh on YouTube
- Vassily Petrov (1875-1937), bass, soloist of the Bolshoi theatre (1902-1936). Ruslan's aria from the "Ruslan and Ludmila" by M. Glinka. Rec. 1913 on YouTube
- Vassily Petrov (1875-1937), bass, soloist of the Bolshoi theatre (1902-1936). Piman's narration from the "Boris Godunov" by M. Mussorgsky. Rec. 1913 on YouTube
- Vasili Petrov: Last Voyage (E.Alnes - G.Fergeland) on YouTube
- V. Petrov / Gremin's aria, 1934 on YouTube
