= Private Opera =

Russian private operatic enterprise

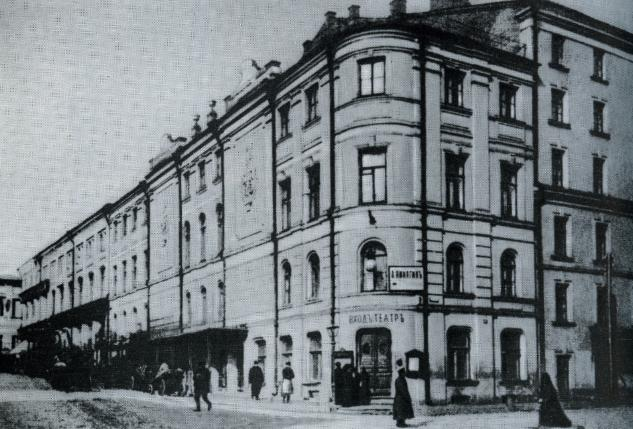
The Solodovnikov Theatre

The Private Opera (Russian: Частная Опера), also known as:

- The Russian Private Opera (Русская Частная Опера);
- Moscow Private Russian Opera, (Московская Частная Русская Опера);
- Mamontov's Private Russian Opera in Moscow (Мамонтова Частная Русская Опера в Москве);
- Korotkov's Theatre (Театр Кроткова, 1885-1888);
- Vinter's Theatre (Театр Винтера, 1896-1899);
- Private Opera Society (Товарищество Частной Оперы, 1899-1904); and
- Solodovnikov Theatre (Театр Солодовникова, from 1895; later used by Zimin opera, Moscow Operetta, and Helikon Opera)

was a private operatic enterprise, a company established in 1885 by Russian industrialist and philanthropist Savva Mamontov, who staged the operas, conducted the orchestra, trained the actors, taught them singing and paid all the expenses.

== The company ==
At first the company was organised in Abramtsevo Estate located north of Moscow.

== Later years ==
In Moscow the opera was located in the house at the Bolshaya Dmitrovskaya street, known as "Solodovnikov Theatre", built in 1894–1895 by Russiant merchant and music lover Gavrila Solodovnikov (1826–1901). Later the house was burned down and the Private Opera moved into the theatre "Paradis" («Парадиз»), at 19/13, Bolshaya Nikitskaya Street (present-day Mayakovsky Theater).

The repertoire included many operas by foreign composers as well as the following works by Russian composers:

- 1885 – A Life for the Tsar by Mikhail Glinka;
- 1885 – The Snow Maiden by Nikolai Rimsky-Korsakov;
- 1885 – Rusalka by Alexander Dargomyzhsky;
- 1886 – The Stone Guest by Alexander Dargomyzhsky;
- 1886 – Rogneda by Alexander Serov;
- 1886 – Prince Igor by Alexander Borodin;
- 1886 – The Demon by Anton Rubinstein;
- 1897 – Sadko by Nikolai Rimsky-Korsakov – world premiere;
- 1897 – Khovanshchina by Modest Mussorgsky;
- 1898 – Boris Godunov by Modest Mussorgsky;
- 1898 – Mozart and Salieri by Nikolai Rimsky-Korsakov – world premiere;
- 1898 – Boyarinya Vera Sheloga by Nikolai Rimsky-Korsakov – world premiere;
- 1898 – Judith by Alexander Serov;
- 1899 – The Tsar's Bride by Nikolai Rimsky-Korsakov – world premiere;
- 1899 – The Maid of Orleans by Pyotr Tchaikovsky;
- 1900 – Mazeppa by Pyotr Tchaikovsky;
- 1900 – The Tale of Tsar Saltan... by Nikolai Rimsky-Korsakov – world premiere;
- 1900 – Asya by Mikhail Ippolitov-Ivanov;
- 1901 – The Merchant Kalashnikov by Anton Rubinstein;
- 1902 – Ruslan and Lyudmila by Mikhail Glinka;
- 1902 – Kashchey the Immortal by Nikolai Rimsky-Korsakov – world premiere;
- 1903 – Legend About the Great City of Kitezh and the Quiet Lake Svetoyar by Sergei Vasilenko, and other.

== Final years ==
In late 1890s, Mamontov consolidated a large lot of land in central Moscow, across from Theatre Square, for building a large civic center with his opera hall and a luxury hotel. He appointed William Walcot as lead architect, however, in 1899 Mamontov was unjustly arrested and put on trial for embezzlement connected with building of the Yaroslavl railway. The project, known as Hotel Metropol, was completed without theater by Petersburg Insurance Company.

Meanwhile, from 1899 until 1904 the company existed without Mamontov, and changed its name to "Private Opera Society" (Tovarishchestvo chastnoi opery).

== See also ==
- Russian opera
- Russian opera articles

== Bibliography ==
- Haldey, Olga (2010). Mamontov's Private Opera : the search for modernism in Russian theater . Bloomington: Indiana University Press. ISBN 978-0-253-35468-6.
