= List of compositions by Nikolai Rimsky-Korsakov =

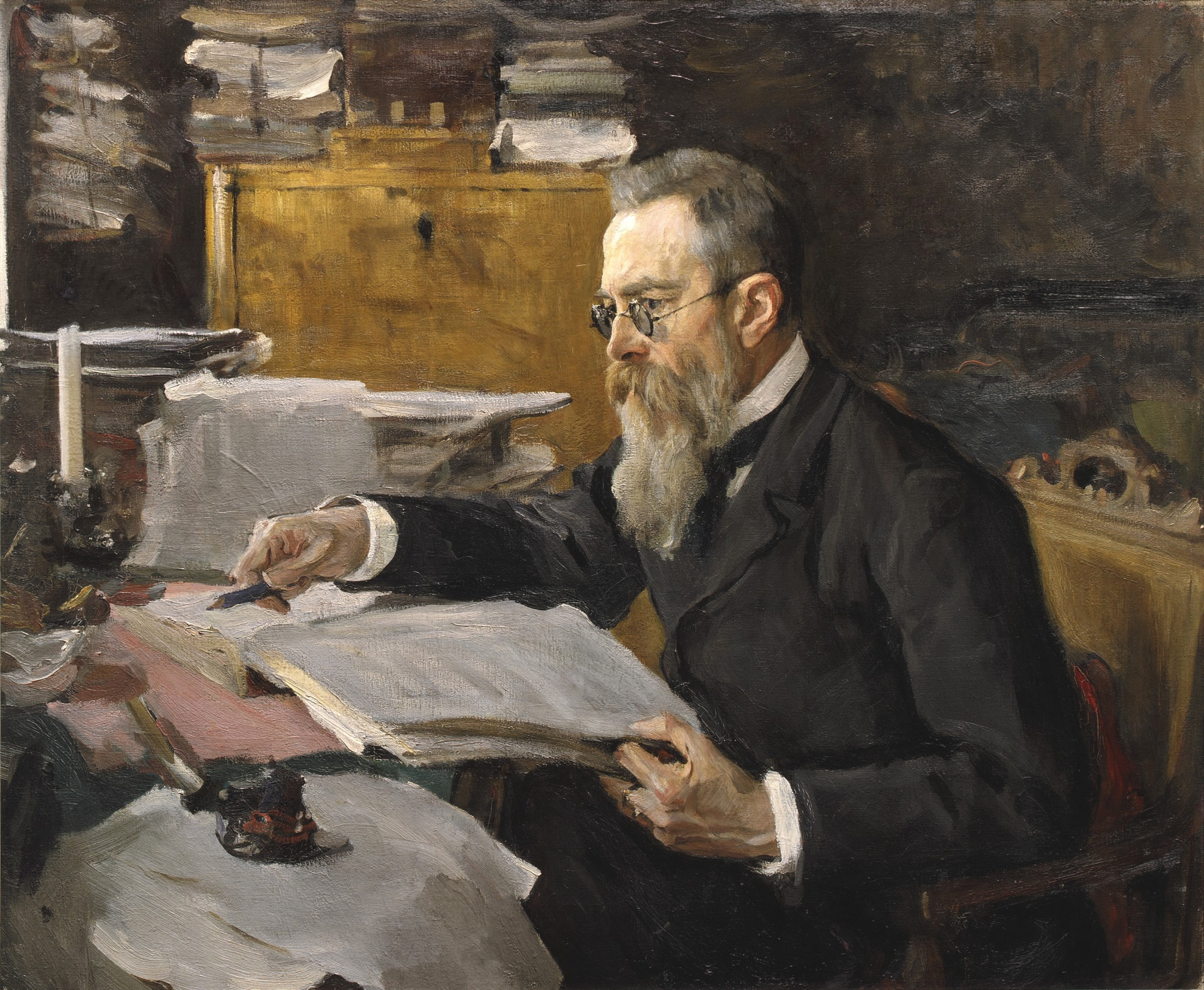
Portrait of Nikolai Rimsky-Korsakov by Valentin Serov (1898)

The following is a partial list of compositions by the composer Nikolai Rimsky-Korsakov (1844–1908).

== Operas ==
- The Maid of Pskov (Псковитянка = Pskovitjanka) (sometimes referred to as Ivan the Terrible), 1868–1872 (1st version), 1876–1877 (2nd version), 1891–1892 (3rd version)
- Mlada (Млада), 1872 (portions of acts 2 and 3 from project composed collectively by Borodin, Cui, Minkus, Mussorgsky, and Rimsky-Korsakov)
- May Night (Майская ночь = Majskaja noch’), 1878–1879
- The Snow Maiden (Снегурочка = Sneguročka), 1880–1881 (1st version), ca. 1895 (2nd version)
- Mlada (Млада), 1889–1890 (complete setting of unstaged collaborative project from 1872)
- Christmas Eve (Ночь перед Рождеством = Noč' pered Roždestvom), 1894–1895
- Sadko (Садко), 1895–1896
- Mozart and Salieri (Моцарт и Сальери = Mocart i Sal'eri), Op. 48, 1897
- The Noblewoman Vera Sheloga (Боярыня Вера Шелога = Bojarynja Vera Šeloga), Op. 54, 1898
- The Tsar's Bride (Царская невеста = Carskaja nevesta), 1898
- The Tale of Tsar Saltan, of His Son, the Famous and Mighty Bogatyr Prince Gvidon Saltanovich, and of the Beautiful Princess Swan (Сказка о царе Салтане, о сыне его, славном и могучем богатыре князе Гвидоне Салтановиче и о прекрасной Царевне Лебеди = Skazka o care Saltane, o syne ego, slavnom i mogučem bogatyre knjaze Gvidone Saltanoviče i o prekrasnoj Carevne Lebedi), 1899–1900
- Servilia (Сервилия = Servilija), 1900–1901
- Kashchey the Immortal (Кащей бессмертный = Kaščej bessmertnyj), 1901–1902
- Pan Voyevoda (Пан воевода = Pan vojevoda; literally, The Gentleman Provincial Governor), 1902–1903
- The Legend of the Invisible City of Kitezh and the Maiden Fevroniya (Сказание о невидимом граде Китеже и деве Февронии = Skazanie o nevidimom grade Kiteže i deve Fevronii), 1903–1904
- The Golden Cockerel (Золотой петушок = Zolotoj petušok), 1906–1907

== Choral music ==
=== Sacred choral ===
(all a cappella)

- "Thee, O God, We Praise" ("Тебе Бога хвалим"), for double chorus, 1883
- Collection of Sacred Musical Compositions by N.A. Rimsky-Korsakov Used at the Imperial Court. Four-Voice Compositions from the Liturgy of St. John Chrysostom, Op. 22, 1883; contains 8 pieces
- Collection of Sacred Musical Arrangements by N.A. Rimsky-Korsakov Used at the Imperial Court, Op. 22b, 1884; contains 6 hymns based on chant melodies
- Collection of Sacred Musical Compositions and Arrangements by N.A. Rimsky-Korsakov for Mixed Chorus, 1883–1884; contains 23 pieces, published posthumously in 1913

=== Secular choral ===
(a cappella unless otherwise indicated)

- Two Choruses, Op. 13, for three women's parts, 1874
- Four Variations and a Fughetta on the Russian Folksong "Надоели ночи", Op. 14, for four women's parts with piano or harmonium ad lib. 1874
- Six Choruses, Op. 16, variously for mixed, women's, and men's voices, 1875–1876
- Two Choruses, Op. 18/22, for mixed voices, 1876
- Four Choruses, Op. 23, for three men's parts with piano ad lib., 1876
- Poem about Alexei, Man of God, Op. 20, for altos, tenors, and bass with orchestra, 1878
- Fifteen Russian Folksongs, Op. 19, for mixed voices, 1879
- "Glory" ("Слава" = "Slava"), Op. 21, for mixed voices with orchestra, 1879–1890
- Two Choruses, for children's voices, 1884
- Switezianka, Op. 44, cantata for soprano and tenor soloists and mixed voices with orchestra, 1897
- Song of Oleg the Wise, Op. 58, cantata for tenor and bass soloists and men's voices with orchestra, 1899
- From Homer, Op. 60, prelude-cantata for soprano, mezzo-soprano, and alto soloists and women's voices with orchestra, 1901

== Orchestral and band music ==
=== Works for symphony orchestra ===
- Symphony No. 1 in E minor, Op. 1, 1861–1865 (1st version), 1884 (2nd version)
- Overture on Three Russian Themes, Op. 28, 1866 (1st version), 1879–1880 (2nd version)
- Fantasy on Serbian Themes, Op. 6 1867 (1st version), 1886–1887 (2nd version); also called Serbian Fantasy
- Sadko, Op. 5, musical tableau, 1867 (1st version), 1869 (2nd version), 1891–1892 (3rd version)
- Antar, Op. 9, 1868 (1st version), 1875 (2nd version), 1897 (3rd version), 1903 (amended 2nd version published by Bessel). Originally designated "Symphony No. 2," he later reclassified it a "symphonic suite." (See Rimsky-Korsakov, My Musical Life, 92.)
- Symphony No. 3 in C, Op. 32, 1866–1873 (1st version), 1886 (2nd version)
- Music to Mei's drama The Maid of Pskov, suite of five numbers, 1877 (adapted from the opera as incidental music)
- Fairytale [Сказка = Skazka], Op. 29, 1879–1880
- Sinfonietta on Russian Themes in A minor, Op. 31, 1879–1884; adaptation of first three movements from string quartet of 1878–1879
- Capriccio Espagnol, Op. 34, 1887, (Based mainly on Asturian traditional folk music themes)
- Scheherazade, Op. 35, symphonic suite, 1888
- Russian Easter Festival Overture (Светлый праздник), Op. 36, 1888
- Theme and Variation No. 4, 1903, from collective set of variations on a Russian theme, with Artsybushev, Vitols, Lyadov, Sokolov, and Glazunov
- On the Tomb, Op. 61, prelude, 1904, in memory of M.P. Belaieff
- "Dubinushka", Op. 62, 1905 (1st version), 1906 (2nd version with choral parts ad lib.)
- "Greeting" ["Здравица"], 1907, for Glazunov
- Neapolitan Song [i.e., "Funiculi, funicula"], Op. 63, 1907

=== Opera excerpts for orchestral concerts ===
- The Snow Maiden – Suite; includes "Dance of the Skomorokhi" (act 3) (also known as "Dance of the Clowns" or "Dance of the Tumblers")
- Mlada
  - Suite; includes "Procession of the Nobles"
  - Night on Mount Triglav, 1899–1901; purely orchestral adaptation of act 3
- Christmas Eve Suite
  - Includes "Polonaise" (from Christmas Eve, act 3, tableaux no. 7)
- The Tale of Tsar Saltan
  - Suite: Three Musical Pictures, Op. 57 (1903) (The excerpts are the introductions to act 1; act 2; and act 4, tableau 2)
  - "Flight of the Bumblebee" (from act 3, tableau 1)
- Pan Voyevoda Suite Op. 59
- The Golden Cockerel
  - Introduction and Cortège de Noces (Wedding March)
  - Suite (prepared by Glazunov and M. Steinberg)
- The Legend of the Invisible City of Kitezh and the Maiden Fevroniya, suite (prepared by Glazunov and M. Steinberg)
  - Suite; includes "Wedding Procession" (from act 2 "Little Kitezh on the Volga") & "The Battle of Kershenets" (from act 3, scene 1 "Great Kitezh")

=== Solo instrumental music with orchestra or band ===
- Concerto in B♭, for trombone and military band, 1877
- Variations in G minor on a theme by Glinka, for oboe and military band, 1878
- Konzertstück in E♭, for clarinet and military band, 1878
- Piano Concerto in C♯ minor, Op. 30, 1882–1883
- Fantasy on Two Russian Themes, for violin and orchestra, Op. 33, 1886–1887
- Mazurka on [Three] Polish Folk Themes, for violin and orchestra, 1888; also called Souvenir de trois chants polonais
- Serenade for cello and orchestra, Op. 37, orchestrated in 1903 from cello/piano original

== Songs ==
=== Romances, other art songs and duets ===
(For solo voice with piano accompaniment unless otherwise indicated.)

- "Butterfly" [Бабочка = Babochka], duet, 1855
- "Come out to me, signora" [Выходи ко мне, синьора = Vykhodi ko mne, sin'ora], 1861
- "In the blood burns the fire of desire" [В крови горит огонь любви = V krovi gorit ogon' ljubvi], 1865 (current provenance unknown)
- Four Songs, Op. 2, 1865–1866 (often called Four Romances)
1. Lean Thy Cheek to Mine
2. The Nightingale and the Rose (based on Persian poetry)
3. Lullaby (from Lev Mei's verse drama that was the basis for the opera The Maid of Pskov; incorporated later into the opera The Noblewoman Vera Sheloga)
4. From My Tears
- Four Songs, Op. 3, 1866
1. Jel' i pal'ma
2. Juzhnaja noch'
3. Nochevala tuchka zolotaja
4. Na kholmakh Gruziji (On the hills of Georgia)
- Four Songs, Op. 4, 1866
- Four Songs, Op. 7, 1867
- Six Songs, Op. 8, 1868–1870
- Two Songs, Op. 25, 1870
- Four Songs, Op. 26, 1882
- Four Songs, Op. 27, 1883
- Four Songs, Op. 39, 1897
- Four Songs, Op. 40, 1897
- Four Songs, Op. 41, 1897
- Four Songs, Op. 42, 1897
- In Spring [Весной], Op. 43, 1897 (four songs)
- To the Poet [Поэту], Op. 45, 1897–1899 (five songs)
- By the Sea [У моря], Op. 46, 1897 (five songs)
- Two Duets, Op. 47, for mezzo-soprano and baritone or soprano and tenor, 1897
- Two Songs, Op. 49, for bass, 1882–1897
- Four Songs, Op. 50, 1897–1898
- Five Songs, Op. 51, 1898
- Two Duets, Op. 52, 1897–1898
- Dragonflies [Стрекозы], Op. 53, for three sopranos, 1897
- Four Songs, Op. 55, for tenor, 1897–1898
- Two Songs, Op. 56, for soprano, 1898

=== Folksong collections ===
- Collection of One Hundred Russian Folksongs, Op. 24, 1875–1876
- Forty Folksongs, 1875–1882

== Chamber music ==
- String Quartet in F, Op. 12, 1875
- String Sextet in A, for pairs of violins, violas, and violoncellos, 1876
- Quintet in B-flat, for flute, clarinet, horn, bassoon, and piano, 1876
- String Quartet on Russian Themes, 1878–1879
  - The first three movements were later adapted for a Sinfonietta, Op. 31
  - The remaining fourth movement has the title "In a Monastery" ["В монастыре"]. (A version for piano four-hands is called "In a Church")
- Four Variations on a Chorale in G minor, for string quartet, 1885
- String Quartet "B-la-F", 1st movement, 1886; other movements by Lyadov, Glazunov, and Borodin
- String Quartet Jour de fête [Именины], finale ("Round-Dance" ["Хоровод"]), 1887; other movements by Glazunov and Lyadov
- Nocturne in F, for four horns, ca. 1888
- Two Duets in F, for two horns, 1883?–1894?
- Canzonetta and Tarantella, for two clarinets, 1883?–1894?
- Serenade, for violoncello and piano, 1893; also orchestrated as Op. 37
- String Quartet in G, 1897
- Trio in C minor, for violin, violoncello, and piano, 1897; completed by his son-in-law Maximilian Steinberg in 1939
- Theme and Variation No. 4 in G major, for string quartet, 1898; for collaborative Variations on a Russian Theme ("Надоели ночи надоскучили"), with Artsybushev, Skriabin, Glazunov, Lyadov, Vitols, Blumenfeld, Ewald, Winkler, and Sokolov
- Allegro in B-flat, for string quartet, 1899, for the collaborative set of string quartet pieces entitled Les vendredis, with Glazunov, Artsybushev, Sokolov, Lyadov, Vitols, Osten-Sacken, Blumenfeld, Borodin, and Kopylov

== Piano music ==
- Six Variations on the theme BACH, Op. 10, 1878 (Waltz, Intermezzo, Scherzo, Nocturne, Prelude and Fugue)
- Four Pieces, Op. 11, 1876–1877 (Impromptus, Novelette, Scherzino, Etude)
- Three Pieces, Op. 15, 1875–1876 (Waltz, Romance, Fugue)
- Six Fugues, Op. 17, 1875
- Two Pieces, Op. 38, 1894–1897 (Prelude-Impromptu, Mazurka)
- Variations (Nos. 1, 2, 6, 11, 3, 16 and 19) and Pieces (Lullaby, Little Fugue on the theme BACH, Tarantella, Minuet, Bells [Трезвон – Trezvon], Comic Fugue) from a collaborative paraphrase to the constant theme, 1878 (without opus no)
- Fugues and Fughettas, 1875–1876 (without opus no)
- Allegretto in C major, 1895 (without opus no)
- Prelude in G major, 1896 (without opus no)
- Theme and 1st variation from collaborative variations to the Russian theme, 1899 (without opus no)
- Fugue in C major for 4 hands (also: transcription in 2 hands), 1875 (without opus no)
- Variations to the theme by Misha, c.1878–1879 (without opus no)
- Song [Песенка = Pesenka] (Andantino) from the army collection Arzunkner, 1901 (without opus no)
- Finale of the collective Joke-Quadrille for 4 hands, 1890 (without opus no)

== Editing or completion of works by others ==
Alexander Borodin
Prince Igor (completed with Glazunov)

César Cui
William Ratcliff (orchestrated several passages for first performance in 1869)

Alexander Dargomyzhsky
The Stone Guest (orchestration only; composition finished by César Cui)

Mikhail Glinka
A Life for the Tsar (edited with Mily Balakirev and Anatoly Lyadov)
Ruslan and Lyudmila (edited with Balakirev and Lyadov)
Complete Orchestral Works (edited with Balakirev and Lyadov)

Modest Mussorgsky
Boris Godunov
Khovanshchina
Songs and Dances of Death (orchestration only)
Night on Bald Mountain

== Bibliography ==
- Rimsky-Korsakov, N.A. The Complete Sacred Choral Works. Monuments of Russian Sacred Music, Series III. Madison, CT: Musica Russica, 1999.
- _______. Полное собрание сочинений [Complete [sic] Collection of Works]. Москва, 1946–1970. (Reprinted by Kalmus/Belwin Mills.)
- Walker, Marina Frolova, "'Rimsky-Korsakov: (1) Nikolay Andreyevich Rimsky-Korsakov", Grove Music Online (subscription required), (Accessed 8 December 2005)
