= Pyotr Ilyich Tchaikovsky and The Five =

Ideological dispute among Russian composers

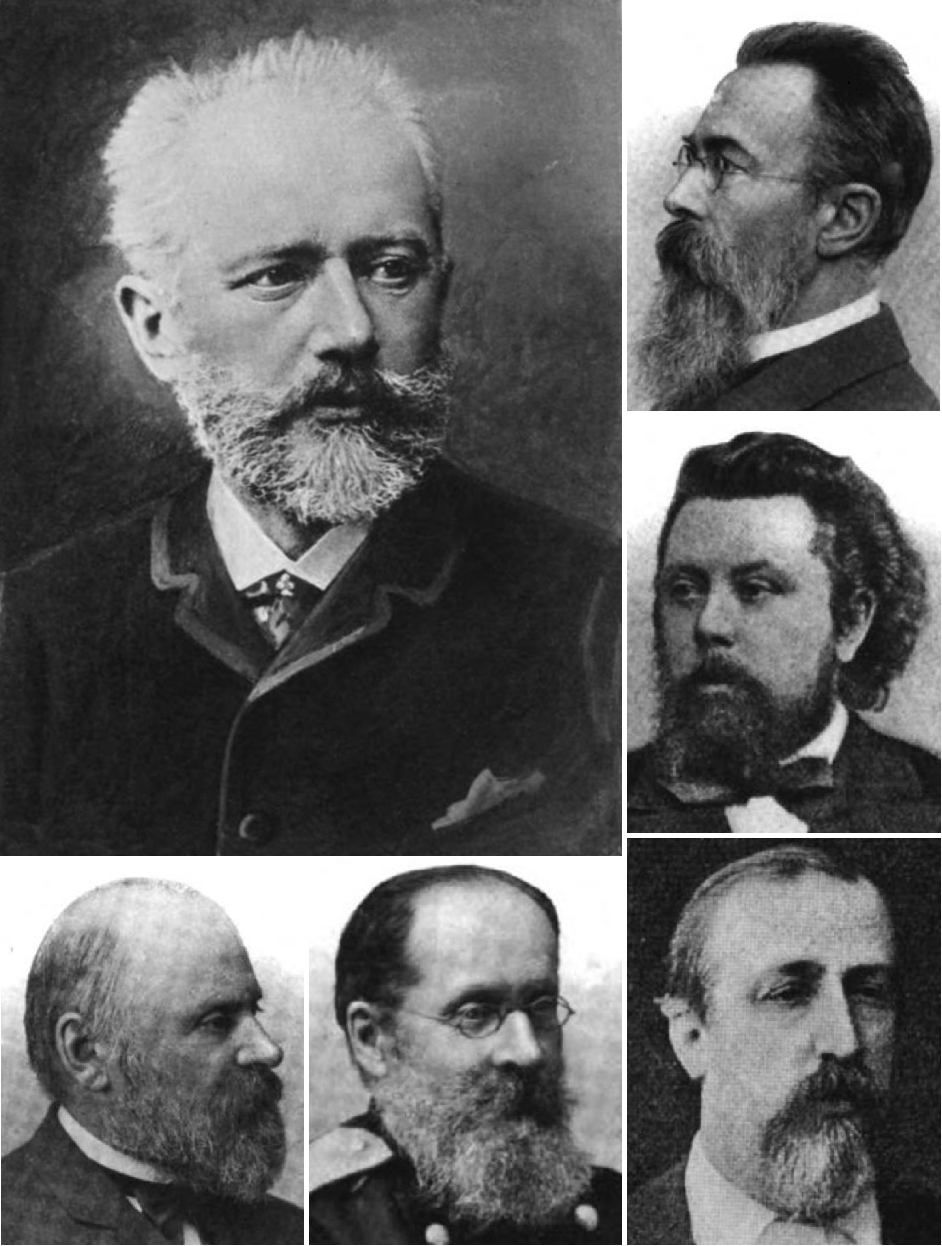
Pyotr Ilyich Tchaikovsky (top left) and The Five (counter-clockwise from bottom left): Mily Balakirev, César Cui, Alexander Borodin, Modest Mussorgsky, and Nikolai Rimsky-Korsakov

In mid- to late-19th-century Russia, Pyotr Ilyich Tchaikovsky and a group of composers known as The Five had differing opinions as to whether Russian classical music should be composed following Western or native practices. Tchaikovsky wanted to write professional compositions of such quality that they would stand up to Western scrutiny and thus transcend national barriers, yet remain distinctively Russian in melody, rhythm and other compositional characteristics. The Five, made up of composers Mily Balakirev, Alexander Borodin, César Cui, Modest Mussorgsky, and Nikolai Rimsky-Korsakov, sought to produce a specifically Russian kind of art music, rather than one that imitated older European music or relied on European-style conservatory training. While Tchaikovsky himself used folk songs in some of his works, for the most part he tried to follow Western practices of composition, especially in terms of tonality and tonal progression. Also, unlike Tchaikovsky, none of The Five were academically trained in composition; in fact, their leader, Balakirev, considered academicism a threat to musical imagination. Along with critic Vladimir Stasov, who supported The Five, Balakirev attacked relentlessly both the Saint Petersburg Conservatory, from which Tchaikovsky had graduated, and its founder Anton Rubinstein, orally and in print.

As Tchaikovsky had become Rubinstein's best-known student, he was initially considered by association as a natural target for attack, especially as fodder for Cui's printed critical reviews. This attitude changed slightly when Rubinstein left the Saint Petersburg musical scene in 1867. In 1869 Tchaikovsky entered into a working relationship with Balakirev; the result was Tchaikovsky's first recognized masterpiece, the fantasy-overture Romeo and Juliet, a work which The Five wholeheartedly embraced. When Tchaikovsky wrote a positive review of Rimsky-Korsakov's Fantasy on Serbian Themes he was welcomed into the circle, despite concerns about the academic nature of his musical background. The finale of his Second Symphony, nicknamed the Little Russian, was also received enthusiastically by the group on its first performance in 1872.

Tchaikovsky remained friendly but never intimate with most of The Five, ambivalent about their music; their goals and aesthetics did not match his. He took pains to ensure his musical independence from them as well as from the conservative faction at the Conservatory—an outcome facilitated by his acceptance of a professorship at the Moscow Conservatory offered to him by Nikolai Rubinstein, Anton's brother. When Rimsky-Korsakov was offered a professorship at the Saint Petersburg Conservatory, it was to Tchaikovsky that he turned for advice and guidance. Later, when Rimsky-Korsakov was under pressure from his fellow nationalists for his change in attitude on music education and his own intensive studies in music, Tchaikovsky continued to support him morally, told him that he fully applauded what he was doing and admired both his artistic modesty and his strength of character. In the 1880s, long after the members of The Five had gone their separate ways, another group called the Belyayev circle took up where they left off. Tchaikovsky enjoyed close relations with the leading members of this group—Alexander Glazunov, Anatoly Lyadov and, by then, Rimsky-Korsakov.

== Prologue: growing debate ==
With the exception of Mikhail Glinka, who became the first "truly Russian" composer, the only music indigenous to Russia before Tchaikovsky's birthday in 1840 were folk and sacred music; the Russian Orthodox Church's proscription of secular music had effectively stifled its development. Beginning in the 1830s, Russian intelligentsia debated the issue of whether artists negated their Russianness when they borrowed from European culture or took vital steps toward renewing and developing Russian culture. Two groups sought to answer this question. Slavophiles idealized Russian history before Peter the Great and claimed the country possessed a distinct culture, rooted in Byzantium and spread by the Russian Orthodox Church. The Zapadniki ("Westernizers"), on the other hand, lauded Peter as a patriot who wanted to reform his country and bring it on a par with Europe. Looking forward instead of backward, they saw Russia as a youthful and inexperienced but with the potential of becoming the most advanced European civilization by borrowing from Europe and turning its liabilities into assets.

In 1836, Glinka's opera A Life for the Tsar was premiered in Saint Petersburg. This was an event long-awaited by the intelligentsia. The opera was the first conceived by a Russian composer on a grand scale, set to a Russian text and patriotic in its appeal. Its plot fit neatly into the doctrine of Official Nationality being promulgated by Nicholas I, thus assuring Imperial approval. In formal and stylistic terms, A Life was very much an Italian opera but also showed a sophisticated thematic structure and a boldness in orchestral scoring. It was the first tragic opera to enter the Russian repertoire, with Ivan Susanin's death at the end underlining and adding gravitas to the patriotism running through the whole opera. (In Cavos's version, Ivan is spared at the last minute.) It was also the first Russian opera where the music continued throughout, uninterrupted by spoken dialogue. Moreover—and this is what amazed contemporaries about the work—the music included folk songs and Russian national idioms, incorporating them into the drama. Glinka meant his use of folk songs to reflect the presence of popular characters in the opera, rather than an overt attempt at nationalism. Nor do they play a major part in the opera. Nevertheless, despite a few derogatory comments about Glinka's use of "coachman's music," A Life became popular enough to earn obtain permanent repertory status, the first Russian opera to do so in that country.

Ironically, the success of Rossini's Semiramide earlier the same season was what allowed A Life to be staged at all, with virtually all the cast from Semiramide retained for A Life. Despite A Life's success, the furor over Semiramide aroused an overwhelming demand for Italian opera. This proved a setback for Russian opera in general and particularly for Glinka's next opera, Ruslan and Lyudmila when it was produced in 1842. Its failure prompted Glinka to leave Russia; he died in exile.

== Drawing sides ==
Despite Glinka's international attention, which included the admiration of Liszt and Berlioz for his music and his heralding by the latter as "among the outstanding composers of his time", Russian aristocrats remained focused exclusively on foreign music. Music itself was bound by class structure, and except for a modest role in public life was still considered a privilege of the aristocracy. Nobles spent enormous sums on musical performances for their exclusive enjoyment and hosted visiting artists such as Clara Schumann and Franz Liszt but there were no ongoing concert societies, no critical press and no public eagerly anticipating new works. No competent level of music education existed. Private tutors were available in some cities but tended to be badly trained. Anyone desiring a quality education had to travel abroad. Composer and pianist Anton Rubinstein's founding of the Russian Musical Society in 1859 and the Saint Petersburg Conservatory three years later were giant steps toward remedying this situation but also proved highly controversial ones. Among this group was a young legal clerk named Pyotr Ilyich Tchaikovsky.

=== Tchaikovsky ===
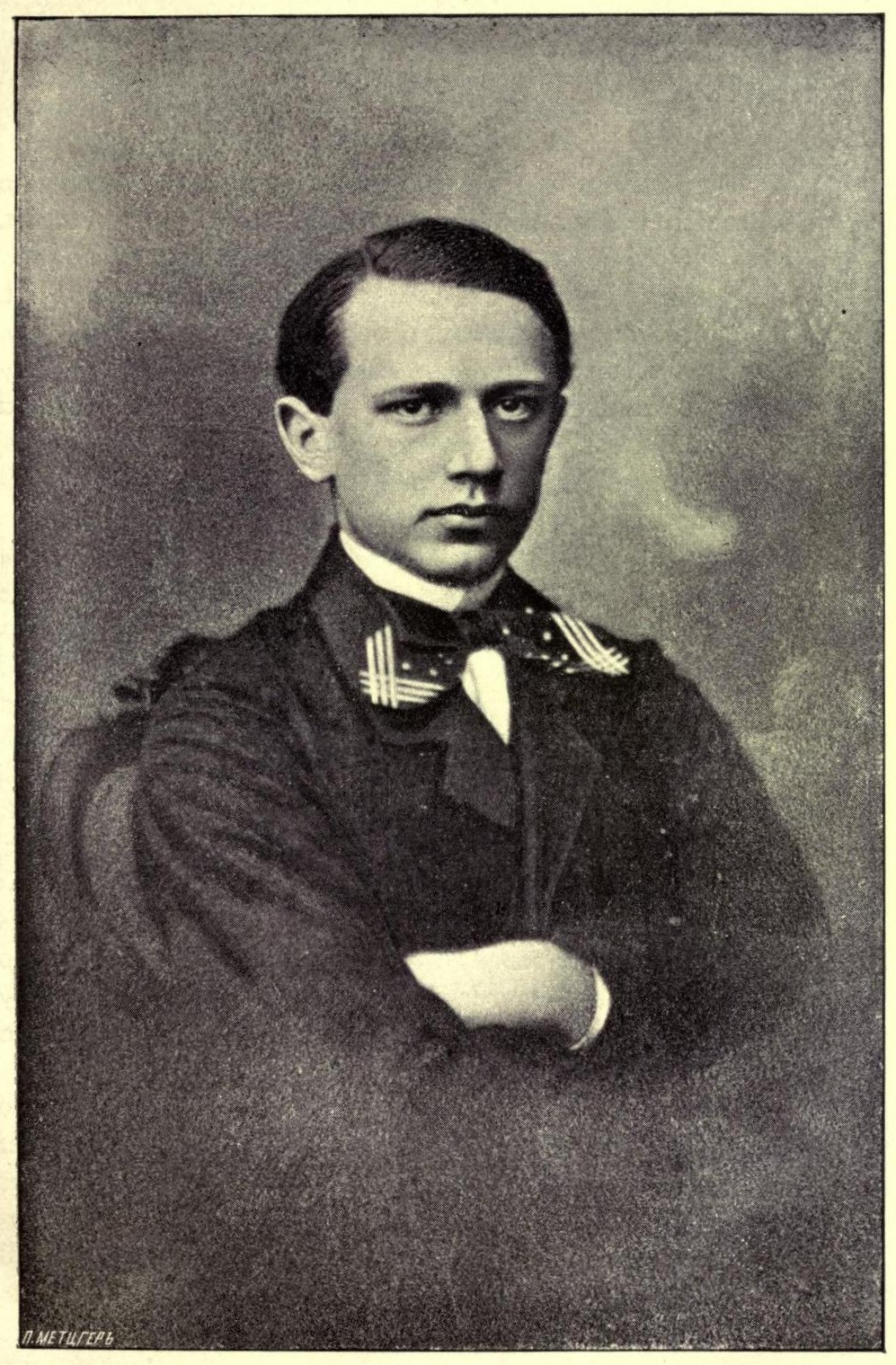
Tchaikovsky in his teens

Tchaikovsky was born in 1840 in Votkinsk, a small town in present-day Udmurtia, formerly the Imperial Russian province of Vyatka. A precocious pupil, he began piano lessons at the age of five, and could read music as adeptly as his teacher within three years. However, his parents' passion for his musical talent soon cooled. In 1850, the family decided to send Tchaikovsky to the Imperial School of Jurisprudence in Saint Petersburg. This establishment mainly served the lesser nobility or gentry, and would prepare him for a career as a civil servant. As the minimum age for acceptance was 12, Tchaikovsky was sent by his family to board at the Imperial School of Jurisprudence's preparatory school in Saint Petersburg, 800 miles (1,300 km) from his family home in Alapayevsk. Once Tchaikovsky came of age for acceptance, he was transferred to the Imperial School of Jurisprudence to begin a seven-year course of studies.

Music was not a priority at the School, but Tchaikovsky regularly attended the theater and the opera with other students. He was fond of works by Rossini, Bellini, Verdi and Mozart. Piano manufacturer Franz Becker made occasional visits to the School as a token music teacher. This was the only formal music instruction Tchaikovsky received there. From 1855 the composer's father, Ilya Tchaikovsky, funded private lessons with Rudolph Kündinger, a well-known piano teacher from Nuremberg, and questioned Kündinger about a musical career for his son. Kündinger replied that nothing suggested a potential composer or even a fine performer. Tchaikovsky was told to finish his course and then try for a post in the Ministry of Justice.

Tchaikovsky graduated on 25 May 1859 with the rank of titular counselor, a low rung on the civil service ladder. On 15 June, he was appointed to the Ministry of Justice in Saint Petersburg. Six months later he became a junior assistant and two months after that, a senior assistant. Tchaikovsky remained there for the rest of his three-year civil service career.

In 1861, Tchaikovsky attended classes in music theory organized by the Russian Musical Society and taught by Nikolai Zaremba. A year later he followed Zaremba to the Saint Petersburg Conservatory. Tchaikovsky would not give up his Ministry post "until I am quite certain that I am destined to be a musician rather than a civil servant." From 1862 to 1865 he studied harmony, counterpoint and fugue with Zaremba, while Rubinstein taught him instrumentation and composition. In 1863 he abandoned his civil service career and studied music full-time, graduating in December 1865.

=== The Five ===
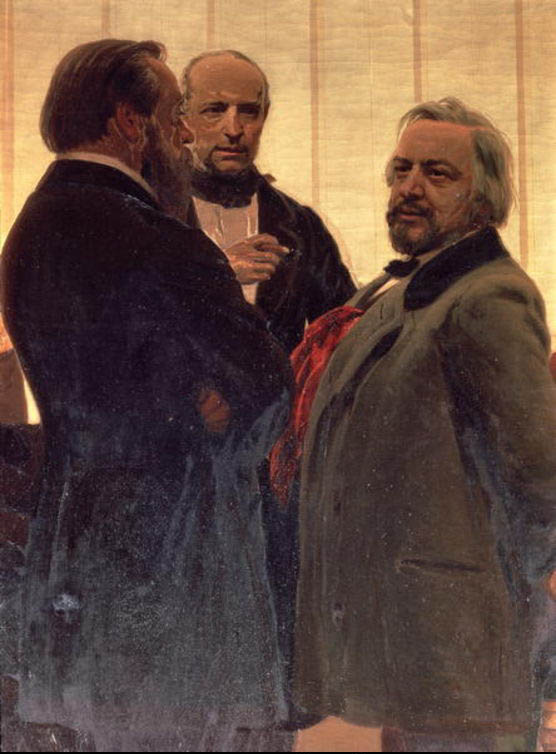
Portrait of (left to right) Mily Balakirev, Vladimir Odoyevsky and Mikhail Glinka by Ilya Repin

Around Christmas 1855, Glinka was visited by Alexander Ulybyshev, a rich Russian amateur critic, and his 18-year-old protégé Mily Balakirev, who was reportedly on his way to becoming a great pianist. Balakirev played his fantasy based on themes from A Life for the Tsar for Glinka. Glinka, pleasantly surprised, praised Balakirev as a musician with a bright future.

In 1856, Balakirev and critic Vladimir Stasov, who publicly espoused a nationalist agenda for Russian arts, started gathering young composers through whom to spread ideas and gain a following. First to meet with them that year was César Cui, an army officer who specialized in the science of fortifications. Modest Mussorgsky, a Preobrazhensky Lifeguard officer, joined them in 1857; Nikolai Rimsky-Korsakov, a naval cadet, in 1861; and Alexander Borodin, a chemist, in 1862. Balakirev, Borodin, Cui, Mussorgsky and Rimsky-Korsakov composed in their spare time, and all five of them were young men in 1862, with Rimsky-Korsakov at just 18 the youngest and Borodin the oldest at 28. All five were essentially self-taught and eschewed conservative and "routine" musical techniques. They became known as the kuchka, variously translated as The Five, The Russian Five and The Mighty Handful after a review written by Stasov about their music. Stasov wrote, "May God grant that [the audience retains] for ever a memory of how much poetry, feeling, talent and ability is possessed by the small but already mighty handful [moguchaya kuchka] of Russian musicians". The term moguchaya kuchka, which literally means "mighty little heap", stuck, although Stasov referred to them in print generally as the "New Russian School."

The aim of this group was to create an independent Russian school of music in the footsteps of Glinka. They were to strive for "national character," gravitate toward "Oriental" (by that they meant near-Eastern) melodies and favor program music over absolute—in other words, symphonic poems and related music over symphonies, concertos and chamber music. To create this Russian style of classical music, Stasov wrote that the group incorporated four characteristics. The first was a rejection of academicism and fixed Western forms of composition. The second was the incorporation of musical elements from eastern nations inside the Russian empire; this was a quality that would later become known as musical orientalism. The third was a progressive and anti-academic approach to music. The fourth was the incorporation of compositional devices linked with folk music. These four points would distinguish the Five from its contemporaries in the cosmopolitan camp of composition.

=== Rubinstein and the Conservatory ===
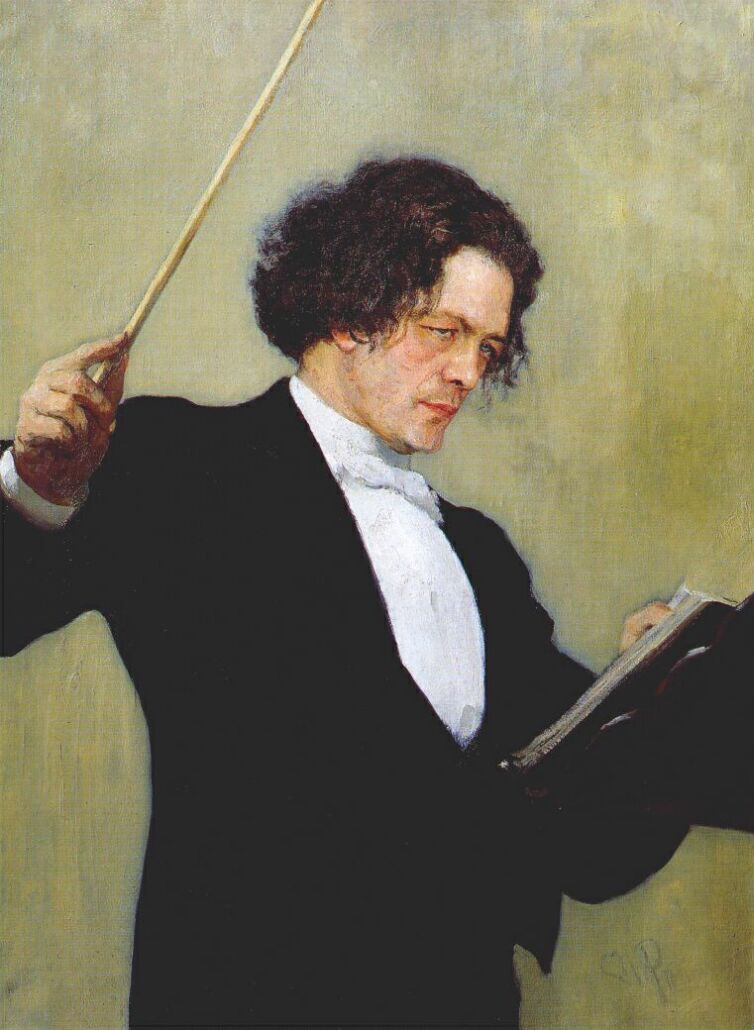
Anton Rubinstein on the podium as portrayed by Ilya Repin

Anton Rubinstein was a famous Russian pianist who had lived, performed and composed in Western and Central Europe before he returned to Russia in 1858. He saw Russia as a musical desert compared to Paris, Berlin and Leipzig, whose music conservatories he had visited. Musical life flourished in those places; composers were held in high regard, and musicians were wholeheartedly devoted to their art. With a similar ideal in mind for Russia, he had conceived an idea for a conservatory in Russia years before his 1858 return, and had finally aroused the interest of influential people to help him realize the idea.

Rubinstein's first step was to found the Russian Musical Society (RMS) in 1859. Its objectives were to educate people in music, cultivate their musical tastes and develop their talents in that area of their lives. The first priority of the RMS acted was to expose to the public the music of native composers. In addition to a considerable amount of Western European music, works by Mussorgsky and Cui were premiered by the RMS under Rubinstein's baton. A few weeks after the Society's premiere concert, Rubinstein started organizing music classes, which were open to everyone. Interest in these classes grew until Rubinstein founded the Saint Petersburg Conservatory in 1862.

According to musicologist Francis Maes, Rubinstein could not be accused of any lack of artistic integrity. He fought for change and progress in musical life in Russia. Only his musical tastes were conservative—from Haydn, Mozart and Beethoven to the early Romantics up to Chopin. Liszt and Wagner were not included. Neither did he welcome many ideas then new about music, including the role of nationalism in classical music. For Rubinstein, national music existed only in folk song and folk dance. There was no place for national music in larger works, especially not in opera. Rubinstein's public reaction to the attacks was simply not to react. His classes and concerts were well attended, so he felt no reply was actually necessary. He even forbade his students to take sides.

== With The Five ==
As The Five's campaign against Rubinstein continued in the press, Tchaikovsky found himself almost as much a target as his former teacher. Cui reviewed the performance of Tchaikovsky's graduation cantata and lambasted the composer as "utterly feeble.... If he had any talent at all ... it would surely at some point in the piece have broken free of the chains imposed by the Conservatory." The review's effect on the sensitive composer was devastating. Eventually, an uneasy truce developed as Tchaikovsky became friendly with Balakirev and eventually with the other four composers of the group. A working relationship between Balakirev and Tchaikovsky resulted in Romeo and Juliet. The Five's approval of this work was further followed by their enthusiasm for Tchaikovsky's Second Symphony. Subtitled the Little Russian (Little Russia was the term at that time for what is now called Ukraine) for its use of Ukrainian folk songs, the symphony in its initial version also used several compositional devices similar to those used by the Five in their work. Stasov suggested the subject of Shakespeare's The Tempest to Tchaikovsky, who wrote a tone poem based on this subject. After a lapse of several years, Balakirev reentered Tchaikovsky's creative life; the result was Tchaikovsky's Manfred Symphony, composed to a program after Lord Byron originally written by Stasov and supplied by Balakirev. Overall, however, Tchaikovsky continued down an independent creative path, traveling a middle course between those of his nationalistic peers and the traditionalists.

=== Balakirev ===
==== Initial correspondence ====
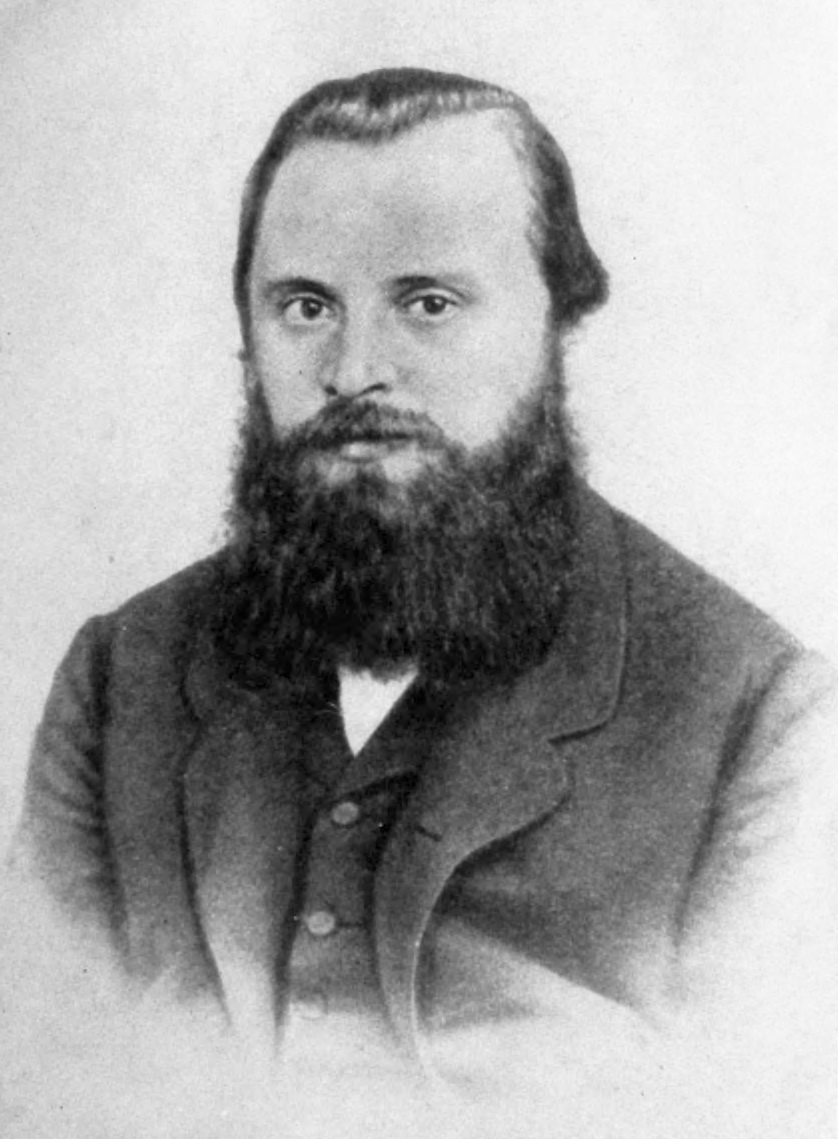
The young Mily Balakirev

In 1867, Rubinstein handed over the directorship of the Conservatory to Zaremba. Later that year he resigned his conductorship of the Russian Music Society orchestra, to be replaced by Balakirev. Tchaikovsky had already promised his Characteristic Dances (then called Dances of the Hay Maidens) from his opera The Voyevoda to the society. In submitting the manuscript (and perhaps mindful of Cui's review of the cantata), Tchaikovsky included a note to Balakirev that ended with a request for a word of encouragement should the Dances not be performed.

At this point The Five as a unit was dispersing. Mussorgsky and Rimsky-Korsakov wanted to remove themselves from Balakirev's influence, which they now found stifling, and go in their individual directions as composers. Balakirev might have sensed a potential new disciple in Tchaikovsky. He explained in his reply from Saint Petersburg that while he preferred to give his opinions in person and at length to press his points home, he was couching his reply "with complete frankness", adding, with a deft touch of flattery, that he felt that Tchaikovsky was "a fully fledged artist" and that he looked forward to discussing the piece with him on an upcoming trip to Moscow.

These letters set the tone for Tchaikovsky's relationship with Balakirev over the next two years. At the end of this period, in 1869, Tchaikovsky was a 28-year-old professor at the Moscow Conservatory. Having written his first symphony and an opera, he next composed a symphonic poem entitled Fatum. Initially pleased with the piece when Nikolai Rubinstein conducted it in Moscow, Tchaikovsky dedicated it to Balakirev and sent it to him to conduct in Saint Petersburg. Fatum received only a lukewarm reception there. Balakirev wrote a detailed letter to Tchaikovsky in which he explained what he felt were defects in Fatum but also gave some encouragement. He added that he considered the dedication of the music to him as "precious to me as a sign of your sympathy towards me—and I feel a great weakness for you". Tchaikovsky was too self-critical not to see the truth behind these comments. He accepted Balakirev's criticism, and the two continued to correspond. Tchaikovsky would later destroy the score of Fatum. (The score would be reconstructed posthumously by using the orchestral parts.)

==== Writing Romeo and Juliet ====
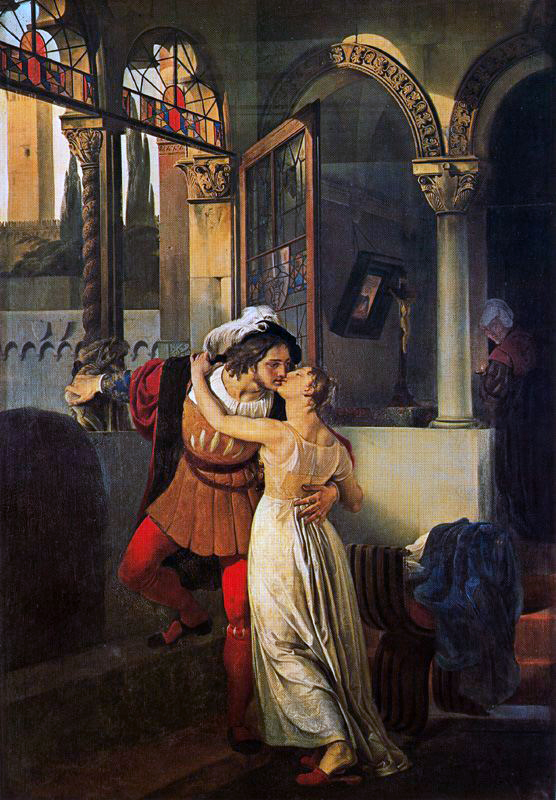
Balakirev was instrumental in creating Romeo and Juliet. The Last Kiss of Romeo and Juliet by Francesco Hayez, 1823.

Balakirev's despotism strained the relationship between him and Tchaikovsky but both men still appreciated each other's abilities. Despite their friction, Balakirev proved the only man to persuade Tchaikovsky to rewrite a work several times, as he would with Romeo and Juliet. At Balakirev's suggestion, Tchaikovsky based the work on Balakirev's King Lear, a tragic overture in sonata form after the example of Beethoven's concert overtures. It was Tchaikovsky's idea to reduce the plot to one central conflict and represent it musically with the binary structure of sonata form. However, the execution of that plot in the music we know today came only after two radical revisions. Balakirev discarded many of the early drafts Tchaikovsky sent him and, with the flurry of suggestions between the two men, the piece was constantly in the mail between Moscow and Saint Petersburg.

Tchaikovsky allowed the first version to be premiered by Nikolai Rubinstein on 16 March 1870, after the composer had incorporated only some of Balakirev's suggestions. The premiere was a disaster. Stung by this rejection, Tchaikovsky took Balakirev's strictures to heart. He forced himself to reach beyond his musical training and rewrote much of the music into the form we know it today. Romeo would bring Tchaikovsky his first national and international acclaim and become a work the kuchka lauded unconditionally. On hearing the love theme from Romeo, Stasov told the group, "There were five of you; now there are six". Such was the enthusiasm of the Five for Romeo that at their gatherings Balakirev was always asked to play it through at the piano. He did this so many times that he learned to perform it from memory.

Some critics, among them Tchaikovsky biographers Lawrence and Elisabeth Hanson, have wondered what would have happened if Tchaikovsky had joined Balakirev in 1862 instead of attending the Conservatory. They suggest that he might have developed much more quickly as an independent composer, and offer as proof the fact that Tchaikovsky did not write his first wholly distinct work until Balakirev goaded and inspired him to write Romeo. How well Tchaikovsky might have developed in the long run is another matter. He owed much of his musical ability, including his skill at orchestration, to the thorough grounding in counterpoint, harmony and musical theory he received at the Conservatory. Without that grounding, Tchaikovsky might not have been able to write what would become his greatest works.

=== Rimsky-Korsakov ===
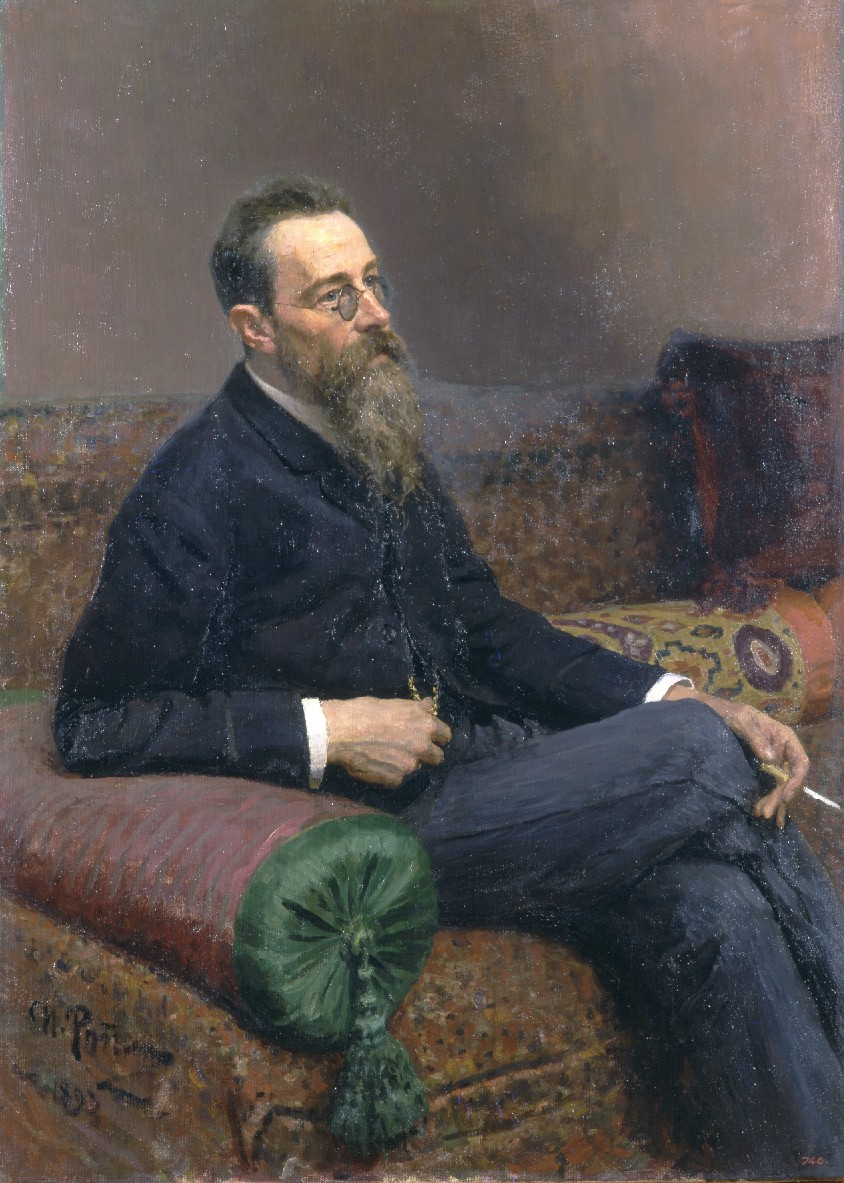
Portrait of Rimsky-Korsakov by Ilya Repin

In 1871, Nikolai Zaremba resigned from the directorship of the Saint Petersburg Conservatory. His successor, Mikhaíl Azanchevsky, was more progressive-minded musically and wanted new blood to freshen up teaching in the Conservatory. He offered Rimsky-Korsakov a professorship in Practical Composition and Instrumentation (orchestration), as well as leadership of the Orchestra Class. Balakirev, who had formerly opposed academicism with tremendous vigor, encouraged him to assume the post, thinking it might be useful having one of his own in the midst of the enemy camp.

Nevertheless, by the time of his appointment, Rimsky-Korsakov had become painfully aware of his technical shortcomings as a composer; he later wrote, "I was a dilettante and knew nothing". Moreover, he had come to a creative dead-end upon completing his opera The Maid of Pskov and realized that developing a solid musical technique was the only way he could continue composing. He turned to Tchaikovsky for advice and guidance. When Rimsky-Korsakov underwent a change in attitude on music education and began his own intensive studies privately, his fellow nationalists accused him of throwing away his Russian heritage to compose fugues and sonatas. Tchaikovsky continued to support him morally. He told Rimsky-Korsakov that he fully applauded what he was doing and admired both his artistic modesty and his strength of character.

Before Rimsky-Korsakov went to the Conservatory, in March 1868, Tchaikovsky wrote a review of his Fantasy on Serbian Themes. In discussing this work, Tchaikovsky compared it to the only other Rimsky-Korsakov piece he had heard so far, the First Symphony, mentioning "its charming orchestration ... its structural novelty, and most of all ... the freshness of its purely Russian harmonic turns ... immediately [showing] Mr. Rimsky-Korsakov to be a remarkable symphonic talent". Tchaikovsky's notice, worded in precisely a way to find favor within the Balakirev circle, did exactly that. He met the rest of The Five on a visit to Balakirev's house in Saint Petersburg the following month. The meeting went well. Rimsky-Korsakov later wrote,

As a product of the Conservatory, Tchaikovsky was viewed rather negligently if not haughtily by our circle, and, owing to his being away from St. Petersburg, personal acquaintanceship was impossible.... [Tchaikovsky] proved to be a pleasing and sympathetic man to talk with, one who knew how to be simple of manner and always speak with evident sincerity and heartiness. The evening of our first meeting [Tchaikovsky] played for us, at Balakirev's request, the first movement of his Symphony in G minor [Tchaikovsky's First Symphony]; it proved quite to our liking; and our former opinion of him changed and gave way to a more sympathetic one, although Tchaikovsky's Conservatory training still constituted a considerable barrier between him and us.

Rimsky-Korsakov added that "during the following years, when visiting St. Petersburg, [Tchaikovsky] usually came to Balakirev's, and we saw him." Nevertheless, as much as Tchaikovsky may have desired acceptance from both The Five and the traditionalists, he needed the independence that Moscow afforded to find his own direction, away from both parties. This was especially true in light of Rimsky-Korsakov's comment about the "considerable barrier" of Tchaikovsky's Conservatory training, as well as Anton Rubinstein's opinion that Tchaikovsky had strayed too far from the examples of the great Western masters. Tchaikovsky was ready for the nourishment of new attitudes and styles so he could continue growing as a composer, and his brother Modest writes that he was impressed by the "force and vitality" in some of the Five's work. However, he was too balanced an individual to totally reject the best in the music and values that Zaremba and Rubinstein had cherished. In his brother Modest's opinion, Tchaikovsky's relations with the Saint Petersburg group resembled "those between two friendly neighboring states ... cautiously prepared to meet on common ground, but jealously guarding their separate interests".

=== Stasov and the Little Russian symphony ===
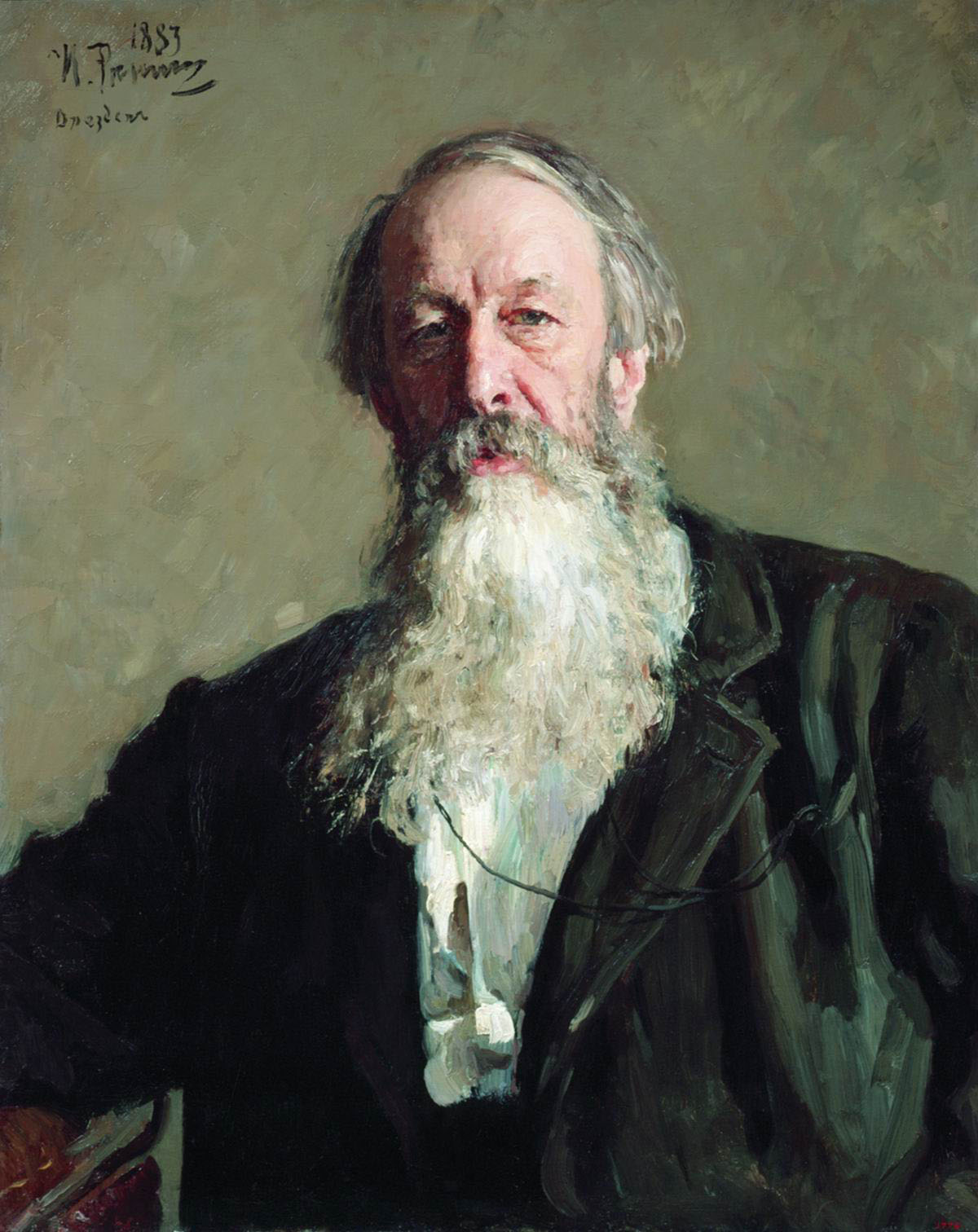
Vladimir Stasov's portrait by Ilya Repin

Tchaikovsky played the finale of his Second Symphony, subtitled the Little Russian, at a gathering at Rimsky-Korsakov's house in Saint Petersburg on 7 January 1873, before the official premiere of the entire work. To his brother Modest, he wrote, "[T]he whole company almost tore me to pieces with rapture—and Madame Rimskaya-Korsakova begged me in tears to let her arrange it for piano duet". Rimskaya-Korsakova was a noted pianist, composer and arranger in her own right, transcribing works by other members of the kuchka as well as those of her husband and Tchaikovsky's Romeo and Juliet. Borodin was present and may have approved of the work himself. Also present was Vladimir Stasov. Impressed by what he had heard, Stasov asked Tchaikovsky what he would consider writing next, and would soon influence the composer in writing the symphonic poem The Tempest.

What endeared the Little Russian to the kuchka was not simply that Tchaikovsky had used Ukrainian folk songs as melodic material. It was how, especially in the outer movements, he allowed the unique characteristics of Russian folk song to dictate symphonic form. This was a goal toward which the kuchka strived, both collectively and individually. Tchaikovsky, with his Conservatory grounding, could sustain such development longer and more cohesively than his colleagues in the kuchka. (Though the comparison may seem unfair, Tchaikovsky authority David Brown has pointed out that, because of their similar time-frames, the finale of the Little Russian shows what Mussorgsky could have done with "The Great Gate of Kiev" from Pictures at an Exhibition had he possessed academic training comparable to that of Tchaikovsky.)

=== Tchaikovsky's private concerns about The Five ===
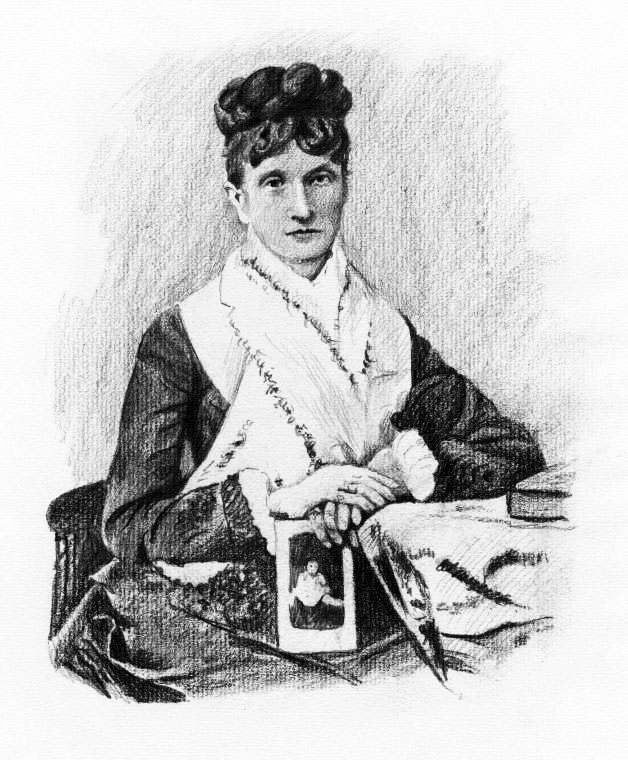
Nadezhda von Meck, Tchaikovsky's patroness and confidante from 1877 to 1890

The Five was among the myriad of subjects Tchaikovsky discussed with his benefactress, Nadezhda von Meck. By January 1878, when he wrote to Mrs. von Meck about its members, he had drifted far from their musical world and ideals. In addition, The Five's finest days had long passed. Despite considerable effort in writing operas and songs, Cui had become better known as a critic than as a composer, and even his critical efforts competed for time with his career as an army engineer and expert in the science of fortification. Balakirev had withdrawn completely from the musical scene, Mussorgsky was sinking ever deeper into alcoholism, and Borodin's creative activities increasingly took a back seat to his official duties as a professor of chemistry.

Only Rimsky-Korsakov actively pursued a full-time musical career, and he was under increasing fire from his fellow nationalists for much the same reason as Tchaikovsky had been. Like Tchaikovsky, Rimsky-Korsakov had found that, for his own artistic growth to continue unabated, he had to study and master Western classical forms and techniques. Borodin called it "apostasy", adding, "Many are grieved at present by the fact that Korsakov has turned back, has thrown himself into a study of musical antiquity. I do not bemoan it. It is understandable...." Mussorgsky was harsher: "[T]he mighty kuchka had degenerated into soulless traitors."

Tchaikovsky's analysis of each of The Five was unsparing. According to Brown, while at least some of his observations may seem distorted and prejudiced, he also mentions some details which ring clear and true. His diagnosis of Rimsky-Korsakov's creative crisis is very accurate. He also calls Mussorgsky the most gifted musically of the Five, though Tchaikovsky could not appreciate the forms Mussorgsky's originality took. Nonetheless, Brown concludes that he badly underestimates Borodin's technique and gives Balakirev far less than his full due—all the more telling in light of Balakirev's help in conceiving and shaping Romeo and Juliet.

Tchaikovsky wrote to Nadezhda von Meck that all of the kuchka were talented but also "infected to the core" with conceit and "a purely dilettantish confidence in their superiority." He went into some detail about Rimsky-Korsakov's epiphany and turnaround regarding musical training, and his efforts to remedy this situation for himself. Tchaikovsky then called Cui "a talented dilettante" whose music "has no originality, but is clever and graceful"; Borodin a man who "has talent, even a strong one, but it has perished through neglect ... and his technique is so weak that he cannot write a single line [of music] without outside help"; Mussorgsky "a hopeless case", superior in talent but "narrow-minded, devoid of any urge towards self-perfection"; and Balakirev as one with "enormous talent" yet who had also "done much harm" as "the general inventor of all the theories of this strange group".

=== Balakirev returns ===
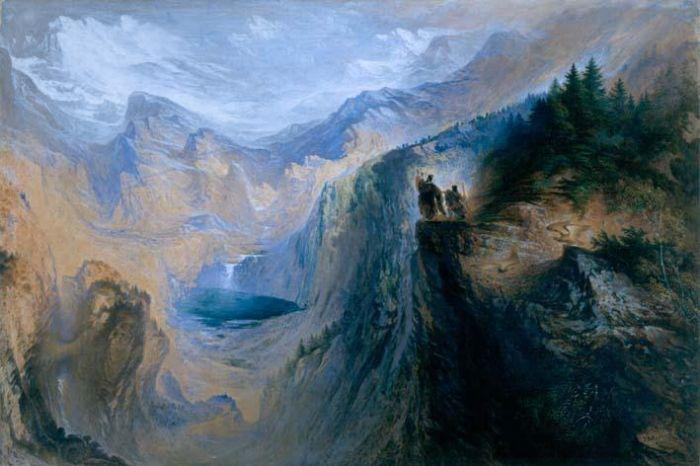
Manfred on the Jungfrau (1837) by John Martin

Tchaikovsky finished his final revision of Romeo and Juliet in 1880, and felt it a courtesy to send a copy of the score to Balakirev. Balakirev, however, had dropped out of the music scene in the early 1870s and Tchaikovsky had lost touch with him. He asked the publisher Bessel to forward a copy to Balakirev. A year later Balakirev replied. In the same letter that he thanked Tchaikovsky profusely for the score, Balakirev suggested "the programme for a symphony which you would handle wonderfully well", a detailed plan for a symphony based on Lord Byron's Manfred. Originally drafted by Stasov in 1868 for Hector Berlioz as a sequel to that composer's Harold en Italie, the program had since been in Balakirev's care.

Tchaikovsky declined the project at first, saying the subject left him cold. Balakirev persisted. "You must, of course, make an effort", Balakirev exhorted, "take a more self-critical approach, don't hurry things". Tchaikovsky's mind was changed two years later, in the Swiss Alps, while tending to his friend Iosif Kotek and after he had re-read Manfred in the milieu in which the poem is set. Once he returned home, Tchaikovsky revised the draft Balakirev had made from Stasov's program and began sketching the first movement.

The Manfred Symphony would cost Tchaikovsky more time, effort and soul-searching than anything else he would write, even the Pathetique Symphony. It also became the longest, most complex work he had written up to that point, and though it owes an obvious debt to Berlioz due to its program, Tchaikovsky was still able to make the theme of Manfred his own. Near the end of seven months of intensive effort, in late September 1885, he wrote Balakirev, "Never in my life, believe me, have I labored so long and hard, and felt so drained by my efforts. The Symphony is written in four movements, as per your program, although—forgive me—as much as I wanted to, I have not been able to keep all the keys and modulations you suggested ... It is of course dedicated to you".

Once he had finished the symphony, Tchaikovsky was reluctant to further tolerate Balakirev's interference, and severed all contact; he told his publisher P. Jurgenson that he considered Balakirev a "madman". Tchaikovsky and Balakirev exchanged only a few formal, not overly friendly letters after this breach.

== Belyayev circle ==
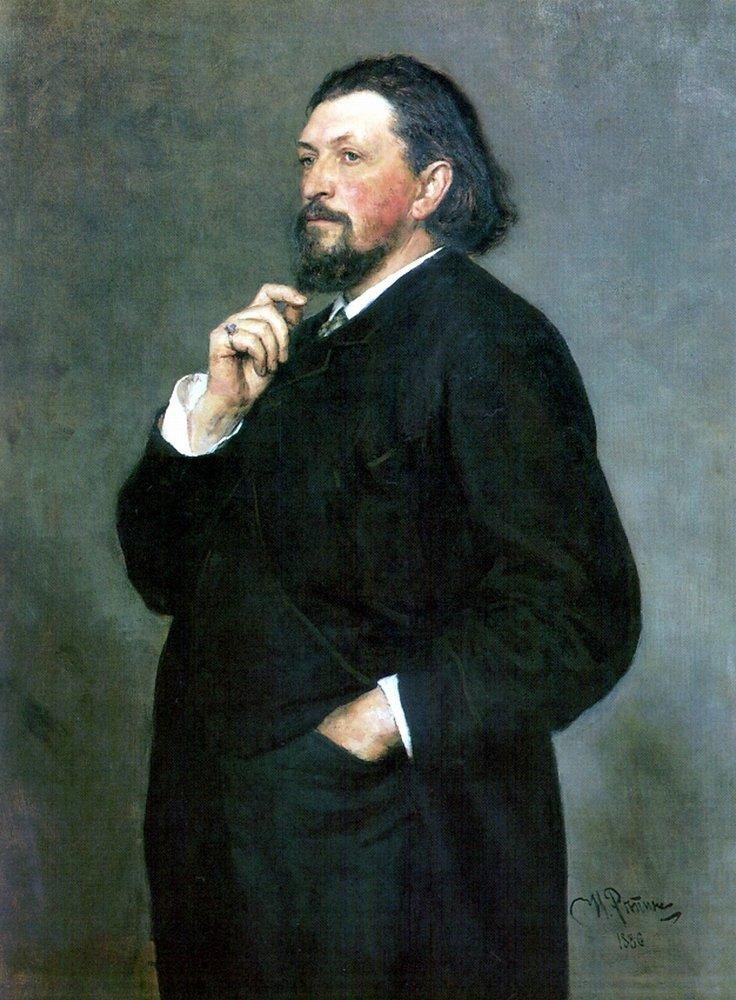
Portrait of Mitrofan Belyayev by Ilya Repin

In November 1887, Tchaikovsky arrived in Saint Petersburg in time to hear several of the Russian Symphony Concerts, one of which included the first complete performance of the final version of his First Symphony and another the premiere of the revised version of Rimsky-Korsakov's Third Symphony. Before this visit he had spent much time keeping in touch with Rimsky-Korsakov and those around him. Rimsky-Korsakov, along with Alexander Glazunov, Anatoly Lyadov and several other nationalistically-minded composers and musicians, had formed a group called the Belyayev circle. This group was named after timber merchant Mitrofan Belyayev, an amateur musician who became an influential music patron and publisher after he had taken an interest in Glazunov's work. During Tchaikovsky's visit, he spent much time in the company of these men, and his somewhat fraught relationship with The Five would meld into a more harmonious one with the Belyayev circle. This relationship would last until his death in late 1893.

As for The Five, the group had long since dispersed, Mussorgsky had died in 1881 and Borodin had followed in 1887. Cui continued to write negative reviews of Tchaikovsky's music but was seen by the composer as merely a critical irritant. Balakirev lived in isolation and was confined to the musical sidelines. Only Rimsky-Korsakov remained fully active as a composer.

A side benefit of Tchaikovsky's friendship with Glazunov, Lyadov and Rimsky-Korsakov was an increased confidence in his own abilities as a composer, along with a willingness to let his musical works stand alongside those of his contemporaries. Tchaikovsky wrote to von Meck in January 1889, after being once again well represented in Belyayev's concerts, that he had "always tried to place myself outside all parties and to show in every way possible that I love and respect every honorable and gifted public figure in music, whatever his tendency", and that he considered himself "flattered to appear on the concert platform" beside composers in the Belyayev circle. This was an acknowledgment of wholehearted readiness for his music to be heard with that of these composers, delivered in a tone of implicit confidence that there were no comparisons from which to fear.

== Legacy ==
The initial hostility of The Five against Tchaikovsky was mitigated by Tchaikovsky's improved relationships, first with Balakirev and then with Rimsky-Korsakov. The latter substantially embraced the cosmopolitan conservatory-based approach, as distinct from pure Russian nationalism. The Five dispersed as a unit, but were replaced by the Belyayev circle of younger composers that grew around Rimsky-Korsakov. This group, while writing in a nationalistic style pioneered by Rimsky-Korsakov and Balakirev, was much more accommodating of Western compositional practices as personified by the music of Tchaikovsky. In an 1882 letter to a Russian critic, Tchaikovsky argued:

It is not important that European audiences applauded me but that all Russian music and Russian art were received with enthusiasm in my person. The Russians ought to know that a Russian musician has held the banner of our art high in the big European centers.

Tchaikovsky’s defense of his regard for Western musical forms in the success of his representation is reminiscent of George Lipsitz’s points on bifocality, or, a culture’s self-perception happening in tandem with an active consciousness about how other cultures perceive them.

In an open letter to Serge Diaghilev in 1921, Stravinsky wrote on Tchaikovsky:

Chaikovsky’s music, which does not appear specifically Russian to everybody, is often more profoundly Russian than music which has long since been awarded the facile label of Muscovite picturesqueness. This music is quite as Russian as Pushkin’s verse or Glinka’s song. While not specifically cultivating in his art the ‘soul of the Russian peasant’, Chaikovsky drew unconsciously from the true, popular sources of our race.

And in a 1924 interview on the 1812 Overture, Stravinsky voiced a similarly strong opinion on Tchaikovsky's representation, one The Five would have thought unlikely:

No, 1812 is rather hackneyed… pompier, as the French would say. But Nutcracker, Eugene Onegin, The Queen of Spades, and sections of some of his symphonies are of incomparable rhythmic beauty. Have you noticed the orchestration, so delicate and so original, in Nutcracker? I think criticism has been unfair regarding Tchaikovsky: the admiration that persons of bad taste felt for his work has harmed his reputation among critics. Tchaikovsky is very easy, and for this reason he has been considered common. In reality, he is the most Russian composer of all the musicians of my country.

Rimsky-Korsakov wrote about the changes in the Belyayev group:

At this time [approximately 1892] there begins to be noticeable a considerable cooling off and even somewhat inimical attitude toward the memory of the "mighty kuchka" of Balakirev's period. On the contrary a worship of Tchaikovsky and a tendency toward eclecticism grow even stronger. Nor could one help noticing the predilection (that sprang up then in our circle) for Italian-French music of the time of wig and farthingale [that is, the eighteenth century], music introduced by Tchaikovsky in his Queen of Spades and Iolanthe. By this time quite an accretion of new elements and young blood had accumulated in Belyayev's circle. New times, new birds, new songs.

As a result of this influence plus their academic training from Rimsky-Korsakov, especially in the cases of Anton Arensky and Glazunov, these composers combined the best compositional techniques of The Five and Tchaikovsky in their music. Often, however, composers in this group fell back on two sources—musical clichés and mannerisms handed down from The Five, and academic compositional techniques learned at the Conservatory. Also, the eclecticism about which Rimsky-Korsakov wrote tended to overpower originality in many works, including those of Glazunov. Nevertheless, the Belyayev circle continued to influence the development of Russian music well into the 20th century.
