= Russian Easter Festival Overture =

Orchestral piece by Rimsky-Korsakov

- Overture on Liturgical Themes
- by Nikolai Rimsky-Korsakov
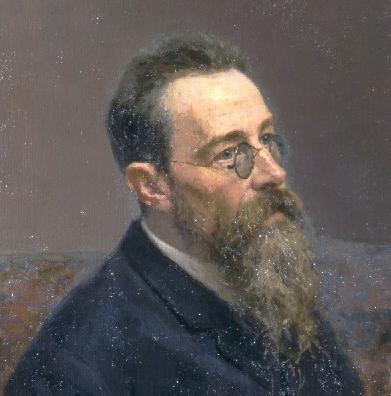
- The composer in 1893, portrayed by Ilya Repin
- Native name: Russian: Светлый праздник
- Opus: 36
- Composed: 1887–88
- Dedication: memories of Modest Mussorgsky and Alexander Borodin
- Scoring: orchestra

Premiere
- Date: 15 Dec 1888

Russian Easter Festival Overture (15:35)
Performed by the Czech National Symphony Orchestra

Russian Easter Festival Overture: Overture on Liturgical Themes (Russian: Светлый праздник, romanized: Svetly prazdnik, lit. 'Bright festival'), Op. 36, also known as the Great Russian Easter Overture, is a concert overture written by the Russian composer Nikolai Rimsky-Korsakov between August 1887 and April 1888. It was dedicated to the memories of Modest Mussorgsky and Alexander Borodin, two members of the group of composers known in English as "The Five". It is the last of what many call his three most exceptionally brilliant orchestral works, preceded by Capriccio Espagnol and Scheherazade.

The work received its premiere at a Russian symphony concert in St. Petersburg on 15 December [O.S. 3 December] 1888.

== Instrumentation ==
The overture is scored for a Romantic period-sized orchestra, consisting of 3 flutes (1 doubling piccolo), 2 oboes, 2 clarinets in C, 2 bassoons, 4 horns in F, 2 trumpets in B♭, 3 trombones, tuba, 3 timpani tuned to A, D and G, percussion (glockenspiel, triangle, cymbals, bass drum, tam-tam), harp, and strings.

== Background ==
The score is prefaced by two quotations from the Old and New Testaments and a third, written by the composer; these correspond to each of the overture's three parts. The first part is prefaced by two verses from Psalm 68:1–2; the second from the Gospel of Mark 16:1–6; and a third by a description of the Easter celebration written by the composer.

The melodies in the overture are largely from the Russian Orthodox liturgy, based on a collection of old Russian Orthodox liturgical chants called the Obikhod.

Rimsky-Korsakov said in his autobiography that he was eager to reproduce "the legendary and heathen side of the holiday, the transition from the gloomy and mysterious evening of Passion Saturday to the unbridled pagan-religious merrymaking on Easter Sunday morning". He had always been interested in – and enjoyed – liturgical themes and music, though he was not a believer.

In Russian, Easter is known as the "Bright Holiday".

== Structure ==
The Russian Easter Festival Overture is mainly in sonata allegro form, with a lengthy introduction at the beginning. Throughout the piece, there are a number of prominent solo sections, featuring violin, cello, trombone, clarinet, and flute.

The opening section is written in 5/2 time, and is one of the more famous works for orchestra in quintuple meter. The final section of the piece is notated in 2/1 time, making occasional use of 3/1, and is one of very few orchestral works to use either of these time signatures.
