= Fantasy on Serbian Themes =

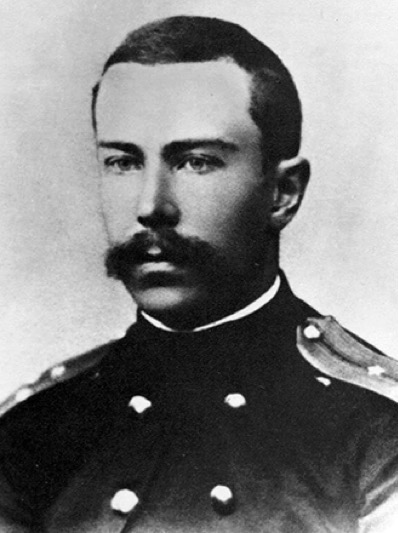
Rimsky-Korsakov in 1866

Nikolai Rimsky-Korsakov wrote his Fantasia on Serbian Themes, Op. 6, in 1867. Mily Balakirev conducted the first performance of this piece in May of that year. It is also known as the Serbian Fantasy.

The Fantasy was actually Balakirev's idea for the young Rimsky-Korsakov to compose. He requested the piece for a concert of pan-Slavonic music he had planned for May 24, 1867, programming his Czech Overture on the same billing. Balakirev also produced the Serbian themes for Rimsky-Korsakov to use in his composition. Rimsky-Korsakov confessed in his autobiography that it was not any feeling of nationalism or pan-Slavism that prompted him to write the Fantasy, but the beauty of the themes themselves. Nevertheless, Balakirev liked the piece, which Rimsky-Korsakov had written rapidly.

A March 1868 review of the Fantasy by Pyotr Ilyich Tchaikovsky, in which he also mentioned Rimsky-Korsakov's First Symphony, found favour within the Balakirev circle. Tchaikovsky mentioned the symphony's "charming orchestration ... its structural novelty, and most of all by the freshness of its purely Russian harmonic turns ... immediately [showing] Mr. Rimsky-Korsakov to be a remarkable symphonic talent." Tchaikovsky was already acquainted with Balakirev and was working with him on his fantasy overture Romeo and Juliet. The review opened the door for him to meet the other members of "The Five" face-to-face the following month.

In 1887 Rimsky-Korsakov revised the piece to prepare it for a new edition undertaken by Mitrofan Belyayev's publishing firm.

== Sources ==
- Brown, David, Tchaikovsky: The Early Years, 1840-1874 (New York: W.W. Norton & Company, 1978). ISBN 0-393-07535-4.
- Rimsky-Korsakov, Nikolai, Letoppis Moyey Muzykalnoy Zhizni (St. Petersburg, 1909), published in English as My Musical Life (New York: Knopf, 1925, 3rd ed. 1942). ISBN n/a.
