= Scheherazade (Rimsky-Korsakov) =

Symphonic poem by Rimsky-Korsakov

- Symphonic suite by Nikolai Rimsky-Korsakov
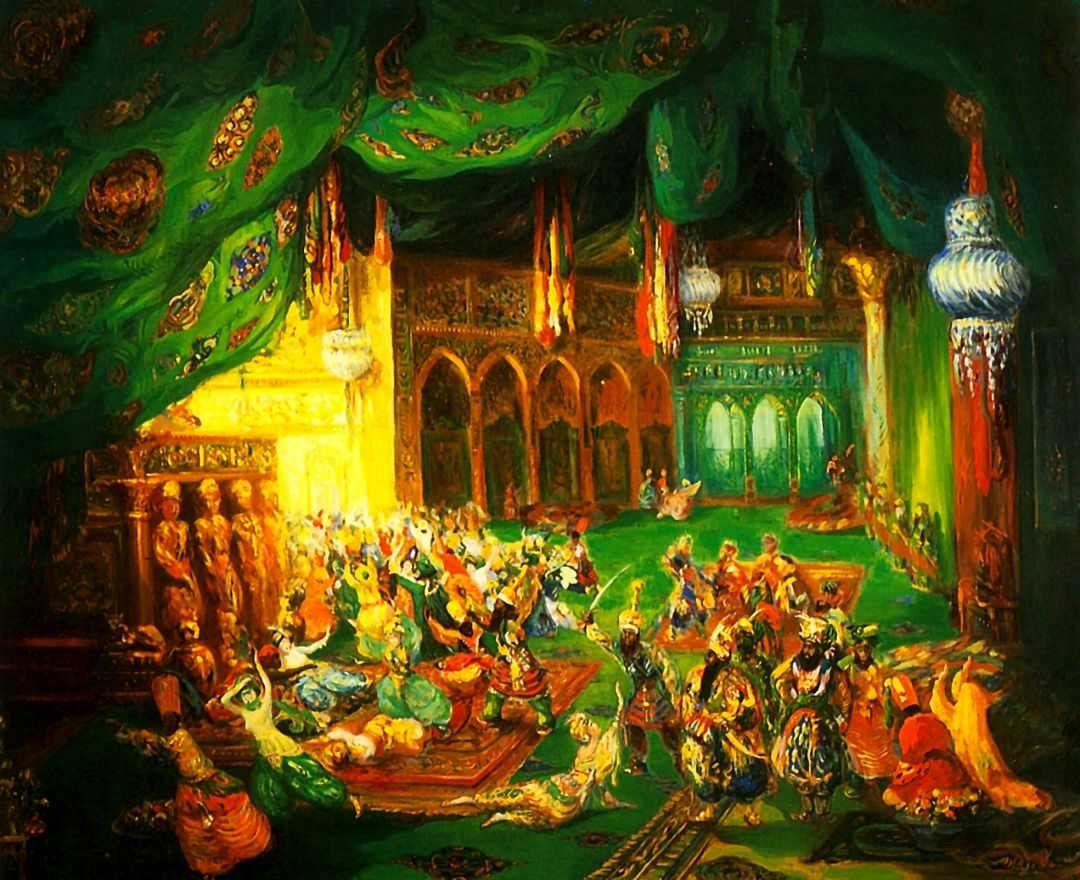
- Scheherazade by Léon Bakst (before 1917)
- Opus: 35
- Based on: One Thousand and One Nights
- Composed: 1888
- Movements: Four
- Scoring: Orchestra

Premiere
- Date: October 28, 1888

Scheherazade, also commonly Sheherazade (Russian: Шехеразада, romanized: Shekherazada, IPA: [ʂɨxʲɪrɐˈzadə]), Op. 35, is a symphonic suite composed by Nikolai Rimsky-Korsakov in 1888 and based on One Thousand and One Nights (also known as The Arabian Nights).

This orchestral work combines two features typical of Russian music in general and of Rimsky-Korsakov in particular: dazzling, colorful orchestration and an interest in the East, which figured greatly in the history of the Russian Empire, as well as Orientalism in general. The name "Scheherazade" refers to the main character Scheherazade of One Thousand and One Nights. It is one of Rimsky-Korsakov's most popular works.

== Background ==
During the winter of 1887, as he worked to complete Alexander Borodin's unfinished opera Prince Igor, Rimsky-Korsakov decided to compose an orchestral piece based on pictures from One Thousand and One Nights as well as separate and unconnected episodes. After formulating musical sketches of his proposed work, he moved with his family to the Glinki-Mavriny dacha, in Nyezhgovitsy along the Cherementets Lake (near present-day Luga, in Leningrad Oblast). The dacha where he stayed was destroyed by the Germans during World War II.

During the summer, he finished Scheherazade and the Russian Easter Festival Overture. Notes in his autograph orchestral score show that the former was completed between June 4 and August 7, 1888. Scheherazade consisted of a symphonic suite of four related movements that form a unified theme. It was written to produce a sensation of fantasy narratives from the Orient.

Initially, Rimsky-Korsakov intended to name the respective movements in Scheherazade "Prelude, Ballade, Adagio and Finale". However, after weighing the opinions of Anatoly Lyadov and others, as well as his own aversion to a too-definitive program, he settled upon thematic headings, based upon the tales from The Arabian Nights.

The composer deliberately made the titles vague so that they are not associated with specific tales or voyages of Sinbad. However, in the epigraph to the finale, he does make reference to the adventure of Prince Ajib. In a later edition, Rimsky-Korsakov did away with titles altogether, desiring instead that the listener should hear his work only as an Oriental-themed symphonic music that evokes a sense of the fairy-tale adventure, stating:

All I desired was that the hearer, if he liked my piece as symphonic music, should carry away the impression that it is beyond a doubt an Oriental narrative of some numerous and varied fairy-tale wonders and not merely four pieces played one after the other and composed on the basis of themes common to all the four movements.

He went on to say that he kept the name Scheherazade because it brought to everyone’s mind the fairy-tale wonders of Arabian Nights and the East in general.

== Music ==
I. The Sea and Sinbad's Ship

II. The Story of the Kalendar Prince

III. The Young Prince and the Young Princess

IV. Festival at Baghdad. The Sea. The Ship Breaks against a Cliff Surmounted by a Bronze Horseman
Performed by the San Francisco Symphony conducted by Pierre Monteux, with violin solo by Naoum Blinder

Rimsky-Korsakov wrote a brief introduction that he intended for use with the score as well as the program for the premiere:

The Sultan Schakhriar, convinced that all women are false and faithless, vowed to put to death each of his wives after the first nuptial night. But the Sultana Scheherazade saved her life by entertaining her lord with fascinating tales, told seriatim, for a thousand and one nights. The Sultan, consumed with curiosity, postponed from day to day the execution of his wife, and finally repudiated his bloody vow entirely.

The grim bass motif that opens the first movement represents the domineering Sultan.

The Sultan's Theme

This theme emphasizes four notes of a descending whole tone scale: E–D–C–B♭ (each note is a down beat, i.e. first note in each measure, with A♯ for B♭). After a few chords in the woodwinds, reminiscent of the opening of Mendelssohn's A Midsummer Night's Dream overture, the audience hears the leitmotif that represents the character of the storyteller herself, Scheherazade. This theme is a tender, sensuous, winding melody for violin solo, accompanied by harp.

Scheherazade's Theme

Rimsky-Korsakov stated:

The unison phrase, as though depicting Scheherazade’s stern spouse, at the beginning of the suite appears as a datum, in the Kalendar’s Narrative, where there cannot, however, be any mention of Sultan Shakhriar. In this manner, developing quite freely the musical data taken as a basis of composition, I had to view the creation of an orchestral suite in four movements, closely knit by the community of its themes and motives, yet presenting, as it were, a kaleidoscope of fairy-tale images and designs of Oriental character.

Rimsky-Korsakov had a tendency to juxtapose keys a major third apart, which can be seen in the strong relationship between E and C major in the first movement. This, along with his distinctive orchestration of melodies which are easily comprehensible, assembled rhythms, and talent for soloistic writing, allowed for such a piece as Scheherazade to be written.

The movements are unified by the short introductions in the first, second and fourth movements, as well as an intermezzo in the third. The last is a violin solo representing Scheherazade, and a similar artistic theme is represented in the conclusion of the fourth movement. The peaceful coda at the end of the final movement is representative of Scheherazade finally winning over the heart of the Sultan, allowing her to at last gain a peaceful night's sleep.

The music premiered in Saint Petersburg on October 28, 1888, conducted by Rimsky-Korsakov.

The reasons for its popularity are clear enough; it is a score replete with beguiling orchestral colors, fresh and piquant melodies, a mild oriental flavor, a rhythmic vitality largely absent from many major orchestral works of the later 19th century, and a directness of expression unhampered by quasi-symphonic complexities of texture and structure.

== Instrumentation ==
The work is scored for an orchestra consisting of:

Woodwinds
2 flutes and piccolo (2nd flute doubling 2nd piccolo for a few bars)
2 oboes (2nd doubling cor anglais)
2 clarinets in A and B♭
2 bassoons

Brass
4 horns in F
2 trumpets in A and B♭
3 trombones
1 tuba

Percussion
Timpani
Bass drum
Snare drum
Cymbals
Triangle
Tambourine
Tam-tam

Strings
Harp
Violins
Violas
Cellos
Basses

== Movements ==
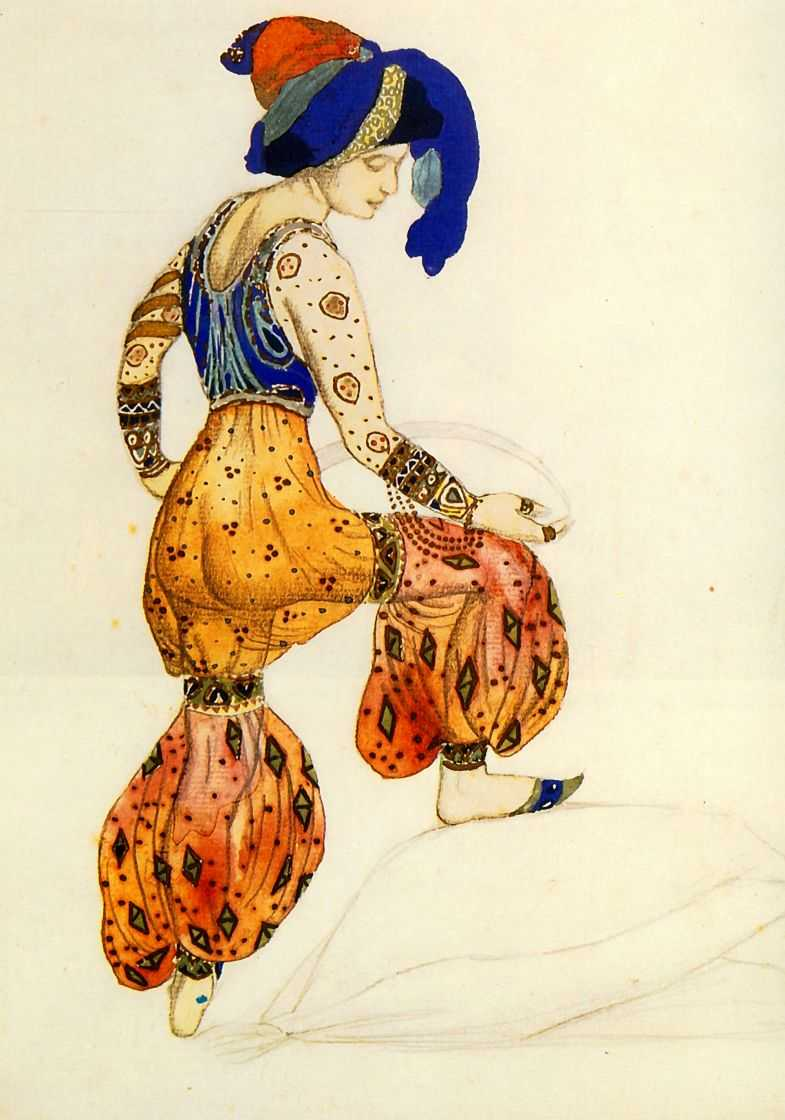
The Blue Sultana by Léon Bakst

The suite consists of four movements:

1. The Sea and Sinbad's Ship
2. The Story of the Kalendar Prince
3. The Young Prince and the Young Princess
4. Festival at Baghdad. The Sea. The Ship Breaks against a Cliff Surmounted by a Bronze Horseman

=== I. The Sea and Sinbad's Ship ===
Largo e maestoso – Lento – Allegro non troppo – Tranquillo (E minor – E major)

This movement is made up of various melodies and contains a general A B C A′ B C′ form. Although each section is highly distinctive, aspects of melodic figures carry through and unite them into a movement. Although similar in form to the classical symphony, the movement is more similar to the variety of motives used in one of Rimsky-Korsakov's previous works, Antar. Antar, however, used genuine Arab melodies as opposed to Rimsky-Korsakov’s own ideas of an oriental flavor.

Largo e maestoso

Lento

=== II. The Story of the Kalendar Prince ===
Lento – Andantino – Allegro molto – Vivace scherzando – Moderato assai – Allegro molto ed animato (B minor)

This movement follows a type of ternary theme and variation. The variations only change by virtue of the accompaniment, highlighting the piece's "Rimsky-ness" in the sense of simple musical lines allowing for greater appreciation of the orchestral clarity and brightness. Inside the general melodic line, a fast section highlights changes of tonality and structure.

Andantino

=== III. The Young Prince and the Young Princess ===
Andantino quasi allegretto – Pochissimo più mosso – Come prima – Pochissimo più animato (G major)

This movement is also ternary and is considered the simplest movement in form and melodic content. The inner section is said to be based on the theme from Tamara, while the outer sections have song-like melodic content. The outer themes are related to the inner by tempo and common motif, and the whole movement is finished by a quick coda return to the inner motif, balancing it out nicely.

Andantino quasi allegretto

=== IV. Festival at Baghdad. The Sea. The Ship Breaks against a Cliff Surmounted by a Bronze Horseman ===
Allegro molto – Lento – Vivo – Allegro non troppo e maestoso – Tempo come I (E minor – E major)

This movement ties in aspects of all the preceding movements as well as adding some new ideas, including an introduction of both the beginning of the movement and the Vivace section based on Sultan Shakhriar’s theme, a repeat of the main Scheherazade violin theme, and a reiteration of the fanfare motif to portray the ship wreck. Coherence is maintained by the ordered repetition of melodies, and continues the impression of a symphonic suite, rather than separate movements. A final conflicting relationship of the subdominant minor Shakhriar theme to the tonic major cadence of the Scheherazade theme resolves in a fantastic, lyrical, and finally peaceful conclusion.

Allegro molto

Andantino, molto frenetico

== Adaptations ==
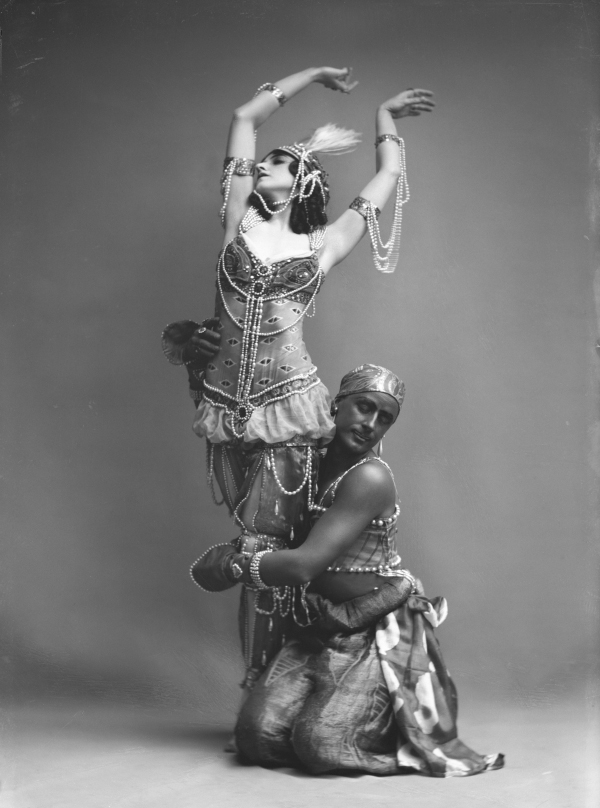
Mikhail Fokine and Vera Fokina in the Ballets Russes production of Scheherazade

=== Ballet ===
The original ballet adaptation of Scheherazade premiered on June 4, 1910, at the Opéra Garnier in Paris by the Ballets Russes. The choreography for the ballet was by Michel Fokine and the libretto was from Fokine and Léon Bakst. The Ballets Russes' Scheherazade is known for its traditionally dazzling costumes, opulent scenery, and erotic choreography and narrative which was rarely seen in ballets of the time.

At the time of its original creation, Paris was in the final years of the Belle-Époque period. Translated, “Belle-Époque” means “beautiful era”, and was a period of industry and optimism in which “the pursuit of pleasure supposedly eclipsed social, economic, and political concerns.” Orientalism was at the height of its vogue in Europe and Ballets Russes sought to bring the East (or the Westernized stereotype) to the West so audiences could live out their exotic fantasies without fear of social consequences. This ballet provoked exoticism by showing a masculine Golden Slave, danced by Vaslav Nijinsky, seducing Zobeide, danced by Ida Rubinstein, who is one of the many wives of the Shah. Nijinsky was painted gold and is said to have represented a phallus and eroticism is highly present in the orgiastic scenes played out in the background. Controversially, this was one of the first instances of a stage full of people simulating sexual activity. Nijinsky was short and androgynous but his dancing was powerful and theatrical. Scheherazade flipped conventions of classical ballet through the redirection of audiences’ focus from the grace and beauty of female bodies to male prowess and sensuality. As opposed to classical ballets of the time, the choreography of Scheherazade included more sensuous movements including body waves, and closer contact. The Golden Slave also incorporated more rippling and slower, sultry movement as opposed to the large, jump and turn heavy male solos audiences were used to seeing in classical ballets.

When the Shah returns and finds his wife in the Golden Slave's embrace, he sentences to death all of his cheating wives and their respective lovers. It is rumored that in this death scene, Nijinsky spun on his head. The ballet is not centered around codified classical ballet technique but rather around sensuous movement in the upper body and the arms. Exotic gestures are used as well as erotic back bends that expose the ribs and highlight the chest. Theatrics and mime play a huge role in the story telling.

Scheherazade came after Petipa's Swan Lake and The Sleeping Beauty, which were ballets strongly focused on classical ballet and technique. Fokine embraced the idea of diminished technique and further explored this after Scheherazade when he created Petrouchka in 1912. He went on to inspire other choreographers to throw away technique and embrace authenticity in movement.

Bakst, who designed the sets and costumes for Scheherazade, viewed the stage as a three-dimensional landscape in which dancers, sets, and costumes were all of equal importance. He had a big influence on interior design and fashion of that time by using unorthodox color schemes and exotic costuming for the ballet. In his costuming for Scheherazade, he focused on highlighting the movements of the body through his ornate, “histrionic” costumes.

The ballet’s performance and reception in Paris is said to have changed the course of ballet. The Ballets Russes premiered in Paris as the conservative theatres of Russia would not support or approve of the portrayal of such risqué ideas, but in Paris it was a hit. Like many of the Ballets Russes’ ballets, Scheherazade drew in audiences from far and wide. Its costume and scenic designs even inspired and influenced fashions in years to come.

Rimsky-Korsakov's widow protested against what she saw as the disarrangement of her husband's music in this choreographic drama.

=== Contemporary ballet adaptations ===
==== Alonzo King – LINES Ballet (2009) ====
Alonzo King’s reimagining of Scheherazade was commissioned in 2009 for the Monaco Dance Forum Festival’s centennial celebration of the Ballets Russes. King collaborated with composer Zakir Hussain for the score which incorporates traditional Eastern instruments with melodies of Rimsky-Korsakov’s original symphonic suite.

Contrary to the narrative of the original ballet, in which Scheherazade is just the narrator of the story of Shahryar and Zobeide, Alonzo brings the character of Scheherazade to the forefront of the ballet. She, rather than Zobeide, becomes the principal female character. However, King abstracts the narrative in such a way that his “choreographic focus was not on the details of the Arabian Nights narrative, but the symbolic meaning of Scheherazade.” In King’s version, Shahryar and Zobeide’s doomed marriage and the instigator of the thousand and one nights, as narrated by Scheherazade, is no longer the focal plotline. Rather, King focuses on Shahryar’s final relationship with Scheherazade herself and the development of his love for her through her storytelling.

King is known for his boundary pushing, long-lined, dynamic movement aesthetic which is exemplified in Scheherazade. In many of his works, King also seeks to “represent global cultures through dance by collaborative ventures with non-Western movement forms.” Scheherazade is no different, as exemplified by the very grounded movement, reminiscent of that of some Middle Eastern dance styles, that juxtaposes his typical aesthetic within the ballet. In moments throughout the ballet, non-Western forms can be seen through the rhythm of the movement, as well as the quick level changes from grounded to upright. Especially in ensemble sections with precise hand and footwork.

Robert Rosenwasser was the set and costume designer for King’s adaptation. His scenery is simplified from the original ballet’s. For this version, billowing fabrics overhead and a textured backdrop are suited to evoke mood changes as the lighting shifts. Rosenwasser’s ethereal over head lights shift with the dancers from overhead teardrops, to puddles of sand and back as the dance progresses. His costumes continue with the simplified, abstraction of the narrative. They are less reminiscent of the ornate, exotic harems the original ballet portrays and are instead gauzier and lightweight.

Overall, reception for King’s Scheherazade has been positive. SFGate proclaimed, “King has created nothing finer in years."

==== Jean-Christophe Maillot – Les Ballets de Monte Carlo (2009) ====
Artistic Director of Les Ballets de Monte Carlo, Jean-Christophe Maillot, reinterpreted Fokine’s Scheherazade in 2009; the same year Alonzo King premiered his work. Maillot’s adaptation premiered at the Grimaldi Forum Monaco.

Maillot pulled much inspiration from the original staging and choreography of Fokine’s ballet as it was set on the Ballets Russes. His biggest inspiration was the music itself: Rimsky-Korsakov’s symphonic suite of the same name.

His choreography honors that of the original ballet in its sensuous waves and ripples, as well as its narrative. However, it is also modernized with contemporary, almost jazz-influenced, movements for both male and female characters.

The sets and costumes were designed by Jerome Kaplan. They incorporate some elements directly from the original designs of Leon Bakst, but also strip some away. Both mix ornate and more streamlined designs depending on the characters and settings for the scenes. Maillot combines traditional and modern aesthetics to create a “spectacle” that transcends time. Where in the original ballet, most of the costuming was ornate no matter the character, Kaplan distinguishes between the characters of more importance through brighter color palettes and more intricate designs while the costumes for the corps are simplified.

Critical reviews of the work can be difficult to find. However, in a review of Maillot’s reimagining, Dance Magazine stated, “the results are hot and spicy.”

=== Others ===
Sergei Prokofiev wrote a Fantasia on Scheherazade for piano (1926), which he recorded on piano roll.

Song of Scheherazade is a 1947 Universal Picture in which the lead actress, Yvonne De Carlo, was also the principal dancer. The plot of this film is a heavily fictionalized story, based on the composer's early career in the navy. He was played by Jean-Pierre Aumont.

The film Invitation to the Dance by Gene Kelly uses Scheherazade as dance music in the third story of the film, the animated segment "Sinbad the Sailor".

Fritz Kreisler arranged the second movement (The Story of the Kalendar Prince) and the third movement (The Young Prince and the Princess) for violin and piano, giving the arrangements the names "Danse Orientale" and "Chanson Arabe", respectively.

In 1959, bandleader Skip Martin adapted from Scheherazade the jazz album Scheherajazz (Sommerset-Records),

Scheherazade is a popular music choice for competitive figure skating. Various cuts, mainly from the first movement, were widely used by skaters, including:

- Midori Ito during the 1989–90 season
- Michelle Kwan during the 2001–02 season for her free skate, where she won the bronze medal at the 2002 Winter Olympics in Salt Lake City, USA and silver at the 2002 World Figure Skating Championships in Nagano, Japan.
- Yuna Kim during the 2008–09 season, where she won gold at the 2009 World Figure Skating Championships in Los Angeles, USA.
- Evan Lysacek during the 2009-10 season for his free skate, where he won the gold medal at 2010 Winter Olympics in Vancouver.
- Mao Asada during the 2011–12 season
- Carolina Kostner during the 2013–14 season
- Meryl Davis/Charlie White during the 2013-14 season for their free dance, where they won the gold medal at 2014 Winter Olympics.
- Wakaba Higuchi during the 2016–17 season

== Recordings ==
- Serge de Diaghileff's Russian Ballet Orchestra, conducted by Ernest Ansermet (Columbia Recording, 1916).
- Philadelphia Orchestra, conducted by Leopold Stokowski (Victor Recording, 1927; re-released Biddulph, 1993).
- Philadelphia Orchestra, conducted by Leopold Stokowski (Victor Recording, 1934; re-released Cala, 1997).
- San Francisco Symphony, conducted by Pierre Monteux (Victor, recorded March 1942).
- Paris Conservatoire Orchestra, conducted by Ernest Ansermet (Decca, recorded May 1948).
- London Philharmonia Orchestra, conducted by Leopold Stokowski (1951; re-released Testament, 2003).
- Czech Philharmonic Orchestra, conducted by Zdeněk Chalabala (Supraphon LP. 1955; re-released Supraphon CD 2012).
- Morton Gould and his Orchestra, (violin – Max Pollikoff) (Red Seal, 1956).
- London Symphony Orchestra, conducted by Pierre Monteux (Decca, recorded June 1957).
- Orchestra of the Vienna State Opera, conducted by Mario Rossi, Vanguard Recording Society, 1957 .
- Concertgebouw Orchestra, conducted by Eduard van Beinum (Decca, 1957)
- Royal Philharmonic Orchestra, conducted by Sir Thomas Beecham (EMI, 1957).
- Orchestre de la Suisse Romande, conducted by Ernest Ansermet (Decca, 1958).
- Minneapolis Symphony Orchestra, conducted by Antal Doráti (Mercury Living Presence, 1959).
- New York Philharmonic, conducted by Leonard Bernstein (Columbia Masterworks, 1959; later released on CBS Masterworks, 1987).
- Philharmonia Orchestra, conducted by Paul Kletzki (violin – Hugh Bean) (EMI, 1960; later released on Classics for Pleasure, 1980).
- Chicago Symphony Orchestra, conducted by Fritz Reiner (RCA Victor Red Seal, 1960).
- Philadelphia Orchestra, conducted by Leopold Stokowski (1962 (live recording), Guild GHCD 2403, distr. by Albany).
- Philadelphia Orchestra, conducted by Eugene Ormandy (Columbia Masterworks, 1962; later released on Sony Masterworks).
- Concertgebouw Orchestra, conducted by Igor Markevitch (Phillips, 1964)
- London Symphony Orchestra, conducted by Leopold Stokowski (violin – Erich Gruenberg) (1964. Re-released on Cala, 2003).
- Bournemouth Symphony Orchestra, conducted by Constantin Silvestri (violin – Gerald Jarvis) (EMI 1967; re-released Disky CD 2001).
- Berlin Philharmonic, conducted by Herbert von Karajan (Deutsche Grammophon, 1967).
- USSR Symphony Orchestra conducted by Yevgeny Svetlanov (Columbia Masterworks Records, 1969; Melodiya LP, 1980; re-released Melodiya CD, 1996).
- London Philharmonic Orchestra, conducted by Bernard Haitink (Decca, 1974)
- Royal Philharmonic Orchestra, conducted by Leopold Stokowski (RCA Red Seal LP and CD, 1975).
- Moscow Philharmonic Orchestra, conducted by Konstantin Ivanov (violin – Yoko Sato) (live broadcast recording from Radio Petersburg, 1978).
- Concertgebouw Orchestra, conducted by Kirill Kondrashin (Philips, 1979).
- London Symphony Orchestra, conducted by Loris Tjeknavorian (recorded 1979, released on LP Chalfont Records 1980; released on CD Varese Sarabande 1984)
- Moscow Radio Symphony Orchestra, conducted by Vladimir Fedoseyev (recorded at Moscow Radio Large Hall, Victor 1981; re-released Victor, CD 1995).
- Montreal Symphony Orchestra, conducted by Charles Dutoit (Decca, 1983).
- Munich Philharmonic Orchestra, conducted by Sergiu Celibidache (EMI Classics, LP 1984, CD 2004).
- Berlin Philharmonic Orchestra, conducted by Lorin Maazel (Polydor, 1986).
- Czech Philharmonic Orchestra, conducted by Alexander Rahbari (violin – Josef Suk) (Supraphon Records CD 11 0391-2, 1989).
- London Symphony Orchestra, conducted by Sir Charles Mackerras (Telarc, 1990).
- Philadelphia Orchestra, conducted by Riccardo Muti (Angel Records, 1990).
- London Philharmonic, conducted by Andrew Litton (EMI, 1990).
- New York Philharmonic, conducted by Yuri Temirkanov, (violin – Glenn Dicterow) (RCA CD 1991).
- Orchestra of the Opéra Bastille, conducted by Myung-whun Chung (Deutsche Grammophon, 1993).
- Concertgebouw Orchestra, conducted by Riccardo Chailly (Decca, 1994)
- Vienna Philharmonic Orchestra, conducted by Seiji Ozawa (PolyGram, 1994).
- London Philharmonic, conducted by Mariss Jansons (EMI, 1995).
- Atlanta Symphony Orchestra, conducted by Robert Spano (Telarc, 2001).
- Kirov Orchestra, conducted by Valery Gergiev (Philips, 2002).
- Israel Philharmonic Orchestra, conducted by Zubin Mehta (Sony Music Entertainment, 2007).
- Toronto Symphony Orchestra, conducted by Peter Oundjian (Chandos, 2014).
- Orquesta Sinfónica de Galicia, conducted by Leif Segerstam (RDC Producciones/CRTVG, 2015)

== See also ==
- List of compositions by Nikolai Rimsky-Korsakov
