= Antar (Rimsky-Korsakov) =

Symphonic suite by Nikolai Rimsky-Korsakov

- (formerly: Symphony No. 2)
- Symphonic suite by Nikolai Rimsky-Korsakov
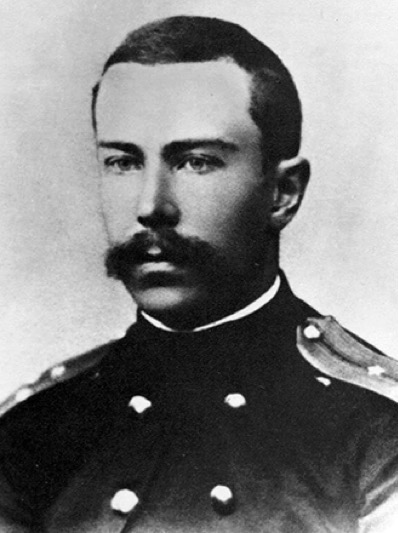
- Rimsky-Korsakov photographed in 1866
- Opus: 9
- Composed: 1868, revised 1875 and 1891
- Performed: 1869
- Movements: four
- Scoring: orchestra

Antar is a composition for symphony orchestra in four movements by the Russian composer Nikolai Rimsky-Korsakov. He wrote the piece in 1868 but revised it in 1875 and 1891. He initially called the work his Symphony No. 2. He later reconsidered and called it a symphonic suite. It was first performed in March 1869 at a concert of the Russian Musical Society.

== Form ==
The suite is in four movements:

1. Largo—Allegro giocoso
2. Allegro—Molto allegro—Allargando
3. Allegro risoluto alla marcia
4. Allegretto vivace—Andante amoroso

== Instrumentation ==
Antar is scored for an orchestra consisting of 3 flutes (3rd doubling on piccolo), 2 oboes (2nd doubling cor anglais), 2 clarinets in A and B♭, 2 bassoons, 4 horns in F, 2 trumpets in A and B♭, 3 trombones, 2 tubas, timpani, bass drum, cymbals, tambourine, tam-tam, triangle, snare drum, 2 harps, and strings.

== Overview ==
=== Legend ===
This work was inspired by an Arabian tale by Sennkovsky, suggested to Rimsky-Korsakov by Modest Mussorgsky and César Cui. Antar, an enemy of all mankind, has become a recluse in the desert. He saves a gazelle from a large bird. Weary from fighting the bird, he falls asleep exhausted. He dreams he is in the palace of the Queen of Palmyra. The queen, the fairy Gul-Nazar, was the gazelle Antar saved from the bird. As a reward, she permits Antar to fulfill three of life's greatest joys — vengeance, power and love. He accepts these gifts with gratitude, then makes a request himself. He asks the queen to take his life if these pleasures become tiresome. He then falls in love with the queen. After some time, however, he becomes weary of his passion. The queen takes him in her arms, kissing him with such ferocity that his life ebbs away.

This legend as a whole is incorporated in the opening movement; the other three depict each of the three joys. As Hector Berlioz did in his Symphonie fantastique, Rimsky-Korsakov employs an idée fixe or motto theme in various guises through all four movements to depict Antar. This theme is played by the violas in the introduction to the opening movement. Later in the same movement, flutes and horns play another important theme, this time depicting the queen.

=== Composition history ===
When initially sketching Antar, Rimsky-Korsakov called it his Second Symphony, allowing it to be published as such. When he revised the work years later, he renamed it a symphonic suite. Adding to the confusion was his calling his C major Symphony his Third instead of his Second. Granted, he wrote the Third Symphony in 1874, before he may have changed his mind about Antar. (The first revision of Antar was in 1875.) However, he never changed this numbering even after redesignating Antar a suite, and he continued calling the C major Symphony his Third in his autobiography, My Musical Life.

In fact Rimsky-Korsakov designated another work his Second Symphony in My Musical Life. This is a Symphony in B minor, which he started in 1867. He mentions B minor as a favorite key of Mily Balakirev's, and that he wanted to use a scherzo in 5/4 time and in the key of E♭ major. He adds that the opening of the first movement and some of its characteristics would have resembled Beethoven's Ninth Symphony.

He showed his work-in-progress to Balakirev. Balakirev did not approve of how Rimsky-Korsakov had written the exposition of his themes but did not give concrete suggestions or solutions on how to proceed. As a result, Rimsky-Korsakov lost interest in the project: "I repeat I was disappointed in my musical offspring and soon abandoned or postponed indefinitely the idea of writing a second symphony." He started Antar after abandoning the B minor Symphony, finishing the first and fourth movements that winter.

Rimsky-Korsakov explained both the change of Antar from symphony to suite and his adamant stance on doing so:

The term Suite was then unfamiliar [in 1868] to our circle in general, nor was it in vogue in the musical literature of western Europe. Still, I was wrong in calling Antar a symphony. My Antar was a poem, suite, fairy-tale, story, or anything you like, but not a symphony. Its structure in four separate movements was all that made it approach a symphony.

Elaborating on this point, he cites Berlioz's Harold en Italie and Symphonie fantastique as being symphonies as well as program music, due to the symphonic development of their themes and sonata form of their opening movements. Antar, in contrast, "is a free musical delineation of the consecutive episodes of the story." While the "Antar" theme links these episodes, the piece "has no thematic development whatsoever—only variations and paraphrases." (Note: The composer gives a more detailed analysis of Antar in My Musical Life.) The composer was happy with Antar's form when he revised the score years later.

He was also pleased overall with the orchestration of Antar, which he described as being "full of colour and fancy", mentioning especially his use of flutes, clarinets and harp in their lower registers. He scored the initial appearance of the "Antar" theme to violas to please Mussorgsky since he was especially fond of the instrument. He mentions several works whose influence made themselves felt in scoring Antar. These include Ruslan and Lyudmila, Liszt's symphonic poems, Balakirev's Czech Overture and Wagner's Faust Overture.

=== Versions ===
Because of Rimsky-Korsakov's continued revisions on Antar and difficulty with the publisher Bessel, textual complications are both rife and hopelessly confusing. Adding to the confusion are misstatements on two of the published scores. There are actually four published versions of Antar:

- The first version of the score in 1868.
  This version was not printed in the composer's lifetime; it was published in 1949. This edition also contains the earliest version of the second movement, very different in material and in the key of B minor. This movement was removed and another substituted before the first performance.
- A revised and reorchestrated version in 1875.
  Still called a symphony by Rimsky-Korsakov, this version was published by Bessel in 1880. It is considered by some more dramatically focused than the 1897 version.
- A second revised version in 1897.
  This is thought to be marginally the most cogent version, containing the composer's final thoughts on this work. Here Rimsky-Korsakov changed the work's designation to "symphonic suite". Bessel did not publish this version until 1913, under the supervision of the composer's son-in-law Maximilian Steinberg. Confusingly, this version is marked "Passed by censor. Spb.4 November 1903." This date actually belongs to the 1903 version.
- A 1903 re-working of the 1875 version.
  This is a compromise version made after Bessel refused during the composer's lifetime to scrap the engraving plates from the 1875 version or to make new ones for the 1897 version. It includes only what "suggestions" from the 1897 version could be incorporated onto the existing 1875 plates. This version was confusingly labeled "symphonic suite (Second Symphony)." It was also falsely described on Eulenberg and Breitkopf miniature scores as "Nouvelle rédaction (1897)."

We are left with three main versions of Antar; the second exists in two slightly different forms. Minor changes between the three main versions (1868, 1875 and 1897) include tempo markings, dynamic nuances and modifications of scoring. Major changes include cuts and insertion of passages, wholesale transposition and complete recomposition of passages, along with reorchestration and amended harmony or melody.

== Influences ==
=== Berlioz ===
Hector Berlioz paid his final visit to Russia between November 1867 and February 1868 to conduct six concerts of the Russian Musical Society. Rimsky-Korsakov was not able to meet Berlioz due to the French composer's ill health. He was, however, able to hear Berlioz conduct his Symphonie fantastique on December 7, 1867, and Harold en Italie at Berlioz's final concert on February 8, 1868. Rimsky-Korsakov began work on Antar on January 21, between these two concerts. Further, he may have been influenced in using the Antar theme as an idée fixe by the way he heard Berlioz use it in his compositions.

=== Dargomyzhsky and the Five ===
As was their practice at that time, other members of the nationalists' circle readily helped Rimsky-Korsakov in composing Antar. Their music helped to influence him, as well. Rimsky-Korsakov wrote that he was influenced when he composed the Antar theme by themes from César Cui's opera William Ratcliff. He borrowed Gül Nazar's theme, as well as the other purely cantabile themes, from Salvador Daniel's Collection of Algerian melodies, a copy of which Alexander Borodin happened to possess.

Rimsky-Korsakov mentioned receiving the principal theme of the fourth movement from Alexander Dargomyzhsky; Dargomyzhsky, in turn, had taken it from Khristianovich's collection of Arab melodies. While Rimsky-Korsakov also claimed that Dargomyzhsky also supplied the opening theme of the Adagio and that he retained Dargomyzhsky's original harmonization of this theme, he is being overly modest. The autograph copy of this melody with Dargomyzhsky's harmonization is preserved in the Houghton Library of Harvard University. It shows that Rimsky not only did not use Dargomyzhsky's harmonization but altered the melody as well.

One member of "The Five" conspicuously absent was Mily Balakirev. Rimsky-Korsakov wanted independence from Balakirev's influence, which he now found despotic and burdensome. Antar marked a cooling-off of their relationship. Balakirev's lack of enthusiasm with Antar's progress probably did not help. While the completed first and fourth movements won praise from the rest of "The Five", Balakirev "approved them with reservations."

=== Orientalism ===
In both program and musical treatment, Antar is dominated by the theme of orientalism. This practice is not confined to using authentic Eastern melodies. More importantly, it is the musical conventions added to the oriental material—whether the music represents intoxication, sensuality, sexual longing or other themes. In this way, orientalism served as a safety valve for subjects otherwise not considered mentionable in society. It was also a way of expressing Western feelings of superiority in nations actively engaged in imperialism. These nations included Russia as it expanded eastward under Alexander II.

In telling the story of Antar, which is set in the East (Arabia), Rimsky-Korsakov highlights two different styles of music, Western (Russian) and Eastern (Arabian). The first theme, Antar's, is masculine and Russian in character. The second theme, feminine and oriental in melodic contour, belongs to the queen, Gul Nazar.

In Antar, Rimsky-Korsakov was able to soften this theme to some extent. He does not allow either the story or its musical depiction to become overtly misogynistic, as Balakirev later would with his symphonic poem Tamara. He does not pit his two themes in a major struggle for dominance. However, female sensuality does exert a paralyzing, ultimately destructive influence. With Gul Nazar extinguishing Antar's life in a final embrace, the woman overcomes the man.

== Performances ==
=== Concerts ===
Though now eclipsed by Scheherazade in popularity, Antar was performed fairly frequently during the composer's lifetime, several times under his direction. One person who would not conduct it was Eduard Nápravník. Asked more than once to do so, he finally replied, with apparent disdain, "[Rimsky-Korsakov] might as well conduct it himself." The composer did exactly that, at an 1876 concert of the Russian Musical Society (RMS).

Hans von Bülow also tried to remove himself from performing Antar, though this may have been due more to the conductor's famous irascibility than to the piece itself. When Bülow guest-conducted for the RMS in 1886, Rimsky-Korsakov wrote that Bülow "was in a capricious mood at the rehearsal, testy with the orchestra, even suggesting irritably to me that I conduct it in his stead. Of course I declined. Presently Bülow calmed down and led Antar in excellent fashion."

In addition, there is the question of versions—namely, which edition of Antar is being performed. Until quite recently, conductors usually favored the 1903 re-working. The problem is that it does not reflect the composer's final thoughts on the piece. These amendments include changing the key of the second movement from C♯ minor to D minor plus several other refinements.

=== Recordings ===
Most recordings of Antar, including those of Neeme Järvi, Dmitri Kitayenko, David Zinman, Pierre Monteux, Lorin Maazel, and Ernest Ansermet, use the 1903 version even though sleeve notes on their recordings credit the edition as the 1897 version.

Yevgeny Svetlanov, Sir Thomas Beecham, Konstantin Ivanov, Kees Bakels and Jiří Bělohlávek have all recorded the real 1897 version. Svetlanov recorded the 1897 edition on three occasions, first in 1978 with the USSR Symphony Orchestra for Melodiya (arguably the best known recorded version), then with the same orchestra (renamed State Symphony Orchestra of Russia) for RCA and in 1989 with The Philharmonia Orchestra for Hyperion Records.

Antar was the first piece of classical music recorded in stereo. It was performed by the Orchestre de la Suisse Romande under Ernest Ansermet and released by Decca Records in 1954.

== Arrangements ==
In 1869–70, Nadezhda Nikolayevna Purgold arranged the original version of Antar for piano four-hands. In 1875, four years after her marriage to Rimsky-Korsakov, she also arranged the second version of Antar for piano four-hands. This arrangement was published by Bessel.

== Sources ==
- Abraham, Gerald (1981). Sadie, Stanley (ed.). The New Grove Dictionary of Music and Musicians. London; Hong Kong: MacMillan Publishing Company. ISBN 0-333-23111-2.
- Abraham, Gerald (1968). Slavonic and Romantic Music: Essays and Studies. New York: St. Martin's Press. ISBN 978-0571084500. LCCN 68-13029.
- Ewen, David, ed. (1989). The Complete Book of Classical Music. London: Hale. ISBN 978-0-7090-3865-8.
- Krusek, Nicolas (2014). Rimsky-Korsakov's Antar Symphony: a biographical and analytical study (Master of Arts thesis). University of British Columbia. doi:10.14288/1.0166957. Archived from the original on 19 September 2024.
- Maes, Francis (2002). A History of Russian Music: From Kamarinskaya to Babi Yar. Translated by Pomerans, Arnold J.; Pomerans, Erica. Berkeley; London: University of California Press. ISBN 978-0520218154 – via Google Books.
- Rimsky-Korsakov, Nikolay (1923). Van Vechten, Carl (ed.). My Musical Life. Translated by Joffe, Judah A. (2nd, revised ed.). New York: A.A. Knopf – via IMSLP.
  - Rimsky-Korsakov, Nikolai (1928). Летопись моей музыкальной жизни [My Musical Life] (in Russian) (3rd ed.). Moscow: G.I.M.S. – via IMSLP.
- Wallace, Roy (2002). "Rimsky-Korsakov: Scheherazade, Antar; L'Orchestre de la Suisse Romande conducted by Ernest Ansermet". 470 253-2 (Liner notes). Interviewed by Roy Haddy. Decca.
