= The Five (composers) =

Five prominent 19th-century Russian composers

The Five (Russian: Могучая кучка, lit. 'Mighty Bunch'), also known as the Mighty Handful or The Mighty Five, were five prominent 19th-century Russian composers who worked together to create a distinct national style of classical music: Mily Balakirev (the leader), César Cui, Modest Mussorgsky, Nikolai Rimsky-Korsakov and Alexander Borodin. They lived in Saint Petersburg and collaborated from 1856 to 1870.

== History ==
=== Name ===
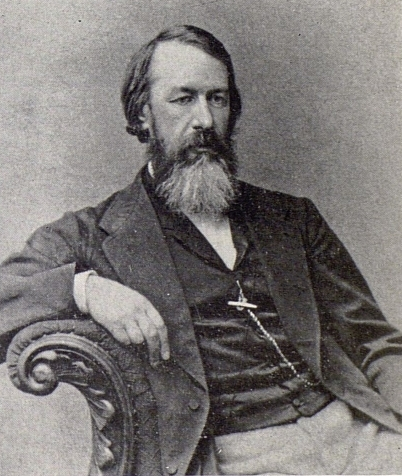
Vladimir Stasov (1824–1906)

In May 1867 the critic Vladimir Stasov wrote an article, titled Mr. Balakirev's Slavic Concert, covering a concert that had been performed for visiting Slav delegations at the "All-Russian Ethnographical Exhibition" in Moscow. The four Russian composers whose works were played at the concert were Mikhail Glinka, Alexander Dargomyzhsky, Mily Balakirev, and Nikolai Rimsky-Korsakov. The article ended with the following statement:

God grant that our Slav guests may never forget today's concert; God grant that they may forever preserve the memory of how much poetry, feeling, talent, and intelligence are possessed by the small handful of Russian musicians.

— Vladimir Stasov, Sankt-Peterburgskie Vedomosti, 1867

The expression "mighty handful" (Russian: Могучая кучка, Moguchaya kuchka, "Mighty Bunch") was mocked by enemies of Balakirev and Stasov: Aleksandr Serov, academic circles of the conservatory, the Russian Musical Society, and their press supporters. The group ignored critics and continued operating under the moniker. This loose collection of composers gathered around Balakirev now included Cui, Mussorgsky, Rimsky-Korsakov, and Borodin — the five who have come to be associated with the name "Mighty Handful", or sometimes "The Five". Gerald Abraham stated flatly in the Grove Dictionary of Music and Musicians that "they never called themselves, nor were they ever called in Russia, 'The Five'" (although today the Russian equivalent "Пятёрка" ("Pyatyorka") is occasionally used to refer to this group). In his memoirs, Rimsky-Korsakov routinely refers to the group as "Balakirev's circle", and occasionally uses "The Mighty Handful", usually with an ironic tone. He also makes the following reference to "The Five":

If we leave out of account Lodyzhensky, who accomplished nothing, and Lyadov, who appeared later, Balakirev's circle consisted of Balakirev, Cui, Mussorgsky, Borodin, and me (the French have retained the denomination of "Les Cinq" for us to this day).

— Nikolay Rimsky-Korsakov, Chronicle of My Musical Life, 1909

The Russian word kuchka also spawned the terms "kuchkism" and "kuchkist", which may be applied to artistic aims or works in tune with the sensibilities of the Mighty Handful.

=== Formation ===
The formation of the group began in 1856 with the first meeting of Balakirev and César Cui. Modest Mussorgsky joined them in 1857, Nikolai Rimsky-Korsakov in 1861, and Alexander Borodin in 1862. All the composers in The Five were young men in 1862. Balakirev was 25, Cui 27, Mussorgsky 23, Borodin the eldest at 28, and Rimsky-Korsakov just 18. They were all self-trained amateurs. Borodin combined composing with a career in chemistry. Cui was an army engineer who, starting in 1857 and throughout 1860s, taught fortification at military academies. Rimsky-Korsakov was a naval officer (he wrote his First Symphony on a three-year naval voyage circumnavigating the globe). Mussorgsky had been in the prestigious Preobrazhensky Regiment of the Imperial Guard, and then in the civil service before taking up music; even at the height of his career in the 1870s he was forced by the expense of his drinking habit to hold down a full-time job in the State Forestry Department.

In contrast to the élite status and court connections of Conservatory composers such as Pyotr Ilyich Tchaikovsky, The Five were mainly from the minor gentry of the provinces. To some degree their esprit de corps depended on the myth, which they themselves created, of a movement that was more "authentically Russian," in the sense that it was closer to the native soil, than the classic academy. Spurred on by Russian nationalist ideas, the Five "sought to capture elements of rural Russian life, to build national pride, and to prevent western ideals from seeping into their culture."

Before them, Mikhail Glinka and Alexander Dargomyzhsky had gone some way towards producing a distinctly Russian kind of music, writing operas on Russian subjects, but the Mighty Handful represented the first concentrated attempt to develop such a music, with Stasov as their artistic adviser and Dargomyzhsky as an elder statesman to the group, so to speak. The circle began to fall apart during the 1870s, no doubt partially due to the fact that Balakirev withdrew from musical life early in the decade for a period of time. All of "The Five" are buried in Tikhvin Cemetery in Saint Petersburg.

== Musical language ==
=== Stylization ===
The musical language The Five developed set them far apart from the Conservatoire. This self-conscious Russian styling was based on two elements:

- They tried to incorporate in their music what they heard in village songs, in Cossack and Caucasian dances, in church chants and the tolling of church bells (to the point where the bell tolling became a cliché). The Five's music became filled with imitative sounds of Russian life. They also tried to reproduce the long-drawn, lyrical and melismatic peasant song, what Glinka had once called "the soul of Russian music." Balakirev made this possible by his study of songs from the Volga in the 1860s. More than any previous anthology, his transcriptions artfully preserved the distinctive aspects of Russian folk music:
  - Tonal mutability
  A tune seems to shift naturally from one tonal center to another, often ending up in a different key than the one in which the song began. This can produce a feeling of elusiveness, a lack of definition or of logical progression in the harmony. Even when stylized by The Five, this quality can make Russian music sound very different from the tonal structures of the West.
  - Heterophony
  A melody is simultaneously rendered by two or more performers in different variations. This is improvised by the singers until the end, when the song reverts to a single melodic line.
  - Parallel fifths, fourths, and thirds
  The effect lends Russian music a raw sonority missing entirely from the comparatively polished harmonies of Western music.
- The Five also adopted a series of harmonic devices to create a distinct "Russian" style and color different from Western music. This "exotic" styling of "Russia" was not just self-conscious but entirely invented. None of these devices were actually used in Russian folk or church music:
  - Whole tone scale
  Although Glinka did not invent this scale, his application of it in the opera Ruslan and Lyudmila (1842) — most recognizable at the end of the festive overture — provided a characteristic harmonic and melodic device. This scale in "Russian" works often suggests evil or ominous personages or situations. It was used by all the major composers from Tchaikovsky (the appearance of the Countess's ghost in The Queen of Spades) to Rimsky-Korsakov (in all his magic-story operas—Sadko, Kashchey the Deathless and The Invisible City of Kitezh). Claude Debussy also uses this scale in his music, taking this, among many things, from the Russians. Later it became a standard device in horror-movie scores.
  - The Russian submediant
  Also linked to Glinka's Ruslan, this is a harmonic pattern (in major mode) in which one upper part proceeds from the dominant pitch chromatically to the submediant while the other harmony parts remain constant. The most basic form of this pattern can be shown as follows (beginning with typical tonic): root-position tonic triad → root-position augmented tonic triad → 1st inversion submediant minor triad. A famous example of the Russian submediant occurs in the very opening bars of the third movement of Rimsky-Korsakov's Scheherezade.
  - Diminished or octatonic scale
  Rimsky-Korsakov first used this in his symphonic poem Sadko in 1867. This scale became a sort of Russian calling-card — a leitmotif of magic and menace used not just by Rimsky-Korsakov but all of his followers, above all Alexander Scriabin, Maurice Ravel, Igor Stravinsky and Olivier Messiaen (mode 2).
  - Modular rotation in sequences of thirds
  The Five made this device of Franz Liszt their own to base a loose symphonic-poem type of structure. This way, they could avoid the rigid Western laws of modulation in sonata form, allowing the form of a musical composition to be shaped entirely by the "content" of the music (its programmatic statements and visual descriptions) rather than by formal laws of symmetry. This loose structure became especially important for Mussorgsky's Pictures at an Exhibition, a work that may have done more than any other to define the Russian style.
  - Pentatonic scale
  This stylistic aspect became used by every Russian nationalist composer. Its distinctive feature is to have only five notes in the octave, rather than the seven of the heptatonic scales (e.g., major and minor). The pentatonic scale is one of the ways of suggesting a "primitive" folk-melodic style as well as the "Eastern" element (Middle East, Asia). A melodic example of the "major-mode" pentatonic scale (C-D-E-G-A) can be heard at the entrance of the chorus at the beginning of Borodin's Prince Igor.

=== Orientalism ===
One hallmark of "The Five" was its reliance on orientalism. Many quintessentially "Russian" works were composed in orientalist style, such as Balakirev's Islamey, Borodin's Prince Igor and Rimsky-Korsakov's Scheherazade. Orientalism, in fact, became widely considered in the West both one of the best-known aspects of Russian music and a trait of Russian national character. As leader of "The Five," Balakirev encouraged the use of eastern themes and harmonies to set their "Russian" music apart from the German symphonism of Anton Rubinstein and other Western-oriented composers. Because Rimsky-Korsakov used Russian folk and oriental melodies in his First Symphony, Stasov and the other nationalists dubbed it the "First Russian Symphony," even though Rubinstein had written his Ocean Symphony a dozen years before it. These were themes Balakirev had transcribed in the Caucasus. "The symphony is good," Cui wrote to Rimsky-Korsakov in 1863, while the latter was out on naval deployment. "We played it a few days ago at Balakirev's—to the great pleasure of Stassov. It is really Russian. Only a Russian could have composed it, because it lacks the slightest trace of any stagnant Germanness."

Orientalism was not confined to using authentic Eastern melodies. What became more important than the melodies themselves were the musical conventions added to them. These conventions allowed orientalism to become an avenue for writing music on subjects considered unmentionable otherwise, such as political themes and erotic fantasies. It also became a means of expressing Russian supremacy as the empire expanded under Alexander II. Two major works entirely dominated by orientalism are Rimsky-Korsakov's symphonic suite Antar and Balakirev's symphonic poem Tamara. Antar, set in Arabia, uses two different styles of music, Western (Russian) and Eastern (Arabian). The first theme, Antar's, is masculine and Russian in character. The second theme, feminine and oriental in melodic contour, belongs to the queen, Gul Nazar. However, female sensuality does exert a paralyzing, ultimately destructive influence. With Gul Nazar extinguishing Antar's life in a final embrace, the woman overcomes the man.

Balakirev gives a more overtly misogynistic view of oriental women in Tamara. He had originally planned to write a Caucasan dance called a lezginka, modeled on Glinka, for this work. However, he discovered a poem by Mikhail Lermontov about the beautiful Tamara, who lived in a tower alongside the gorge of Daryal. She lured travelers and allowed them to enjoy a night of sensual delights, only to kill them and throw their bodies into the River Terek. Balakirev uses two specific codes endemic to orientalism in writing Tamara. The first code, based on obsessive rhythms, note repetitions, climactic effects and accelerated tempi, represents Dionysian intoxication. The second code, consisting of unpredictable rhythms, irregular phrasing and based on long passages with many repeat notes, augmented and diminished intervals and extended melismas, depict sensual longing. Not only did Balakirev use these codes extensively, but he also attempted to supercharge them further when he revised the orchestration of Tamara in 1898.

== Quotations ==
Rimsky-Korsakov provides the following picture of "The Mighty Handful" in his memoirs, Chronicle of My Musical Life (translated by J. A. Joffe):

=== Tastes ===
The tastes of the circle leaned towards Glinka, Schumann, and Beethoven's last quartets ... they had little respect for Mendelssohn ... Mozart and Haydn were considered out of date and naive ... J. S. Bach was held to be petrified ... Chopin was likened by Balakirev to a nervous society lady ... Berlioz was highly esteemed ...Liszt was comparatively unknown ... Little was said of Wagner ... They respected Dargomyzhsky for the recitative portions of Rusalka ... [but] he was not credited with any considerable talent and was treated with a shade of derision. ...Rubinstein had a reputation as a pianist, but was thought to have neither talent nor taste as a composer.

=== Balakirev ===
Balakirev, who had never had any systematic course in harmony and counterpoint and had not even superficially applied himself to them, evidently thought such studies quite unnecessary ... An excellent pianist, a superior sight reader of music, a splendid improviser, endowed by nature with the sense of correct harmony and part-writing, he possessed a technique partly native and partly acquired through a vast musical erudition, with the help of an extraordinary memory, keen and retentive, which means so much in steering a critical course in musical literature ... He instantly felt every technical imperfection or error, he grasped a defect in form at once. Whenever I or other young men, later on, played him our essays at composition, he instantly caught all the defects of form, modulation, and so on, and forthwith seating himself at the piano, he would improvise and show how the composition in question should be changed exactly as he indicated, and frequently entire passages in other people's compositions became his and not their putative authors' at all. He was obeyed absolutely, for the spell of his personality was tremendous. ... His influence over those around him was boundless, and resembled some magnetic or mesmeric force. ... he despotically demanded that the tastes of his pupils should exactly coincide with his own. The slightest deviation from his taste was severely censured by him. By means of raillery, a parody or caricature played by him, whatever did not suit him at the moment was belittled — and the pupil blushed with shame for his expressed opinion and recanted....

=== Abilities ===
Balakirev considered me a symphony specialist ... in the sixties, Balakirev and Cui, though very intimate with Mussorgsky and sincerely fond of him, treated him like a lesser light, and of little promise at that, in spite of his undoubted talent. It seemed to them that there was something missing in him and, in their eyes, he was in need of advice and criticism. Balakirev often said that Mussorgsky had 'no head' or that his 'brains were weak.' ... Balakirev thought that Cui understood little in symphony and musical forms and nothing in orchestration, but was a past master in vocal and operatic music; Cui, in turn, thought Balakirev a master in symphony, form, and orchestration, but with little liking for operatic composition and vocal music in general. Thus they complemented each other, but each, in his own way, felt mature and grown up. Borodin, Mussorgsky, and I, however — we were immature and juvenile. Obviously, towards Balakirev and Cui we were in somewhat subordinate relations; their opinions were listened to unconditionally....

== Influence ==
Except perhaps for Cui, the members of this group influenced or taught many of the great Russian composers who were to follow, including Alexander Glazunov, Mikhail Ippolitov-Ivanov, Sergei Prokofiev, Igor Stravinsky, and Dmitri Shostakovich. They also influenced the two French symbolist composers Maurice Ravel and Claude Debussy through their radical tonal language.

== See also ==
- Related Russian topics
  - List of Russian composers
  - Belyayev circle, successors to The Five
  - Tchaikovsky and the Five
- Groups of composers known by number
  - American Five
  - Group of Eight (music), Spanish composers
  - Les Six

== Sources ==
- Figes, Orlando (2002). Natasha's Dance: A Cultural History of Russia. New York: Metropolitan Books. ISBN 9780140297966.
- Maes, Francis (2002). A History of Russian Music: From 'Kamarinskaya' to 'Babi Yar'. Translated by Pomerans, Arnold J.; Pomerans, Erica. Berkeley, Los Angeles and London: University of California Press. ISBN 0520248252.
