= Symphony No. 1 (Rimsky-Korsakov) =

Symphony by Nikolai Rimsky-Korsakov

Symphony in E minor
- No. 1
- by Nikolai Rimsky-Korsakov
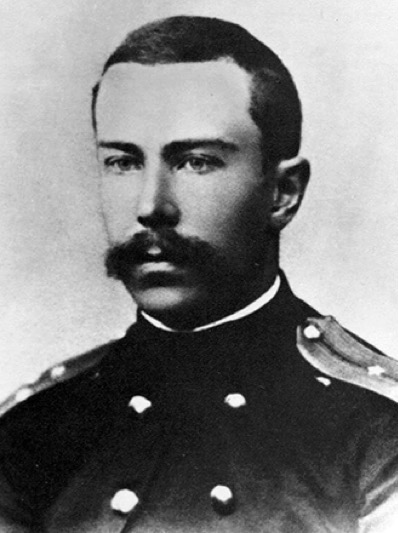
- The composer as a naval cadet, when he wrote his First Symphony
- Opus: 1
- Composed: 1861–65
- Performed: December 1865
- Movements: four

Nikolai Rimsky-Korsakov composed his Symphony No. 1 in E minor, Op. 1 (originally in E♭ minor), between 1861 and 1865 under the guidance of Mily Balakirev. Balakirev also premiered the work at a concert of the Free Music School in December 1865. Rimsky-Korsakov revised the work in 1884.

== Form ==
The symphony is written in the traditional four movements.

1. Largo assai – Allegro (Andante – Allegro in 1865)
2. Andante tranquillo (Scherzo. Vivace in 1865)
3. Scherzo. Vivace (Andante in 1865)
4. Allegro assai (Allegro in 1865)

== Overview ==
=== Composition ===
Before meeting Balakirev, Rimsky-Korsakov had written, among other works, "something like the beginning of a symphony in E♭ minor." These pieces were the fruit of composition lessons with F.A. Kanille, with whom he had begun studying in the fall of 1859. In November 1861, Kanille introduced him to Balakirev. Balakirev approved of the works Rimsky-Korsakov had written thus far, encouraging him to continue work on the symphony. On Balakirev's advice, Rimsky-Korsakov continued writing the opening movement. Balakirev subjected this music to considerable criticism; Rimsky-Korsakov incorporated his suggested changes zealously. Once this movement was finished, Rimsky-Korsakov attempted to orchestrate it and was embarrassed at the results. Balakirev orchestrated the first page of the movement for him. From there, the process went more smoothly.

By the time the navy sent Rimsky-Korsakov on a three-year world cruise in 1862, he had completed the first movement, scherzo and finale of the symphony. He wrote the slow movement during a stop in England, then mailed the score to Balakirev before going back to sea. Upon his return to St. Petersburg in 1865, Balakirev suggested that Rimsky-Korsakov renew work on the symphony. He did, writing a trio for the Scherzo and reorchestrating the whole work. Balakirev conducted the successful premiere of the symphony in December, 1865. Rimsky-Korsakov appeared on stage in uniform to acknowledge the applause (regulations demanded that officers remain in uniform even when off-duty). Seeing him, the audience was surprised a naval officer had written such a work. A second performance quickly followed in March 1866 under the baton of Konstantin Lyadov, father of the composer Anatoly Lyadov.

=== "First Russian Symphony" ===
As leader of "The Five", Balakirev encouraged the use of eastern themes and harmonies to set their "Russian" music apart from the German symphonism of Anton Rubinstein and other Western-orientated composers. Because Rimsky-Korsakov used Russian folk and oriental melodies in his First Symphony, Vladimir Stasov and the other nationalists dubbed it the "First Russian Symphony", even though Rubinstein had written his Ocean Symphony more than 30 years before it. These were themes Balakirev had transcribed in the Caucasus. "The symphony is good," fellow "Five" member César Cui wrote to Rimsky-Korsakov in 1863, while the latter was out on naval deployment. "We played it a few days ago at Balakirev's—to the great pleasure of Stasov. It is really Russian. Only a Russian could have composed it, because it lacks the slightest trace of any stagnant Germanness."

=== Influences ===
Despite Cui's comment, a fair amount of non-Russian influence made its way into the First Symphony. Among the models Rimsky-Korsakov acknowledged were Robert Schumann's Manfred Overture and Third Symphony, Mikhail Glinka's Prince Kholmsky and Jota Aragonesa and Balakirev's King Lear Overture. The influence of Schumann's music proved especially strong. Inexperienced in orchestration, he turned to Hector Berlioz's treatise on orchestration as well as to advice from Balakirev. "I felt that I was ignorant of many things," Rimsky-Korsakov later wrote, "but was convinced that Balakirev knew everything in the world, and he cleverly concealed from me and the others [among 'The Five'] the insufficiency of his information. But in orchestral coloring and combination of instruments he was a good practical hand, and his counsels were invaluable to me."

=== Revision ===
In 1884, Rimsky-Korsakov thoroughly revised his First Symphony. He transposed the key of the symphony itself from E♭ minor to E minor, to enable orchestras to play the work more easily than had previously been able and allow the work to become a repertory piece for student and amateur orchestras. He also reversed the order of slow movement and scherzo and changed the tempo indications of the movements (Allegro became Allegro vivace, and so on).

== Sources ==
- Abraham, Gerald, Slavonic and Romantic Music: Essays and Studies (New York: St. Martin's Press, 1968). Library of Congress Card Catalog #68-13029.
- Abraham, Gerald, ed. Stankey Sadie, The New Grove Dictionary of Music and Musicians, 20 vols. (London: Macmillan, 1980). ISBN 0-333-23111-2.
- Figes, Orlando, Natasha's Dance: A Cultural History of Russia (New York: Metropolitan Books, 2002). ISBN 0-8050-5783-8 (hc.)
- Maes, Francis, tr. Pomerans, Arnold J. and Erica Pomerans, A History of Russian Music: From Kamarinskaya to Babi Yar (Berkeley, Los Angeles and London: University of California Press, 2002). ISBN 0-520-21815-9.
- Rimsky-Korsakov, Nikolai, Letoppis Moyey Muzykalnoy Zhizni (St. Petersburg, 1909), published in English as My Musical Life (New York: Knopf, 1925, 3rd ed. 1942). ISBN n/a.
- Rimsky-Korsakov, Nikolai (1928) [1909]. Летопись моей музыкальной жизни [My Musical Life] (in Russian) (3rd ed.). Moscow: G.I.M.S. – via IMSLP.
