= List of compositions by Mily Balakirev =

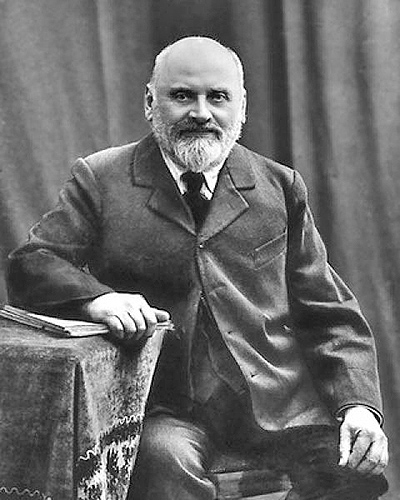
Portrait of Balakirev

The following is a list of compositions by Russian composer Mily Balakirev. All are for solo piano unless otherwise indicated below.

== Works with opus numbers ==
- Piano Concerto No. 1 in F♯ minor, Op. 1 (1855–1856)
- String quartet, Op. 2 (unfinished)
- Octet, Op. 3 (1855–56)
- Grande Fantasie on Russian Folk Songs, Op. 4, for piano and orchestra (1852)
- Piano Sonata No. 1 in B♭ minor, Op. 5 (1855–56)
- Overture on a Spanish March Theme, orchestra, Op. 6 (1857)
- Piano Concerto No. 2 in E♭ major, Op. posth. (1861–1910, unfinished, completed by Sergei Lyapunov)
- Piano Sonata No. 2 in B♭ minor, Op. 102 (1905)

== Works with dates ==
- Reminiscences on Glinka's opera "A Life for the Tsar", fantasy (1854–1855, revised 1899)
- Scherzo No. 1 in B minor (1856)
- Nocturne in G♯ minor, early version Nocturne nr 1 (1856)
- Overture on a Spanish March Theme, orchestra (1857)
- Overture on Three Russian Themes, orchestra (1858)
- King Lear (Korol' Lir), incidental music to Shakespeare's tragedy (1858–1861, orchestra, revised 1902–1905)
- Polka in F♯ minor (1859)
- Mazurka No. 1 in A♭ major (1861–1884)
- Mazurka No. 2 in C♯ minor (1861–1884)
- On the Volga (1863)
- Russia (Rus'), Second Overture on Russian Themes, for orchestra, Symphonic Poem (1863–1864, revised 1884)
- Jota aragonesa (after Glinka) (1864)
- "The Lark" ("Zhavoronok"), piano transcription of No. 10 from A Farewell to Saint Petersburg by Glinka (1864)
- Symphony No. 1 in C major (1864–1866 & 1893–1897)
- Book of folk songs (1866) (including the first known publication of "Song of the Volga Boatmen")
- Overture on Czech Themes "In Bohemia" ("V Chechii"), symphonic poem, orchestra, (1867, revised 1905)
- Tamara, symphonic poem, orchestra (1867–1882)
- Islamey, Oriental fantasy (1869, revised 1902)
- Au jardin (In the Garden), étude-idylle in D♭ major (1884)
- Mazurka No. 3 in B minor (1886)
- Mazurka No. 4 in G♭ major (1886)
- Nocturne No. 1 in B♭ minor (1898)
- Dumka (1900)
- Mazurka No. 5 in D major (1900)
- Scherzo No. 2 in B♭ minor (1900)
- Waltz No. 1 in G major "Valse di bravura" (1900)
- Waltz No. 2 in F minor "Valse mélancolique" (1900)
- Symphony No. 2 in D minor (1900–1908)
- Berceuse in D♭ major (1901)
- Gondellied in A minor (1901)
- Nocturne No. 2 in B minor (1901)
- Scherzo No. 3 in F♯ major (1901)
- Tarantella in B major (1901)
- Waltz No. 3 in D major "Valse-impromptu" (1901)
- Suite in B minor (1901–1908)
- Capriccio in D major (1902)
- Mazurka No. 6 in A♭ major (1902)
- Nocturne No. 3 in D minor (1902)
- Spanish Melody (1902)
- Spanish Serenade (1902)
- Toccata in C♯ minor (1902)
- Tyrolienne (1902)
- Waltz No. 4 in B♭ major "Valse de concert" (1902)
- Cantata on the Inauguration of the Glinka Memorial (dedicated to Mikhail Glinka), chorus and orchestra (1902–1904)
- Chant du pecheur (1903)
- Humoresque in D major (1903)
- Phantasiestück in D♭ major (1903)
- Rêverie in F major (1903)
- Waltz No. 5 in D♭ major (1903)
- Waltz No. 6 in F♯ minor (1903–1904)
- Romance (transcription for piano solo of the second movement of Chopin’s Piano Concerto No. 1, Op. 11) (1905)
- La fileuse in D♭ major (1906)
- Mazurka No. 7 in E♭ minor (1906)
- Novelette in A major (1906)
- Waltz No. 7 in G♯ minor (1906)
- Impromptu (after Chopin's Preludes in E♭ minor and B major) (1907)
- Esquisses (Sonatina) in G major (1909)
- Suite in D Minor of Four Pieces of F. Chopin (1909)

== Undated works ==
- Complainte
- Fantasia
- Overture on the Themes of 3 Russian Songs, for orchestra
- "Say not that love will pass", transcription from a song by Glinka

== Songs with dates ==
- "Spanish Song" ("Ispanskaya pesnya"), for voice and piano (Forgotten Songs No. 3) (1855)
- "The Clear Moon has Risen" (1858)
- "The Knight" (1858) (20 Songs, No. 7)
- "Song of Selim" ("Pesnya Selima") (1858) (20 Songs, No. 11)
- "Hebrew Melody" (20 songs, no. 13) (1859)
- "Over the Lake" ("Nad ozerom"), song for voice and piano (1895–1896) (10 Songs, No. 1)
- "The Wilderness" (10 songs, No. 2) (1895–1896)
- "I Loved Him" ("Ya lyubila ego"), song for voice and piano (10 Songs 1895–96, No. 5)
- "The Pine Tree" (1895–1896) (10 Songs, No. 6)
- "Nocturne" (1895–1896) (10 Songs, No. 7)
- "Vision" ("Son") (10 Songs, No. 2) (1903–04)
- "7th November" (10 Songs, No. 4) (1903–04)
- "The yellow leaf trembles" ("Pesnya: Zholty list") (10 Songs, No. 8) (1903–04)
- "Look, my Friend" ("Vzglyani, moy drug") (20 Songs, No. 6) (1903–04)
- "The Dream" ("Son") (20 songs, No. 20) (1903–04)
- "Dawn" ("Zarya") (1909)

== Undated songs ==
- "Intonation"
- "My Heart Is Torn" ("Tak i rvetsya dusha"), song for voice and piano (20 Songs, No. 9)
- "Selim's Song" ("Pesnya Selima"), for voice and piano (20 Songs, No. 11)
- "The Crescent Moon" ("Vzoshol na nebo mesyats yasnïy"), song for voice and piano (20 Songs, No. 5)
- "Thou Art So Captivating" ("Tï plenitel'noy negi polna"), song for voice and piano (Forgotten Songs, No. 1)
- "Toujours, on me dit 'grand sot'"
- "When I Hear Thy Voice" ("Slïshu li golos tvoy"), song for voice and piano (20 Songs, No. 18)
