= Piano Sonata No. 1 (Scriabin) =

Piano sonata written by Alexander Scriabin

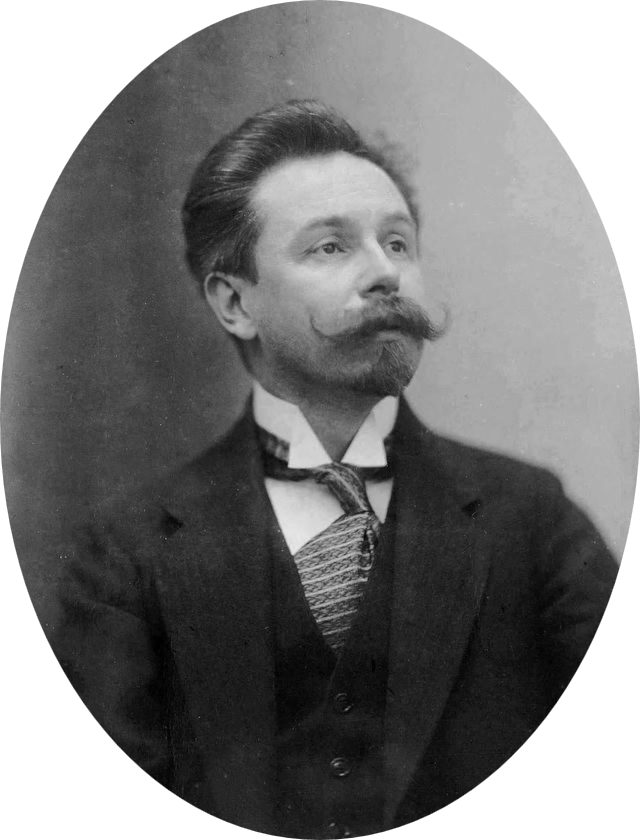
Alexander Scriabin in 1900

The Piano Sonata No. 1 in F minor, Op. 6, by Alexander Scriabin, was the third of twelve piano sonatas that he composed. It was completed in 1892. The music is emotionally charged as much of the music was written after Scriabin had damaged his right hand through excessive piano playing.

== Background ==
Scriabin's very first sonata, one movement in G sharp minor (companion movements have not been found), was only published posthumously and the second, in E♭ minor, was condensed and rewritten to be the single movement Allegro Appassionato Op. 4.

Scriabin was reportedly overpracticing Liszt's Réminiscences de Don Juan and Balakirev's Islamey when he damaged his right hand. He was informed by physicians that he would never play again. The first piano sonata was Scriabin's personal cry against God: the tragedy of the loss of a virtuoso pianist to whimsical fate, God's design. During this period of disability, he wrote the Prelude and Nocturne, op. 9 for left hand alone; however, in due course his right hand recovered.

The temporary loss of his right-hand facility is also credited with inciting him to develop complicated rhythmical patterns for the left hand in much of his music. This quality helps to explain, in part, why many of his pieces are considered quite challenging to perform.

== Structure and content ==
The sonata is in four movements, and takes approximately 18–20 minutes to perform:

1. Allegro con fuoco
2. Adagio
3. Presto
4. Funèbre

The first movement, "Allegro con fuoco", starts with a very dark and passionate opening theme. This grows into a slightly more optimistic climax, but descends again into a forlorn close to the theme. It continues with a melancholy second theme in A♭ major which builds up to the very majestic ending of the 1st movement's exposition. There is a turbulent development section, followed by a recapitulation of the two main themes, in slightly varied form and with the modulations altered to bring the second theme back in F major. The movement ends very quietly, vacillating uncertainly between F minor and major, before settling for F major in the last sustained chord.

The second movement, in C minor, is a melancholic, emotionally charged "Adagio" in ternary form, ending quietly in C major.

The third movement, "Presto", in F minor again, is in a rather condensed and compact Rondo form. The movement is harsh and agitated, relieved briefly only by the more tender middle theme in A♭ major, and angrily hammers into an unresolved end, which is resolved in the final slow movement, the "Funèbre", again in F minor, and similar in mood to the funeral march of Chopin's second piano sonata. The gloom is unrelieved right up to the bleak ending in F minor.

The sonata was published by the prestigious publishing house owned by M.P. Belaieff in 1895 initially as a Sonatina, only later as a sonata.
