= Réminiscences de Don Juan =

Opera fantasy for piano by Franz Liszt

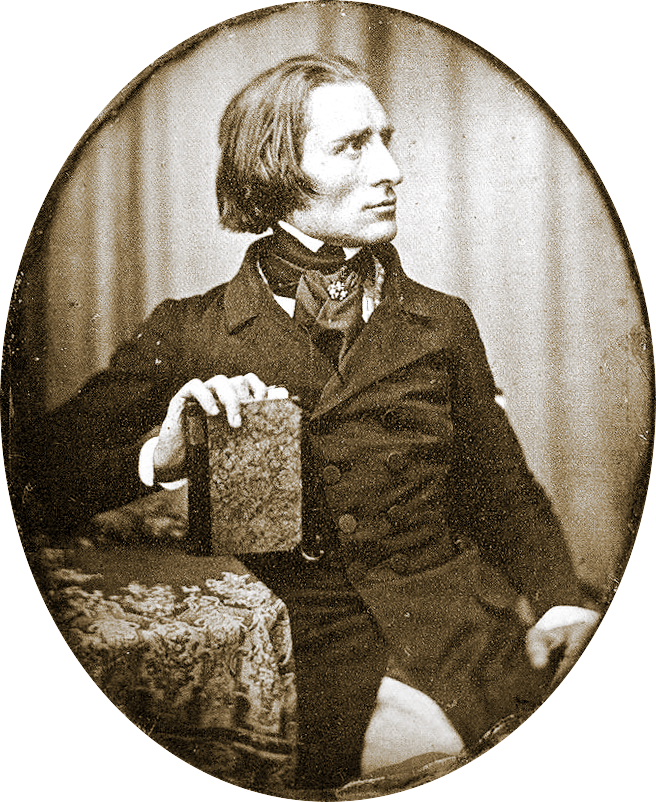
Franz Liszt in 1843

Réminiscences de Don Juan (S. 418) is an opera fantasy for piano by Franz Liszt on themes from Mozart's 1787 opera Don Giovanni.

== Description ==
The piece begins with music sung by the Commendatore, both from the graveyard scene where he threatens Don Giovanni ("Di rider finirai pria dell'aurora! Ribaldo audace! Lascia a' morti la pace!" — "Your laughter will not last, even till morning. Leave the dead in peace!") and from the finale where he condemns Don Giovanni to Hell. The love duet of Don Giovanni and Zerlina follows ("Là ci darem la mano"), along with two variations on this theme, then an extended fantasy on the Champagne aria ("Fin ch'han dal vino"), and finally the work concludes with the Commendatore's threat.

In contrast to perhaps the majority of opera fantasies composed during the nineteenth century, Liszt's Don Giovanni paraphrase is a much more tightly controlled and significant work. Where the standard opera transcription is merely a collection of famous tunes,

The finest of [Liszt's] opera fantasies...are much more than that: they juxtapose different parts of the opera in ways that bring out a new significance, while the original dramatic sense of the individual number and its place within the opera is never out of sight.

== Difficulty ==
Throughout the work, the Réminiscences makes a great number of advanced technical demands on the pianist, among them passages in chromatic thirds, numerous tenths along with occasional stretches that are greater than a tenth, and an instance of rapid leaps in both hands across almost the whole width of the keyboard that, in the words of Heinrich Neuhaus, "with the exception of Ginzburg, probably nobody but the pianola played without smudges."

It is extremely technically demanding and considered to be among the most taxing of Liszt's works and in the entire repertoire. For this reason, and perhaps also because of its length and dramatic intensity, it does not appear in concert programmes as often as Liszt's lighter and more popular pieces, such as the Rigoletto Paraphrase. As Ferruccio Busoni says in the preface to his 1918 edition of the work, the Réminiscences carries "an almost symbolic significance as the highest point of pianism." Liszt wrote the work in 1841 and published a two-piano version (S. 656) in 1877. The two-piano version bears a structurally strong resemblance to the original.

It was the final piece for Vladimir Horowitz's graduation concert at the Kiev Conservatory; at the end all the professors stood up to express their approval. Horowitz, after claiming to Backhaus that the most difficult piano piece he ever played was Liszt's Feux-follets without hesitation, he added that Réminiscences de Don Juan is not an easy piece either. Horowitz had it in his concert programs, as well as the Liszt Sonata, which was not often played at the time, in his early years in Europe.

Alexander Scriabin injured his right hand overpracticing this piece and Balakirev's Islamey, and wrote the funeral march of his First Piano Sonata in memory of his damaged hand.

== Recordings ==
Celebrated recordings of the piece include those by Jorge Bolet, Earl Wild, Tamas Vasary, Simon Barere, Grigory Ginzburg, Louis Kentner, Charles Rosen, Leslie Howard and Leo Sirota. More recent versions have been recorded by Marc-André Hamelin, Valentina Lisitsa, Matthew Cameron, Masaru Okada, Min Kwon, and Lang Lang.

== Sources ==
- Rosen, Charles. 1995. The Romantic Generation. Cambridge, Massachusetts: Harvard University Press. ISBN 978-0-674-77933-4.
- Schonberg, Harold C. (1993). Horowitz: His Life and Music. Touchstone. ISBN 0-671-71223-3. OCLC 1105485907.
