= Piano Concerto (Rimsky-Korsakov) =

- by Nikolai Rimsky-Korsakov
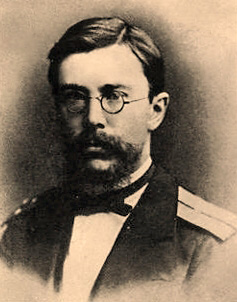
- The composer c. 1870
- Key: C♯ minor
- Opus: 30
- Composed: 1882–83
- Performed: March 1884
- Movements: three

Nikolai Rimsky-Korsakov composed his Piano Concerto in C♯ minor, Op. 30, between 1882 and 1883. It was first performed in March 1884 at one of Mily Balakirev's Free Music School concerts in St. Petersburg.

== Structure ==
The concerto is written in one continuous movement with three contrasting sections:

1. Moderato—Allegretto quasi polacca
2. Andante mosso
3. Allegro

== Overview ==
After a long hiatus, Mily Balakirev reappeared on the Russian music scene in 1881, at the first Free Music School concert of the 1881-82 season. It was Balakirev who suggested that Rimsky-Korsakov write a piano concerto. Rimsky-Korsakov was not a pianist. Nevertheless, as Rimsky-Korsakov wrote, "It must be said that it sounded beautiful and proved entirely satisfactory in the sense of piano technique and style; this greatly astonished Balakirev, who found my concerto to his liking. He had by no means expected that I ... should know how to compose anything entirely pianistic."

Rimsky-Korsakov acknowledged his indebtedness to Franz Liszt in writing this work, dedicating it to him. Like Liszt's concertos, particularly the second, it is in one movement, with sections that contrast yet flow into one another without strict boundaries. It is also Lisztian in its virtuosic decorative pianism. Unlike the Liszt concertos, the Rimsky-Korsakov concerto is monothematic. Rimsky-Korsakov took this theme from No. 18 of Balakirev's collection of folk songs, published in 1866. He puts this song through thematic metamorphosis, again in a Lisztian manner, changing its character and style as the piece progresses. Another potential influence was the Fantasie russe in B minor for piano and orchestra by Eduard Nápravník. Rimsky-Korsakov had conducted this piece in Moscow during the All-Russian Exposition of 1882. Like the Rimsky-Korsakov concerto, the Fantasie is written in a free form, but uses three Russian folk songs instead of just one (including "Song of the Volga Boatmen").

== Influence and neglect ==
The concerto's lyricism, bravura passages and inventive use of folk song placed it firmly in the Russian nationalist camp. It influenced several other Russian composers, including Glazunov, Arensky and, especially in his First Piano Concerto, Rachmaninoff. The work is seldom heard in the West, however, due largely to its brevity (an average performance lasts approximately 18 minutes).

== Sources ==
- Garden, Edward, Liner notes for Hyperion CDA66640, Balakirev & Rimsky-Korsakov Piano Concertos (London: Hyperion Records Inc., 1993).
- Rimsky-Korsakov, Nikolai, My Musical Life.
- Soifertis, Evgeny, Liner notes for Hyperion CDA67511, Nápravník: Concerto Symphonique, Fantasie Russe; Blumenfeld: Allegro (London: Hyperion Records Limited, 2005).
- Swan, Alfred J. Russian Music and Its Sources in Chant and Folk-Song. John Baker LTD: London, 1973. p125.
