= Azanchevsky =

Azanchevsky (Russian: Азанчевский; masculine) or Azanchevskaya (Азанчевская; feminine) is a Russian last name. It is derived from the Turkic word meaning muezzin.

People with the last name

- Mikhail Azanchevsky, director of the St. Petersburg Conservatory in 1871–1876
