= Ossia =

Alternative musical passage in lieu of the original

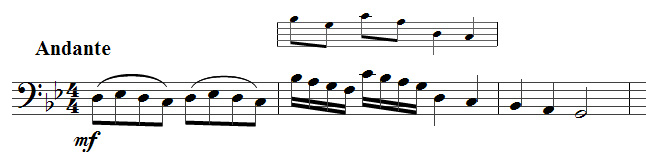
Ossia example (2nd bar) Play original Play ossia

Ossia (Italian: [osˈsiːa]) is a musical term for an alternative passage which may be played instead of the original passage. The word ossia comes from the Italian for "alternatively" and was originally spelled o sia, meaning "or be it".

Ossia passages are very common in opera and solo-piano works. They are usually an easier version of the preferred form of passage, but in Mily Balakirev's Islamey, for instance, the urtext has ossia passages of both types (simpler and more difficult). Bel canto vocal music also frequently uses ossia, also called oppure, passages to illustrate a more embellished version of the vocal line.

On the other hand, an ossia marking does not always indicate a change in difficulty; the piano solo music of Franz Liszt is typically full of alternative passages, often no easier or more difficult than the rest of the piece. This reflects Liszt's desire to leave his options open during a performance. Many of his ossia passages are cadenzas.

An unusual use of ossia is found in Alban Berg's Violin Concerto where several ossia parts are included for the solo violin. If the soloist chooses to play these, the concertmaster is required to play a different ossia (which takes part of the solo violin line that is lost in favor of the soloist's ossia).
