= Simon Barere =

Russian-American pianist (1896–1951)

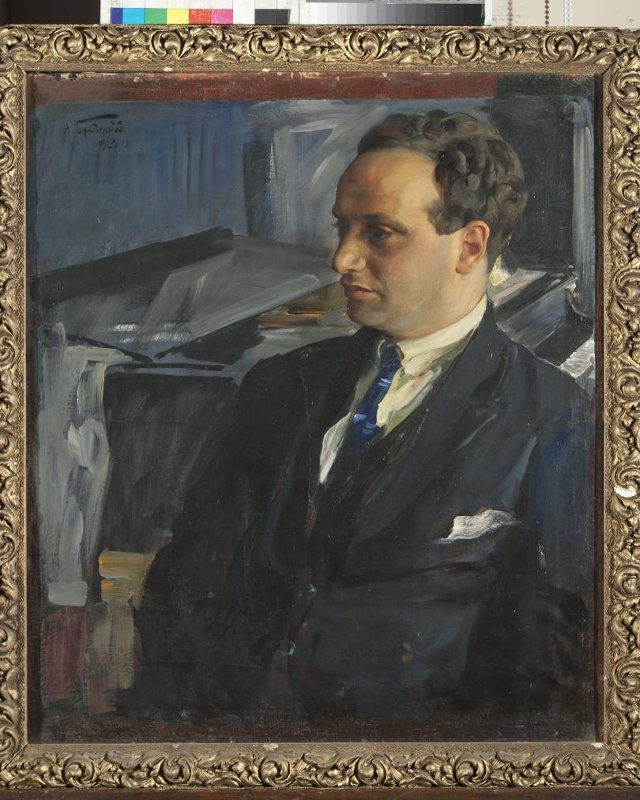
Isaak Brodsky, Simon Barere, 1923, oils; Russian Museum

Simon Barere (Russian: Симон Барер, romanized: Simon Barer; 1 September [O.S. 20 August] 1896 – 2 April 1951) was a Russian-American pianist. His surname is transliterated as Barer, but as an adult, he adopted the spelling Barere in order to reduce the frequency of mispronunciation.

== Biography ==
Barere was born in Odessa in the Russian Empire (present-day Ukraine) as the eleventh of thirteen children in a Jewish family. He studied at the St. Petersburg Conservatory under Anna Yesipova and then Felix Blumenfeld. Pianist Vladimir Horowitz was also a pupil of Blumenfeld, although Barere was Blumenfeld's preferred student. After graduation, he played concerts throughout the region and taught at the Kiev Conservatory. He emigrated to Berlin, then to Sweden, and finally to the United States. During the autumn of 1935, he toured the United Kingdom under the management of Harold Holt, making a number of appearances as supporting artist to Richard Tauber.

Barere was especially known for his speed and finger dexterity; his rendition of Balakirev's Islamey and many other recordings were acclaimed. According to music critic Harold C. Schonberg, Barere produced a colourful piano tone and could also be highly musical.

Barere gave annual recitals at Carnegie Hall which were often recorded by his son, Boris. Among the performances recorded live in 1947 at Carnegie Hall was Liszt's Sonata in B minor, which was released on Remington Records in the 1950s. Other Barere performances include Liszt's Spanish Rhapsody, Reminiscences de Don Juan and Hungarian Rhapsody No. 12, Blumenfeld's Étude for the Left Hand Alone, and Rachmaninoff's Piano Concerto No. 2.

On 2 April 1951, Barere suffered a cerebral hemorrhage during a performance of Grieg's Piano Concerto at Carnegie Hall, with Eugene Ormandy conducting the Philadelphia Orchestra. He collapsed and died backstage shortly thereafter.

== Recordings ==
In 1985, his complete HMV recordings, made at Abbey Road Studios between 1934 and 1936, were remastered by Bryan Crimp and issued by APR. Additional recordings have been issued on CD. Barere made a series of recordings for Remington in March 1951 before his sudden death the following month.

There is also a home recording of Barere playing excerpts from his repertoire, in 1949.
