= Là ci darem la mano =

Duet from the opera Don Giovanni, by Mozart

"Là ci darem la mano"
Cesare Siepi, Hilde Güden, Vienna State Opera, Josef Krips (1955)

"Là ci darem la mano" (Italian for "There we will give each other our hands") is a duet for the characters Don Giovanni (baritone) and Zerlina (soprano) in Mozart's 1787 opera Don Giovanni (act 1, scene 9).

== Text ==
The duet, with words by Lorenzo Da Ponte, is sung during the first act of the opera. Don Giovanni has just met Zerlina and her betrothed, Masetto. In an attempt to distract Masetto and have him removed from the scene, Giovanni offers to host a wedding celebration for the couple at his castle. When Masetto has left, Giovanni attempts to seduce Zerlina to accompany him to his castle. However, after the end of the duet Donna Elvira arrives and thwarts the seduction, and leaves with Zerlina.

Character
Italian text
Poetic translation
Literal translation

Don Giovanni

Là ci darem la mano,
Là mi dirai di sì.
Vedi, non è lontano;
Partiam, ben mio, da qui.

Give me thy hand, oh fairest,
Whisper a gentle 'Yes',
Come, if for me thou carest,
With joy my life to bless.

There we will give each other our hands,
There you will say 'yes' to me.
See, it's not far;
Let's go, my dear, from here.

Zerlina

(Vorrei e non vorrei,
Mi trema un poco il cor.
Felice, è ver, sarei,
Ma può burlarmi ancor.)

I would, and yet I would not,
I dare not give assent,
Alas! I know I should not...
Too late, I may repent.

I would like to, and I wouldn't,
My heart is trembling a little.
True, I could be happy,
But it could trick me again.

Don Giovanni
Vieni, mio bel diletto!
Come, dearest, let me guide thee.
Come, my beautiful delight!
Zerlina
(Mi fa pietà Masetto.)
Masetto sure will chide me!
I feel sorry for Masetto.
Don Giovanni
Io cangierò tua sorte.
Danger shall ne'er come nigh thee!
I will change your fate.
Zerlina
Presto ... non son più forte.
Ah ... that I could deny thee!
Soon ... I won't be strong anymore.
Don Giovanni
Andiam! Andiam!
Let's go! Let's go!
Let's go! Let's go!
Zerlina
Andiam!
Let's go!
Let's go!

Both

Andiam, andiam, mio bene,
a ristorar le pene
d'un innocente amor.

With thee, with thee, my treasure,
This life is nought but pleasure,
My heart is fondly thine.

Let's go, let's go, my dear,
To restore the values
Of an innocent love.

== Music ==
Range
Don Giovanni	Zerlina

"Là ci darem la mano", number 7 in the score, starts in the key of A major with a tempo indication of andante and a time signature of 2/4. The vocal range for Don Giovanni covers E_{3} to E_{4}, Zerlina's range covers E_{4} to F♯_{5}. The piece is labelled a "duettino", a "little duet". This may be because the two roles sing only as a duet towards the very end of the piece, after Zerlina's assenting Andiam!. Until then, Giovanni tries to seduce Zerlina, but she is torn between Giovanni's exhortations and her fidelity to Masetto. Finally, the signal for her submission is a swerving chromatic melodic line, falling over almost an octave during 3 1/2 bars. After a fermata emphasising Zerlina's weakening resolve, the tempo then changes to allegro and the time signature to 6/8. A proper two-part duet, much of it in third parallels, is then sung for most of the remaining 32 bars. A performance takes between 3 and 3 1/2 minutes.

== Literary reference ==
In the Calypso episode of the novel Ulysses by James Joyce, Molly tells her husband Leopold Bloom that she will be singing this duet on her upcoming concert tour organised by Blazes Boylan. Molly is about to commence an affair with Boylan later that day, so this may be an unconscious hint of her intentions.

In chapter XIV of Aldous Huxley's Antic Hay, Theodore Gumbril hums the opening of this aria and imagines his dining partner, Mrs Myra Viveash, as Zerlina, a part she is happy to play, although subconsciously he is thinking of Emily, another married woman with whom he would rather be dining.

In the fourth part of Isak Dinesen's tale (pen name of Karen Blixen), "Babette's Feast", the young Philippa sings this duet with Monsieur Papin, her voice teacher and would-be lover, and through this connection they employ Babette.

== Influence ==
The duet has been the basis of several other works, including:

- Bartolomeo Campagnoli, Air varié, Op. 7, No. 2
- August Eberhard Müller Sonata Op. 7, No. 1, second movement, Andante con variazioni
- Variations on "Là ci darem la mano" for two oboes and English horn, WoO 28 (1796) by Ludwig van Beethoven
- Fantasy on "Là ci darem la mano" for clarinet and orchestra by Franz Danzi (1763–1826)
- August Alexander Klengel, Fuga Nr. 19 A major in 48 Canons and Fugues, Vol. 1
- Francesco Antonio Calegari (c. 1798 — c. 1850), Variazioni sopra "Là ci darem la mano", Op. 18
- Friedrich Kalkbrenner, Fantasie sur "Là ci darem la mano", Op. 33
- Variations for guitar on "Là ci darem la mano" (1828) by Hector Berlioz (lost)
- Nicolas-Charles Bochsa: Air varié sur "Là ci darem la mano", Op. 73, No. 2 (harp)
- Variations on "Là ci darem la mano", Op. 2 (1827) for piano and orchestra, by Frédéric Chopin
- Réminiscences de Don Juan, S. 418 for solo piano, by Franz Liszt
- Sigismond Thalberg, Fantasie et variations sur 2 motifs de Don Juan, Op. 14
- Helene Liebmann: Grande Sonate pour Pianoforte et Violoncelle, Op. 11: III. Andante con variation
