= Free Music School =

Musical academy in Russia

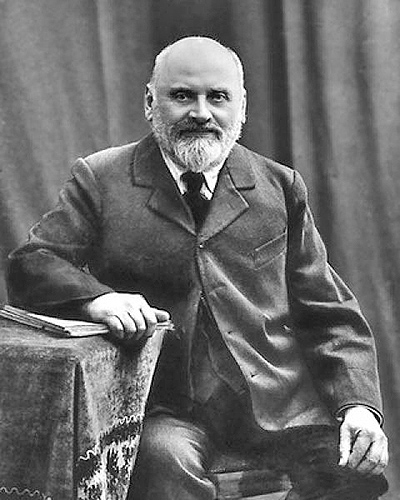
Mily Balakirev, one of the founders of the Free Music School.

The Free Music School (Russian: бесплатная музыкальная школа, abbreviated as BMS or БМШ) was a private music and educational organization in St. Petersburg, Russia founded in 1862 to rival the Saint Petersburg Conservatory.

== Founding and purpose ==
Mily Balakirev and Vladimir Stasov were the main opponents against the musical conventions of the Saint Petersburg Conservatory headed and founded by Anton Rubinstein in 1861. They and others founded the Free Music School in 1862, the School became the stronghold of the Mighty Five (the kuchka): Mily Balakirev, Cesar Cui, Modest Mussorgsky, Alexander Borodin and Rimsky-Korsakov. They feared that German musical principles would stifle the Russian musical form, and so they aimed to cultivate native talent but most of the early members were self-trained amateurs as opposed to their rivals in the Conservatory who enjoyed court connections and were mainly from the gentry.

The Free Music School was conceived by its founders not only as an educational organization, but also as a concert organization (concert fees were an important source of the school's income). Concerts of the BMSh (choral conducted by Lomakin and orchestral by Balakirev) in the 1860s and 1870s became a platform for promoting new Russian music. The quality of the pupils upon their entry is noted to have been relatively low, Cesar Cui noting that most students at the beginning of their studies could not read any music.

== Musical style ==
Early members incorporated the musical stylings of Russian village songs, Cossack, Caucasian dances, church chants and the rhythmic church bell tolls into their music. They tried to reproduce what Mikhail Glinka mentioned, as the 'soul of Russian music'. Mily Balakirev adapted the tonal mutability, the distinctive heterophony and the specific use of parallel fifths, fourths and thirds by studying Volga folk songs in the 1860s.

== Dissolution and successor ==
The school's student body began to drastically reduce by the late 1860s after Gavriil Lomakin stepped away from leadership in 1868, and soon dissolved in 1917 due to the beginning of the revolution. The successor of the BMS in St. Petersburg (since 1918) was the Musical School named after N. A. Rimsky-Korsakov._{[rus]}

== Sources ==
- Stasov V. V. Twenty-fifth anniversary of the Free Music School // IV 1887, No. 3, pp. 599–642; reprint on Sat. articles by Stasov (M., 1953).
- Korabelnikova L.Z. Free music school // Musical Encyclopedia. T.1. M., 1973, column 443.
- Free music school // Petrovskaya I.F. Musical education and musical public organizations in St. Petersburg 1801-1917. Encyclopedia. SPb., 1999, pp. 39–44.
