= Islamey =

Piano music by Balakirev

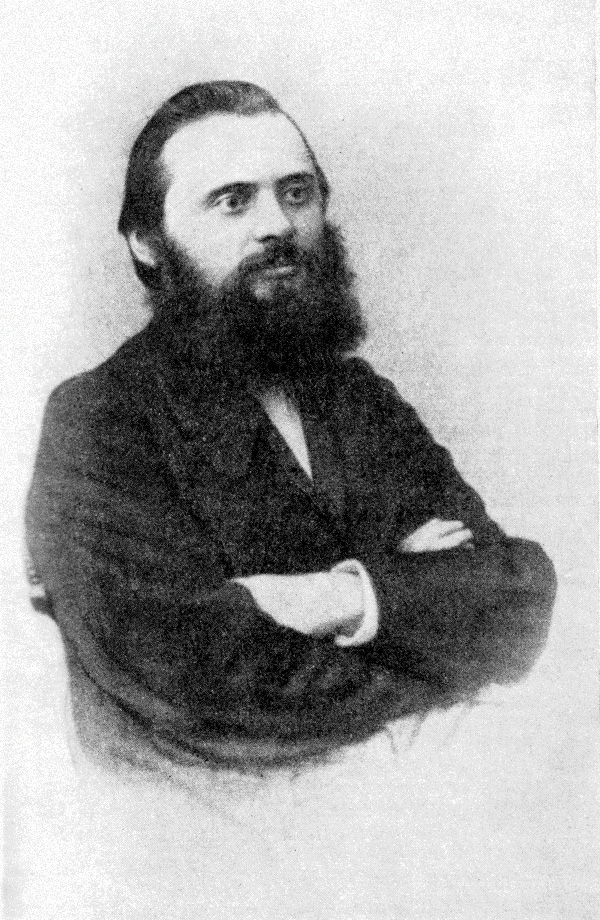
Mily Balakirev in the 1860s

Islamey: an Oriental Fantasy

Islamey: Oriental Fantasy (Russian: Исламей: Восточная фантазия, romanized: Islamey: Vostochnaya fantaziya), is a composition for piano by Russian composer Mily Balakirev written in 1869. Harold C. Schonberg noted that Islamey was "at one time…considered the most difficult of all piano pieces and is still one of the knucklebusters." Its difficulty has led to the creation of numerous ossias (alternative passages) and made it popular as a virtuosic showpiece.

== Composition ==
Balakirev, a committed nationalist whose music was influenced by Russian traditions, was inspired to write the piece after a trip to the Caucasus, as he relates in a letter:

...the majestic beauty of luxuriant nature there and the beauty of the inhabitants that harmonises with it – all these things together made a deep impression on me... Since I interested myself in the vocal music there, I made the acquaintance of a Circassian prince, who frequently came to me and played folk tunes on his instrument, that was something like a violin. One of them, called Islamey, a dance-tune, pleased me extraordinarily and with a view to the work I had in mind on Tamara I began to arrange it for the piano. The second theme was communicated to me in Moscow by an Armenian actor, who came from the Crimea and is, as he assured me, well known among the Crimean Tatars. (Letter to Eduard Reiss (1851–1911), 1892)

The piece was composed in the course of one month in 1869, in stark contrast to Balakirev's usual habit of taking sometimes years to complete a work. In the score he noted that he started the work on 9/21 August in Moscow, and completed it on 13/25 September in Saint Petersburg. Balakirev revised the work in 1902. It is divided into three distinct parts, an opening (Allegro agitato), which introduces the main theme, a middle (Tranquillo – Andantino espressivo) that introduces an entirely new theme (both described in the above quote), and a third (Allegro vivo – Presto furioso), which returns to the main theme.

== Difficulty ==
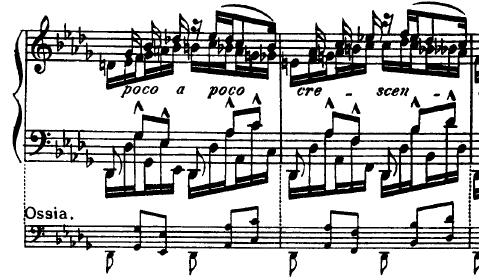
Example of an ossia

The many existing editions have numerous alternative passages (ossias) – most are easier, some are more difficult. This technical difficulty made it a favourite with virtuosos such as Nikolai Rubinstein (who premiered the piece), Franz Liszt, and in recorded history, Simon Barere, Julius Katchen, György Cziffra, Boris Berezovsky, Mikhail Pletnev, Ivo Pogorelić, and Lang Lang. Balakirev, considered a virtuoso pianist in his time, once admitted that there were passages in the piece that he "couldn't manage." In addition, Alexander Scriabin seriously damaged his right hand fanatically practicing the piece along with Liszt's Réminiscences de Don Juan, though the injury eventually healed.

== Legacy and influences ==
Islamey has had a lasting influence on piano solo music; Ravel once remarked to a friend that his goal in writing Gaspard de la nuit was to compose a piece that was "more difficult than Balakirev's Islamey." This turned out to be Scarbo, the third piece in the suite. Alexander Borodin included quotations from the piece in his opera Prince Igor, while Nikolai Rimsky-Korsakov did the same in Scheherazade. The piece has been twice arranged for orchestra, by Alfredo Casella shortly before Balakirev's death, and by Sergei Lyapunov. Eugene Ormandy and the Philadelphia Orchestra recorded Casella's orchestration in stereo on February 26, 1961, for Columbia Records.

Recent musicological work has shown that the melodies that Balakirev preserved in this work are still present in folk music in the former USSR. For instance, the first theme has been found to be a variety of the Lezginka from Kabardino-Balkaria, which differs notably from Balakirev's work in its time signature. The second theme has been demonstrated to have origins related to Balakirev, namely that of a Tatar love song. Balakirev himself indicated in the score that the coda should be played similarly to the Russian Tropak, again a traditional Russian tune.

== Recordings ==
Notable recordings include: Simon Barere (1947, APR), Vladimir Horowitz (1950, Sony/BMG), Emil Gilels (1951, DOREMI), Julius Katchen (1958, Decca), György Cziffra (1957 & 1970, EMI), Boris Berezovsky (1996, Teldec) and Mikhail Pletnev (2000, DG).

== Sources ==
- Preface: Islamei: Orientalische Fantasie. C. F. Peters
