= Symphony No. 2 (Balakirev) =

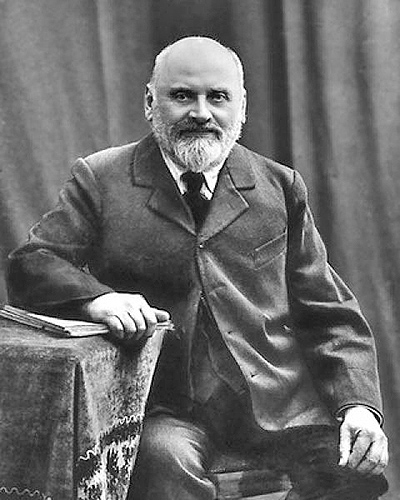
Mily Balakirev in 1900

Mily Balakirev began work on his Symphony No. 2 in D minor in 1900, but he did not complete the work until 1908. The premiere of the symphony was conducted by Russian composer Sergei Liapunov, a student of Balakirev, in St. Petersburg in 1909. Another performance was held in Paris soon afterwards.

== Structure ==
The work features a standard, four-movement structure:

1. Allegro ma non troppo
2. Scherzo alla Cosacca: Allegro non troppo, ma con fuoco ed energico
3. Romanza: Andante
4. Finale: Tempo di Polacca
