= Symphony No. 1 (Balakirev) =

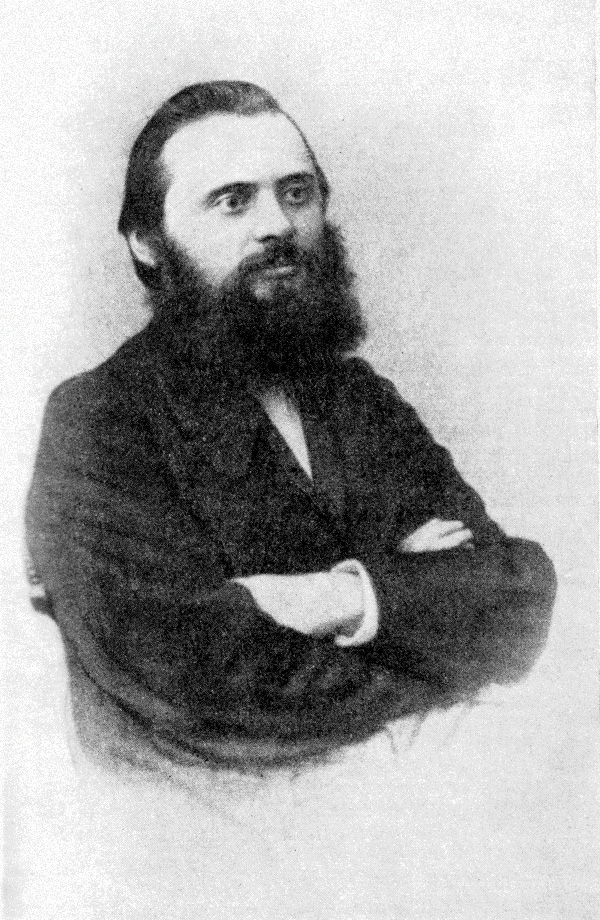
Mily Balakirev in the 1860s

The Symphony No. 1 in C major by Mily Balakirev was commenced as early as 1864, but it was not completed until 1898. It is scored for three flutes (the third doubling piccolo), oboe, English horn, three clarinets (switching between B flat and A instruments), two bassoons, four horns, two trumpets, three trombones, tuba, timpani, triangle, cymbals, snare drum, bass drum, two harps, first and second violins, violas, cellos and double basses.

== Revision ==
Balakirev revised the symphony but the publisher Zimmerman does not mark the printing of the second version as different, and scores and parts of the two versions were sometimes mixed up. One way to tell them apart is that the first version has rehearsal figures going up to 15, 10, 7, and 16 but in the second version they go to 26, 14, 14, 26. The more obvious textual changes occur in the third movement.

== Description ==
The piece is in four movements:

1. Largo – Allegro vivo
2. Scherzo. Vivo – Poco meno mosso – Tempo I
3. Andante
4. Finale. Allegro moderato

== Performances ==
Sketching began in 1864 but the first performance, with Balakirev himself conducting, did not take place until 1898. In 1949, Herbert von Karajan recorded it with the Philharmonia Orchestra. In December 1955, Sir Thomas Beecham and the Royal Philharmonic Orchestra made the first stereo recording in the U.K..

The British premiere took place on 26 September 1901 at the Promenade Concerts, under the baton of Henry Wood at Queen's Hall.

There is also a recording of a concert performance with Beecham conducting the BBC Symphony Orchestra. Yevgeny Svetlanov recorded it in 1971, with the USSR Symphony Orchestra. It was later recorded digitally by Neeme Järvi for EMI Classics. A modern recording by the Russian State Symphony Orchestra, conducted by Igor Golovschin, is also available, as well as one from the BBC Philharmonic Orchestra with Vassily Sinaisky as conductor.
