= Tamara (symphonic poem) =

Balakirev 's tone poem based on legends surrounding Queen Tamara of Georgia

Tamara is a symphonic poem by Mily Balakirev, written in 1882. The basis was the ballad of the same name by Mikhail Lermontov, Tamara ("In the deep gully of Dariala..."), written by the poet around 1837 under the impression of the old Georgian legend apparently heard in the Caucasus as a fantastic depiction of the Queen Tamar of Georgia.

The original idea of the poem occurred to Balakirev under the influence of his trips to the Caucasus in 1862 and 1863. According to the memoirs of N. Rimsky-Korsakov in the autumn of 1866, M. A. Balakirev "more and more often played themes for orchestral fantasy 'Tamara'". The severe crisis that struck the composer in the early 1870s interrupted his work - it was only in 1876, at the insistence of M. Glinka’s sister, L. I. Shestakova, that Balakirev resumed the composition. The poem was completed in 1882 and first performed on 7 (19) March 1882 in St. Petersburg, at a concert of the Free Music School under the direction of the composer.

It was then performed twice in Paris, at the Concerts Lamoureux. In 1884 it was printed by P.I. Jurgenson.

== Overview ==
In the prologue of the symphonic poem the theme of the majestic Caucasian landscape sounds: gloomy sounds of low strings against the background of continuous murmur of kettledrums - in the gorge of Daryal Terek valley roaring menacingly. Then appears the love call of the Tsarina Tamara presented by the English horn later repeated by the oboe, which brings the traveler to the mysterious castle. The main part of the poem - Allegro moderato ma agitato - begins with passionate theme of the viola section; then the music is based on the rhythms of oriental Turkish-Iranian melodies, which leads the listener to the orgy scene, where the themes of Caucasian dances are heard. The painting full of passion ends with an epilogue - Andante - with music similar to the introduction.

== In Diaghilev's enterprise ==
Sergei Diaghilev, who met Balakirev in 1893, in 1907 included "Tamara" in the repertoire of "Russian historical concerts" organized by him in Paris, held at the Théâtre du Grand Opéra and attracted the attention of the French music community. Most of the works of Russian symphony and opera music presented in these five concerts were subsequently transferred by Diaghilev to the ballet stage. The score of the poem was used for the eponymous production (also known as Thamar) of the Russian Seasons (Ballets russes) in 1912. The libretto and the design were created by Léon Bakst, choreography by Michel Fokine. The main roles were performed by Tamara Karsavina and Adolph Bolm, the premiere took place at the Châtelet Theatre in Paris on 20 May 1912.
