= Mikhail Azanchevsky =

Mikhail Pavlovich Azanchevsky Михаил Павлович Азанчевский
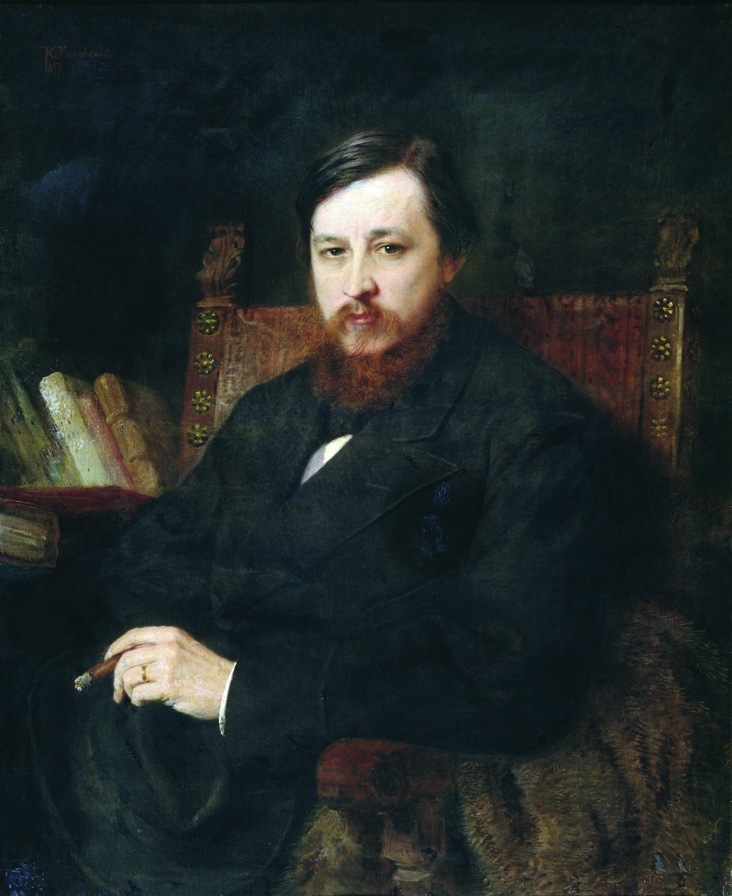
- Portrait of the Composer M. P. Azanchevsky, by Konstantin Makovsky, 1877

Background information
- Born: March 24 [O.S. April 5] 1839; Moscow, Russia
- Died: January 12 [O.S. January 24] 1881 (age 41) Moscow
- Occupations: composer, music teacher

Mikhail Pavlovich (von) Azanchevsky (Russian: Михаи́л Па́влович (фон) Азанче́вский; April 5 [O.S. March 24] 1839 – January 24 [O.S. January 12] 1881) was a Russian composer and music teacher. He was the director of the St. Petersburg Conservatory in 1871–1876. Not long before his death, Edward Dannreuther called him "one of the most cultivated of living Russian musicians," and commented on "the delicate finish of diction and form which characterises his compositions, as well as for the extensive range of his knowledge in musical matters generally."

== Life ==
He was born in Moscow, the son of the writer Pavel Azanchevsky. He completed his education in counterpoint and composition under Moritz Hauptmann and Ernst Richter at Leipzig Conservatory between the years 1861 and 1864, and lived during some years subsequently, alternately at Paris and at St. Petersburg. He acquired a reputation among book-collectors as the possessor of one of the finest private libraries of works upon music in Europe.

== Works ==
Among his best-known compositions are:

- Op. 2, Sonata in B minor for pianoforte and violoncello
- Op. 6, Passatempo for piano four hands
- Op. 10, Trio in F sharp minor for piano and strings
- Op. 12, Fest-Polonaise for two pianofortes
