= Mily Balakirev =

Russian composer and pianist (1837–1910)

- Милий Балакирев
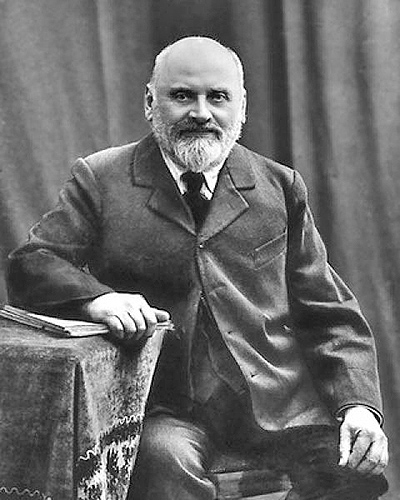
- Balakirev in 1900
- Born: 2 January 1837 [O.S. 21 December 1836] Nizhny Novgorod, Russia
- Died: 29 May [O.S. 16 May] 1910 (aged 73); Saint Petersburg, Russia
- Occupations: Pianist; composer; conductor
- Works: List of compositions

Mily Alexeyevich Balakirev (UK: /bəˈlækɪrɛv, -ˈlɑːk-/ bə-LA(H)K-i-rev, US: /ˌbɑːlɑːˈkɪərɛf/ BAH-lah-KEER-ef; Russian: Милий Алексеевич Балакирев, (Note: BGN/PCGN romanization: Miliy Alekseyevich Balakirev; ALA-LC system: Miliĭ Alekseevich Balakirev; ISO 9 system: Milij Alekseevič Balakirev.) pronounced [ˈmʲilʲɪj ɐlʲɪkˈsʲe(j)ɪvʲɪdʑ bɐˈlakʲɪrʲɪf]; 2 January 1837 [O.S. 21 December 1836] – 29 May [O.S. 16 May] 1910) (Note: Russia was still using old style dates in the 19th century, and information sources used in the article sometimes report dates as old style rather than new style. Dates in the article are taken verbatim from the source and therefore are in the same style as the source from which they come.) was a Russian composer, pianist, and conductor known today primarily for his work promoting musical nationalism and his encouragement of more famous Russian composers, notably Pyotr Ilyich Tchaikovsky. He began his career as a pivotal figure, extending the fusion of traditional folk music and experimental classical music practices begun by composer Mikhail Glinka. In the process, Balakirev developed musical patterns that could express overt nationalistic feeling. After a nervous breakdown and consequent sabbatical, he returned to classical music but did not wield the same level of influence as before.

In conjunction with critic and fellow nationalist Vladimir Stasov, in the late 1850s and early 1860s, Balakirev brought together the composers now known as The Five (a.k.a., The Mighty Handful) – the others were Alexander Borodin, César Cui, Modest Mussorgsky, and Nikolai Rimsky-Korsakov. For several years, Balakirev was the only professional musician of the group; the others were amateurs limited in musical education. He imparted to them his musical beliefs, which continued to underlie their thinking long after he left the group in 1871, and encouraged their compositional efforts. While his methods could be dictatorial, the results of his influence were several works which established these composers' reputations individually and as a group. He performed a similar function for Tchaikovsky at two points in the latter's career – in 1868–69 with the fantasy-overture Romeo and Juliet, and in 1882–85 with the Manfred Symphony.

As a composer, Balakirev finished major works many years after he had started them; he began his First Symphony in 1864 but completed it in 1897. The exception to this was his oriental fantasy Islamey for solo piano, which he composed quickly and remains popular among virtuosos. Often, the musical ideas normally associated with Rimsky-Korsakov or Borodin originated in Balakirev's compositions, which Balakirev played at informal gatherings of The Five. However, his slow pace in completing works for the public deprived him of credit for his inventiveness, and pieces that would have enjoyed success had they been completed in the 1860s and 1870s made a much smaller impact.

Balakirev began work on a second symphony, Symphony No. 2 in D minor in 1900, but did not complete the work until 1908.

== Life ==
=== Early years ===
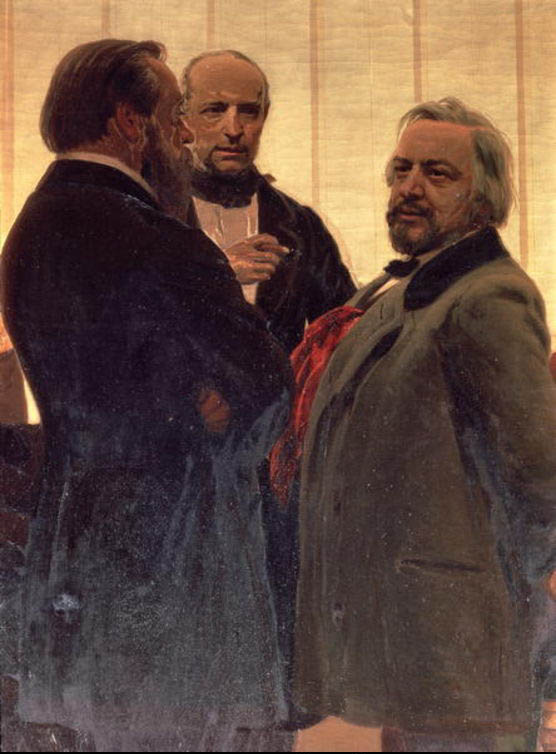
Portrait of (left to right) Balakirev, Vladimir Odoevsky and Mikhail Glinka by Ilya Repin. The painting is somewhat anachronistic – Balakirev is depicted as a man approaching middle age, with a full beard; however, Glinka died in 1857, when Balakirev was only 20 years old.

Balakirev was born in Nizhny Novgorod into a noble Russian family. His father, Alexey Konstantinovich Balakirev (1809–1869), was a titular councillor who belonged to the ancient dynasty founded by Ivan Vasilievich Balakirev, a Moscow boyar and voivode who led the Russian army against the Khanate of Kazan during the 1544 expedition (Alexey's branch traced its history to Andrei Simonovich Balakirev who played a part in defending the city in the 1618 Siege of Moscow and was granted lands in Nizhny Novgorod). The legend of a supposed Tatar ancestor who was baptized and took part in the Battle of Kulikovo as Dmitry Donskoy's personal khorunzhyi that circulated among fellow composers was made up by Balakirev and does not find any proof.

Mily's mother was Elizaveta Ivanovna Balakireva (née Yasherova). The noble title was first granted to her father Ivan Vasilievich Yasherov who went a long way from a collegiate registrar to a State Councillor. The name Mily (either from Russian miliy — nice, or from Greek Milos — the island of the same name) was a traditional male name in her family. She gave piano lessons to her son since the age of four, and when he turned ten she took him to Moscow during the summer holidays for a course of ten piano lessons with Alexander Dubuque. She died in 1847 from smallpox.

Balakirev studied at the Nizhny Novgorod gymnasium. After his mother's death, he was transferred to the Nizhny Novgorod Noble Institute of Alexander II where he studied from 1849 to 1853. Balakirev's musical talents did not remain unnoticed, as he soon found a patron in Alexander Ulybyshev (Oulibicheff). Ulybyshev was considered the leading musical figure and patron in Nizhny Novgorod; he owned a vast musical library and was the author of a biography of Wolfgang Amadeus Mozart and other books on Mozart and Ludwig van Beethoven.

Balakirev's musical education was placed in the hands of the pianist Karl Eisrach, who also arranged the regular musical evenings at the Ulybyshev estate. Through Eisrach, Balakirev was given opportunities to read, play and listen to music and was exposed to the music of Frédéric Chopin and Mikhail Glinka. Eisrach and Ulybyshev also allowed Balakirev to rehearse the count's private orchestra in rehearsals of orchestral and choral works. Eventually, Balakirev, still aged only 14, led a performance of Mozart's Requiem. At age 15, he was allowed to lead rehearsals of Beethoven's First and Eighth Symphonies. His earliest surviving compositions date from the same year—the first movement of a septet for flute, clarinet, piano and strings and a Grande Fantasie on Russian Folksongs for piano and orchestra. The first movement survives of an octet for piano, flute, oboe, horn, violin, viola, cello, and double bass and dates from 1855.

Balakirev left the Alexandrovsky Institute in 1853 and entered the University of Kazan as a mathematics student, along with his friend Pyotr Boborykin, who later became a novelist. He was soon noted in local society as a pianist and was able to supplement his limited finances by taking pupils. His holidays were spent either at Nizhny Novgorod or on the Ulybyshev country estate at Lukino, where he played numerous Beethoven sonatas to help his patron with his book on the composer. Works from this period include a piano fantasy based on themes from Glinka's opera A Life for the Tsar, an attempt at a string quartet, three songs which would eventually be published in 1908 and the opening movement (the only one completed) of his First Piano Concerto.

After Balakirev completed his courses in the late autumn of 1855, Ulybyshev took him to Saint Petersburg, where he met Glinka. While Glinka considered Balakirev's compositional technique defective (there were as yet no music textbooks in Russian and Balakirev's German was barely adequate), he thought highly of his talent, encouraging him to take up music as a career. Their acquaintance was marked by discussions, by Glinka passing several Spanish musical themes to Balakirev, and with Glinka entrusting the young man with the musical education of his four-year-old niece. Balakirev made his debut in a university concert in February 1856, playing the completed movement from his First Piano Concerto. This was followed a month later with a concert of his piano and chamber compositions. In 1858, he played the solo part in Beethoven's Emperor Concerto before the Tsar. In 1859, he had 12 songs published. Nevertheless, he was still in extreme poverty, supporting himself mainly by giving piano lessons (sometimes nine a day) and by playing at soirées given by the aristocracy.

=== The Five ===
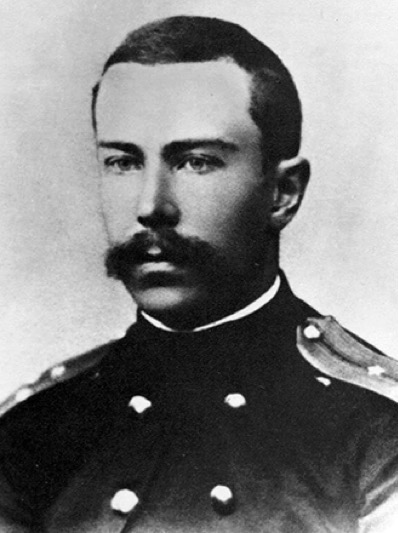
Rimsky-Korsakov as a naval cadet, at the time he met Balakirev

The deaths of Glinka in 1857 and Ulybyshev the following year left Balakirev without influential supporters. Nevertheless, his time with Glinka had sparked a passion for Russian nationalism within Balakirev, leading him to adopt the stance that Russia should have its own distinct school of music, free from Southern and Western European influences. He had also started meeting other important figures who would abet him in this goal in 1856, including César Cui, Alexander Serov, the Stasov brothers and Alexander Dargomyzhsky. He now gathered around him composers with similar ideals, whom he promised to train according to his own principles. These included Modest Mussorgsky in 1858, Nikolai Rimsky-Korsakov in November 1861 and Alexander Borodin in November or December 1862. Together with Cui, these men were described by noted critic Vladimir Stasov as "a mighty handful" (Russian: Могучая кучка, Moguchaya kuchka), but they eventually became better known in English simply as The Five.

As an instructor and influence of magnetic personality, Balakirev inspired his comrades to improbable heights of musical creativity. However, he vehemently opposed academic training, considering it a threat to the musical imagination. It was better in his view to begin composing right away and learn through that act of creation. This line of reasoning could be argued as a rationalization to his own lack of technical training. He had been trained as a pianist and had to discover his own way to becoming a composer. Rimsky-Korsakov eventually realized as much, but nevertheless wrote:

Balakirev, who had never had any systematic course in harmony and counterpoint and had not even superficially applied himself to them, evidently thought such studies quite unnecessary.... An excellent pianist, a superior sight reader of music, a splendid improviser, endowed by nature with a sense of correct harmony and part-writing, he possessed a technique partly native and partly acquired through a vast musical erudition, with the help of an extraordinarily keen and retentive memory, which means so much in steering a critical course in musical literature. Then, too, he was a marvelous critic, especially a technical critic. He instantly felt every technical imperfection or error, he grasped a defect in form at once.

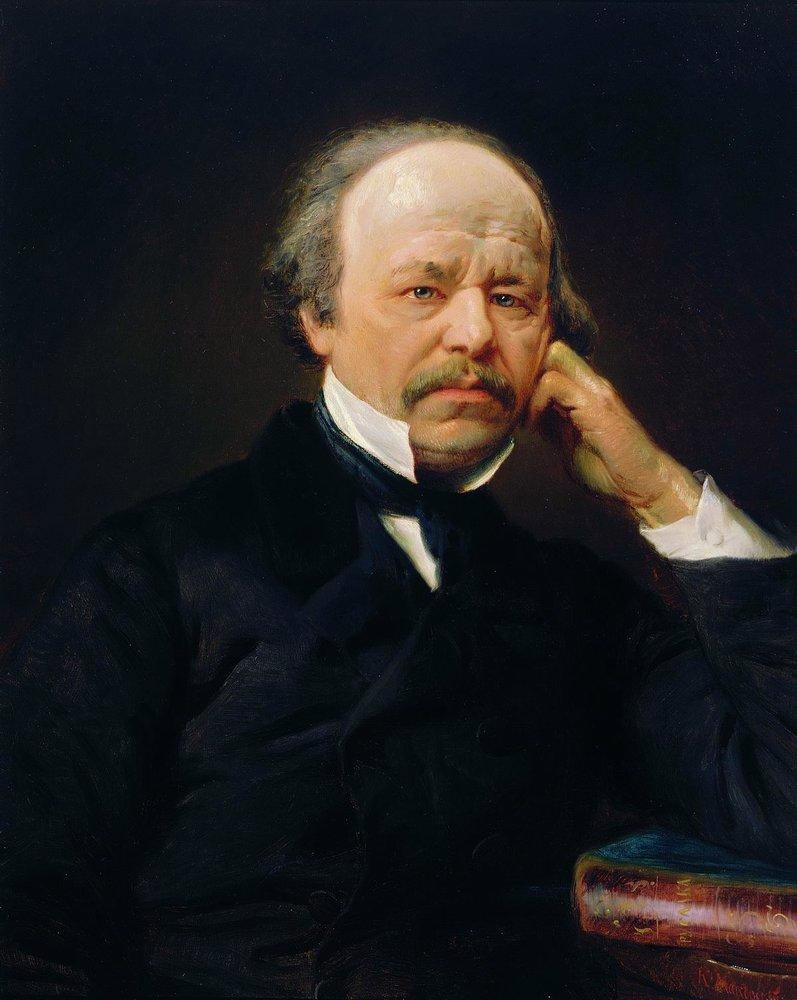
Alexander Dargomyzhsky eventually replaced Balakirev as a mentor to The Five

Balakirev had the musical experience that the others in The Five lacked, and he instructed them much as he instructed himself—by an empirical approach, learning how other composers solved various problems by sifting through their scores and seeing how they addressed those challenges. While this approach may have been helpful for Balakirev, Rimsky-Korsakov writes, it was not so helpful for individuals completely different in nature from Balakirev or who matured as composers "at different intervals and in a different manner".

Balakirev's eventual undoing was his demand that his students' musical tastes coincide exactly with his own, with the slightest deviation prohibited. Whenever one of them played one of his own compositions for Balakirev, Balakirev would seat himself at the piano and show, through improvisation, how he felt the composition should be changed. Passages in other people's works came out sounding like his music, not their own. By the late 1860s, Mussorgsky and Rimsky-Korsakov stopped accepting what they now considered his high-handed meddling with their work, and Stasov began to distance himself from Balakirev. The other members of The Five also became interested in writing opera, a genre Balakirev did not consider highly, after the success of Alexander Serov's opera Judith in 1863, and gravitated toward Alexander Dargomyzhsky as a mentor in this field.

=== Saint Petersburg Conservatory and Free School of Music ===
The formation of The Five paralleled the early years of Tsar Alexander II, a time of innovation and reform in the political and social climate in Russia. The Russian Musical Society (RMS) and the musical conservatories in St. Petersburg and Moscow were all established at this time. While these institutions had powerful champions in Anton Rubinstein and Nikolai Rubinstein, others feared the influence of German instructors and musical precepts into Russian classical music. Balakirev's sympathies and closest contacts were in the latter camp, and he frequently made derogatory comments about the German "routine" which, he believed, came at the expense of the composer's originality.

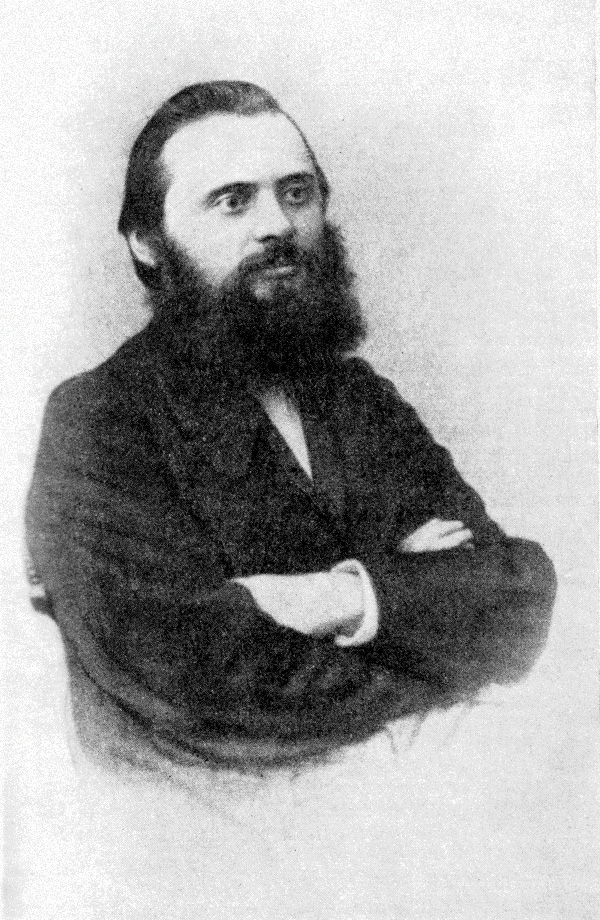
Balakirev in the 1860s

Balakirev was outspoken in his opposition to Anton Rubinstein's efforts. This opposition was partly ideological and partly personal. Anton Rubinstein was at that time the only Russian able to live on his art, while Balakirev had to live on income from piano lessons and recitals played in the salons of the aristocracy. At stake was a viable career in music as artistic director of the Russian Musical Society. Balakirev attacked Rubinstein for his conservative musical tastes, especially for his leaning on German masters such as Mendelssohn and Beethoven, and for his insistence on professional musical training. Balakirev's followers were similarly outspoken. Mussorgsky, for instance, called the Saint Petersburg Conservatory a place where Rubinstein and Nikolai Zaremba, who taught music theory there, dressed "in professional, antimusical togas, first pollute their students' minds, then seal them with various abominations." There was also a petty, personal side to Balakirev's attacks. Rubinstein had written an article in 1855 that was critical of Glinka. Glinka had taken the article badly, and Balakirev likewise took Rubinstein's criticism personally. Moreover, Rubinstein was of German and Jewish descent, and Balakirev's comments were at times anti-Semitic and xenophobic.

The pro-Conservatory followers publicly called The Five "amateurs"—a justified charge, as Balakirev was the only professional musician of the group. To counteract these criticisms and to aid in the creation of a distinctly "Russian" school of music, Balakirev and Gavriil Lomakin, a local choirmaster, founded the Free Music School in 1862. Like the RMS, the Free School offered concerts as well as education. Unlike the RMS, the Free School offered music education at no charge to students. The school also emphasized singing, especially choral singing, to meet the demands of the Russian Orthodox Church. Lomakin was appointed director, with Balakirev serving as his assistant. To raise funds for the school, Balakirev conducted orchestral concerts between 1862 and 1867, while Lomakin conducted choral ones. These concerts offered less conservative programming musically than the RMS concerts. They included the music of Hector Berlioz, Robert Schumann, Franz Liszt, Glinka and Alexander Dargomyzhsky, and the first works of The Five.

=== Mature works and Prague visit ===
Balakirev spent the summer of 1862 in the Caucasus, mainly in Essentuki, and was impressed enough by the region to return there the following year and in 1868. He noted down folk tunes from that region and from Georgia and Iran; these tunes would play an important part in his musical development. One of the first compositions to show this influence was his setting of Alexander Pushkin's "Georgian song", while a quasi-oriental style appeared in other songs. In 1864, Balakirev considered writing an opera based on the folk legend of the Firebird (a subject upon which Igor Stravinsky would later base his ballet The Firebird), but abandoned the project due to the lack of a suitable libretto. He completed his Second Overture on Russian Themes that same year (1864), which was performed that April at a Free School concert and published in 1869 as a "musical picture" with the title 1000 Years.

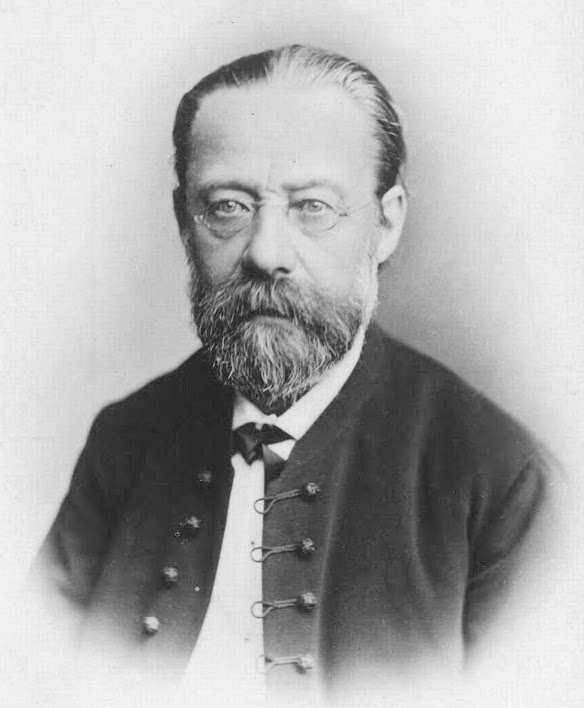
Bedřich Smetana, with whom Balakirev quarreled over the Prague production of Glinka's opera A Life for the Tsar

In 1866, Balakirev's Collection of Russian Folksongs were published. These arrangements showed great insight into the rhythm, harmony and types of song, although the key signatures and elaborate textures of the piano accompaniments were not as idiomatic. He also started a Symphony in C major, of which he completed much of the first movement, scherzo and finale by 1866. Even at this point, however, Balakirev had trouble finishing large works; the symphony would not be finished until decades later. He began a second piano concerto in the summer of 1861, with a slow movement thematically connected with a requiem that occupied him at the same time. He did not finish the opening movement until the following year, then set aside the work for 50 years. He suffered from periods of acute depression, longed for death and thought about destroying all his manuscripts. He was still able to complete some works quickly. He began the original version of Islamey in August 1869, finishing it a month later. Nikolai Rubinstein premiered the "oriental fantasy," which Balakirev considered a sketch for his symphonic poem Tamara, that December.

Balakirev also intermittently spent time editing Glinka's works for publication, on behalf of the composer's sister, Lyudmilla Shestakova. At her behest, he travelled to Prague in 1866 to arrange the production of Glinka's operas there. This project was delayed due to the Austro-Prussian War until the following year. The Prague production of A Life for the Tsar under the direction of Bedřich Smetana reportedly horrified Balakirev, with Balakirev taking issue with the musical tempos, the casting of various roles, and the costumes—"[i]t was as though Smetana was trying to turn the whole piece into a farce." "[F]ive weeks of quarrels, intrigues by Smetana and his party, and intensive rehearsals" followed, with Balakirev attending every rehearsal. Balakirev suspected Smetana and others were influenced by pro-Polish elements of the Czech press, which labeled the production a "Tsarist intrigue" paid for by the Russian government. He had difficulties with the production of Ruslan and Lyudmila under his direction, with the Czechs initially refusing to pay for the cost of copying the orchestral parts, and the piano reduction of the score, from which Balakirev was conducting rehearsals, mysteriously disappearing. Biographer Mikhail Tsetlin (aka Mikhail Zetlin) writes, "It is hard to say, nowadays, whether Balakirev's suspicions were fully justified or whether they were partly due to his own high-strung disposition." Regardless, though A Life for the Tsar and Ruslan and Lyudmila were successes, Balakirev's lack of tact and despotic nature created considerable ill feelings between him and others involved. Afterwards, he and Smetana no longer spoke to each other.

During this visit, Balakirev sketched and partly orchestrated an Overture on Czech Themes; this work would be performed at a May 1867 Free School concert given in honor of Slav visitors to the All-Russian Ethnographical Exhibition in Moscow. This was the concert for which, in his review, Vladimir Stasov coined the phrase Moguchaya kuchka ("Mighty Handful") to describe The Five.

Balakirev encouraged Rimsky-Korsakov and Borodin to complete their first symphonies, whose premieres he conducted in December 1865 and January 1869 respectively. He also conducted the first performance of Mussorgsky's The Destruction of Sennacherib in March 1867 and the Polonaise from Boris Godunov in April 1872.

=== Waning influence and friendship with Tchaikovsky ===
When Anton Rubinstein relinquished directorship of the RMS concerts in 1867, Balakirev was suggested to replace him. The conservative patron for the RMS, Grand Duchess Elena Pavlovna, agreed—provided Nikolai Zaremba, who had taken over for Rubinstein at the Saint Petersburg Conservatory was also appointed, along with a distinguished foreign composer. The choice of Berlioz as foreign conductor was widely lauded, but Balakirev's appointment was seen less enthusiastically. Balakirev's uncompromising nature caused tension at the RMS, and his preference for modern repertoire earned him the enmity of Elena Pavlovna. In 1869, she informed him that his services were no longer required.

Pyotr Ilyich Tchaikovsky at the time he wrote Romeo and Juliet with Balakirev's support

The week after Balakirev's dismissal, an impassioned article in his defense appeared in The Contemporary Chronicle. The author was Pyotr Ilyich Tchaikovsky. Balakirev had conducted Tchaikovsky's symphonic poem Fatum and the "Characteristic Dances" from his opera The Voyevoda at the RMS, and Fatum had been dedicated to Balakirev. The appearance of Tchaikovsky's article may have been calculated, as he knew Elena Pavlovna was due in Moscow, where he lived, the day the article was to appear. He sent two notes to Balakirev; the first alerted him to Elena Pavlovna's planned presence in Moscow, and the second thanked Balakirev for criticisms he had made about Fatum just after conducting it. Balakirev's immediate response was positive and enthusiastic.

This exchange of letters grew into a friendship and a creative collaboration over the next two years, with Balakirev helping Tchaikovsky produce his first masterpiece, the fantasy-overture Romeo and Juliet. After Romeo and Juliet, the two men drifted apart as Balakirev took a sabbatical from the music world. In 1880, Balakirev received a copy of the final version of the score of Romeo from Tchaikovsky, care of the music publisher Besel. Delighted Tchaikovsky had not forgotten him, he replied with an invitation for Tchaikovsky to visit him in Saint Petersburg. In the same letter, he forwarded the programme for a symphony, based on Lord Byron's poem Manfred, which Balakirev was convinced Tchaikovsky "would handle wonderfully well." This programme had originally been penned by Stasov for Hector Berlioz. Tchaikovsky initially refused, but two years later changed his mind, partly due to Balakirev's continued prodding over the project. The Manfred Symphony, finished in 1885, became the largest, most complex work Tchaikovsky had written to that point. As with Romeo and Juliet and Fatum, Tchaikovsky dedicated the Manfred Symphony to Balakirev.

When Lomakin resigned as director of the Free Music School in February 1868, Balakirev took his place there. Once he had left the RMS, he concentrated on building attendance for concerts of the Free Music School. He decided to recruit popular soloists and found Nikolai Rubinstein ready to help. Elena Pavlovna was furious. She decided to raise the social level of the RMS concerts by attending them personally with her court. This rivalry caused financial difficulties for both concert societies as RMS membership declined and the Free Music School continued to suffer from chronic money troubles. Soon the Free Music School could not pay Balakirev and had to cut its 1870–71 series short. The RMS then scored the coup de grâce of assigning its programming to Mikhaíl Azanchevsky, who also took over as director of the Saint Petersburg Conservatory in 1871. Azanchevsky was more progressively-minded musically than his predecessors, a staunch believer in contemporary music on the whole and Russian contemporary music in particular. For the opening concert of the RMS 1871–72 season, he had conductor Eduard Nápravník present the first public performances of Tchaikovsky's Romeo and Juliet and the polonaise from Mussorgsky's Boris Godunov. This implicit recognition of Balakirev's ideas made his own concerts seem unnecessary and redundant. Balakirev then hoped that a solo recital in his hometown of Nizhny Novgorod in September 1870 would restore his reputation and prove profitable. Neither happened—he played to an empty house, and the profits of the recital amounted to 11 rubles. Added to these professional troubles were the death of his father in June 1869, and the financial responsibility for his younger sisters resulting from it.

=== Breakdown and return to music ===
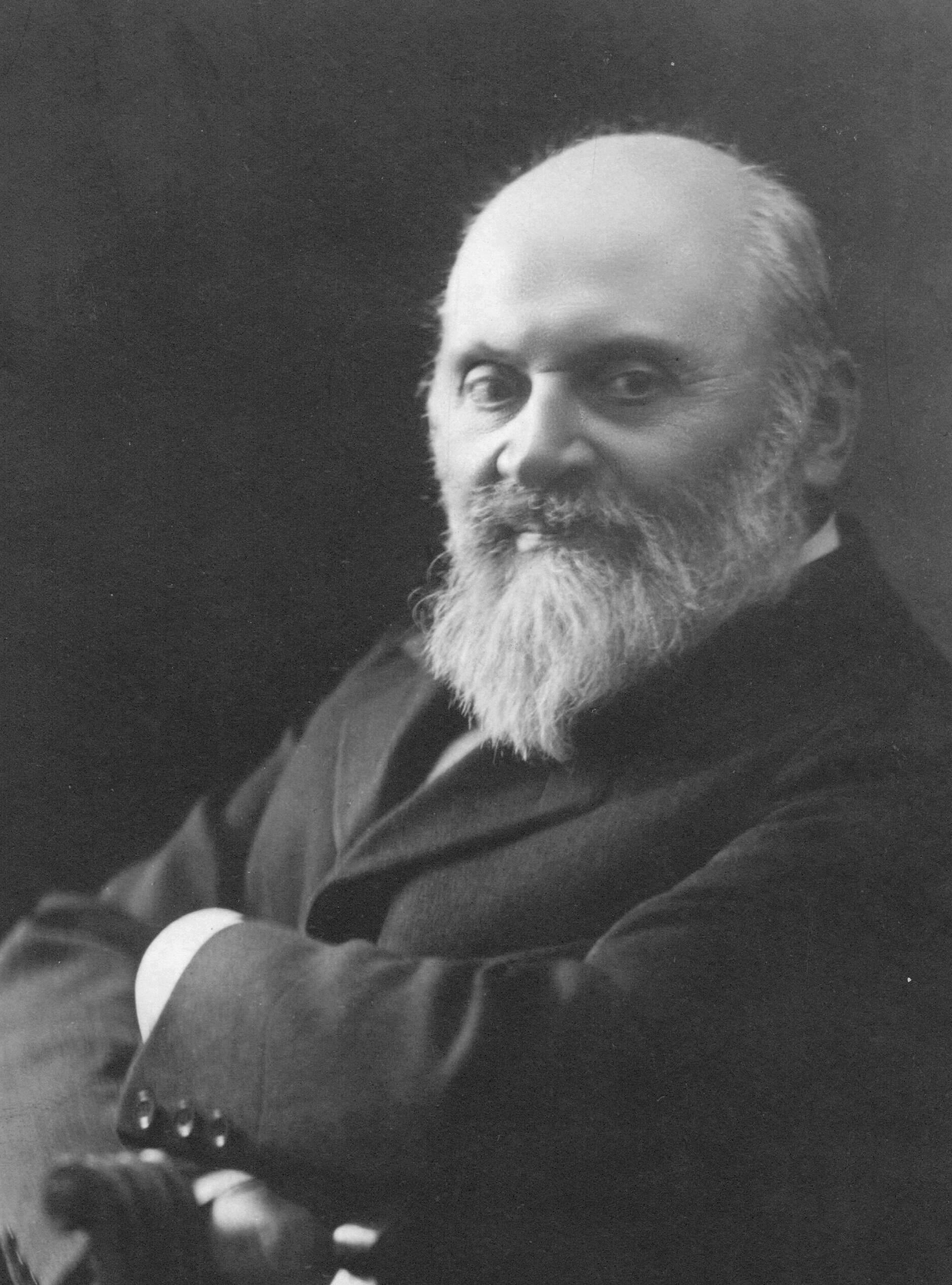
Balakirev in his later years

In the spring of 1871, rumors circulated that Balakirev had suffered a nervous breakdown. Friends who visited him found no trace of his former self; in place of his former vivacity, energy and drive, they found him silent, withdrawn and lethargic. Borodin wrote to Rimsky-Korsakov that he wondered whether Balakirev's condition was little better than insanity. He was especially concerned about Balakirev's coolness toward musical matters, and hoped he would not follow the example of author Nikolai Gogol and destroy his manuscripts. He took a five-year break from music, and withdrew from his musical friends, but did not destroy his manuscripts; instead he stacked them neatly in one corner of his house. In his mental state, he neglected to give up his post as director of the Free Music School, and the directors of the school were at a loss as to what to do. He finally resigned in 1874 and was replaced by Rimsky-Korsakov. Nikolai Rubinstein offered him a professorship at the Moscow Conservatory but he refused, stating that his musical knowledge was basically empirical (coming only or primarily from experience) and that he did not have enough knowledge of music theory to take on such a position. Financial distress forced Balakirev to become a railway clerk on the Warsaw railroad line in July 1872.

In 1876, Balakirev slowly began reemerging into the music world, but without the intensity of his former years. Stasov wrote Rimsky-Korsakov in July that Balakirev was busy composing his symphonic poem Tamara but still did not wish to see any of his old musical circle, "for there would be talks about music, which he would not have under any circumstances. Nevertheless, he inquires about everything with interest..." Balakirev also began sending individuals to Rimsky-Korsakov for private lessons in music theory. This paved the way for Rimsky-Korsakov to make occasional visits to Balakirev. By the autumn, these visits had become frequent. Also, Lyudmilla Shestarova asked him to edit Glinka's works for publication, in consort with Anatoly Lyadov and Rimsky-Korsakov.

In 1881, Balakirev was offered the directorship of the Moscow Conservatory, along with the conductorship of the Moscow branch of the Russian Musical Society. Perhaps keeping in mind his experience with the Saint Petersburg branch of the Russian Musical Society years earlier, he declined the position. Instead, he resumed the directorship of the Free School of Music. In 1882, he finished Tamara and revised his "symphonic picture" two years later, retitling it Rus. In 1883, he was appointed director of the Imperial Chapel; Rimsky-Korsakov eventually became his assistant. He held this post until 1895, when he took his final retirement and composed in earnest. Between 1895 and 1910 he completed two symphonies, a piano sonata and two movements of his Second Piano Concerto, along with republishing his collection of folk-song arrangements.

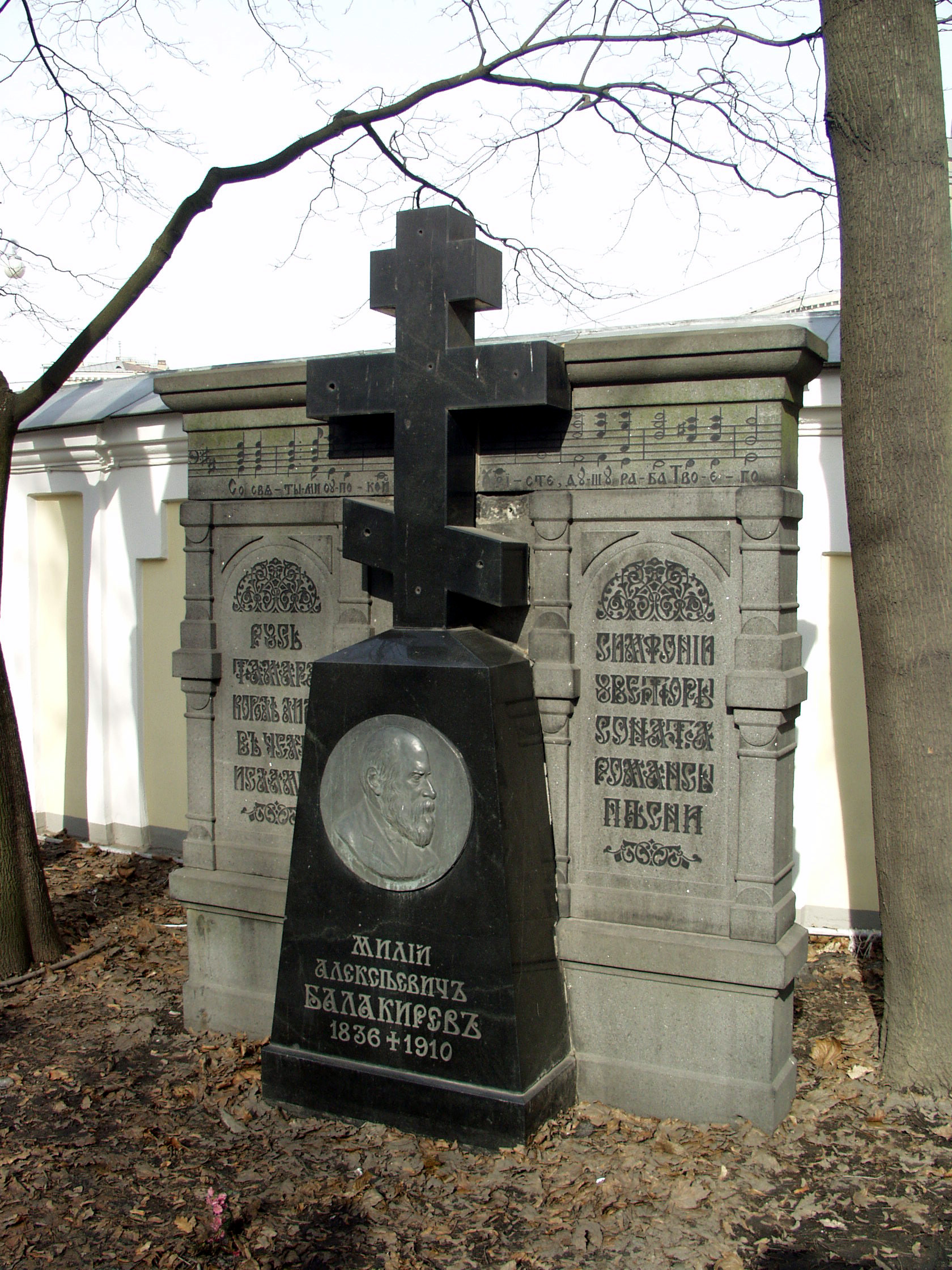
Balakirev's grave at Tikhvin Cemetery

While Balakirev resumed musical Tuesday gatherings at his home by the 1880s, it was music patron Mitrofan Belyayev who became a fixture of the Russian classical music scene at this time. Some composers, including Alexander Glazunov and Rimsky-Korsakov, initially attended these meetings. However, Balakirev's modest gatherings eventually proved no match for Belyayev's lavish Friday gatherings, nor could he compete with the commissions, prizes and performances that Belyayev offered. Balakirev did not take advantage of Belyayev's services in these areas, as he felt that they promoted inferior music, and lowered the quality of Russian music. Musicologist Richard Taruskin asserted that another reason Balakirev did not participate with the Belyayev circle was that he was not comfortable participating in a group at which he was not at its center. The exception to this was Balakirev's collection of folk songs, to which Belyayev bought the rights after the death of the songs' initial publisher. Otherwise, Balakirev remained without a publisher until 1899, when he met the Saint Petersburg music publisher J.H. Zimmermann. It was through Zimmermann's efforts that Balakirev prepared several works for publication, including his two symphonies.

Unlike his earlier days, when he played works in progress at gatherings of The Five, Balakirev composed in isolation. He was aware that younger composers now considered his compositional style old-fashioned. Except initially for Glazunov, whom he brought to Rimsky-Korsakov as a prodigy, and his later acolyte Sergei Lyapunov, Balakirev was ignored by the younger generation of Russian composers.

Balakirev died on 29 May 1910 and was interred in Tikhvin Cemetery at the Alexander Nevsky Monastery in Saint Petersburg.

== Personal life ==
Balakirev apparently never married nor had any children since none are mentioned in biographical sources. In his earlier days he was politically liberal, a freethinker and an atheist; for a while, he considered writing an opera based on Chernishevsky's nihilistic novel What is to Be Done?. For a while in the late 1860s he frequented a soothsayer to learn his fate with the Russian Musical Society. Rimsky-Korsakov wrote of these sessions, "Balakirev, who did not believe in God, became a believer in the Devil. The Devil brought it about that subsequently he came to believe in God too ... [T]he soothsaying ... cast a terror upon him".

Following his breakdown, Balakirev sought solace in the strictest sect of Russian Orthodoxy, dating his conversion to the anniversary of his mother's death in March 1871. The exact circumstances of that conversion are unknown, as no letters or diaries of his from this period have survived. Rimsky-Korsakov relates some of Balakirev's extremes in behavior at this point—how he had "given up eating meat, and ate fish, but ... only those which had died, never the killed variety"; how he would remove his hat and quickly cross himself whenever he passed by a church; and how his compassion for animals reached the point that whenever an insect was found in a room, he would carefully catch it and release it from a window, saying, "Go thee, deary, in the Lord, go!" Balakirev lived as a recluse in a house filled with dogs, cats and religious icons. The exception to this reclusiveness was the musical Tuesday evenings he held after his return to music in the 1870s and 80s. He also became a political reactionary and "xenophobic Slavophile who wrote hymns in honor of the dowager empress and other members of the royal family."

Rimsky-Korsakov mentions that some of Balakirev's character traits were present before his conversion but became intensified afterward. This was true of his general intolerance of viewpoints other than his own, but especially so with his anti-Semitism. His attacks on Anton Rubinstein in the 1860s became petty and anti-Semitic, and Jews were not admitted to the Free School during his earlier directorship. However, it was after his conversion that he suspected everyone he disliked to be of Jewish origin, and that he hated the Jews in general because they had crucified Christ. He became belligerent in his religious conversations with friends, insistent that they cross themselves and attend church with him. "All this medley of Christian meekness, backbiting, fondness for beasts, misanthropy, artistic interests, and a triviality worthy of an old maid from a hospice, all these struck everyone who saw him in those days", Rimsky-Korsakov wrote, adding that these traits intensified further in subsequent years.

== Music ==
Mily Balakirev at the time he taught "The Five."

Balakirev became important in the history of Russian music through both his works and his leadership. More so than Glinka, he helped set the course for Russian orchestral music and Russian lyrical song during the second half of the 19th century. While he learned from Glinka certain methods of treating Russian folk song instrumentally, a bright, transparent orchestral technique (something he also learned from the works of Hector Berlioz) and many elements of his basic style, he developed and expanded upon what he had learned, fusing it satisfactorily with then-advanced Romantic compositional techniques.

Unfortunately, the protracted composition of several works robbed Balakirev of the credit for their inventiveness. Pieces which could have won success had they been completed in the 1860s and 70s made a much smaller impact when they were introduced much later in the composer's life. This was because they had been overtaken stylistically by the accomplishments of younger composers, and because some of their compositional devices were appropriated by other members of The Five—the most notable example of the latter is Rimsky-Korsakov's Scheherazade, which was influenced by Balakirev's symphonic poem Tamara. Another consequence was a tendency to overwork details, which robbed these pieces of freshness and inspiration, making them seem "overdone".

Despite the protracted composition period, there was no discernible difference, especially in the two symphonies, between the sections completed in the 1860s and those written much later. Zetlin asserts that while there was no diminution of Balakirev's creative talent, the reason for this lack of disparity was because Balakirev "had ceased to evolve" as an artist; he remained creatively at the point he had reached in the 1860s, "and his newest works seemed thus merely an echo of the past."

=== Influences ===
Perhaps because Balakirev's initial musical experience was as a pianist, composers for his own instrument influenced the repertory and style of his compositions. He wrote in all the genres cultivated by Frédéric Chopin except the Ballade, cultivating a comparable charm. The other keyboard composer who influenced Balakirev was Franz Liszt, apparent in Islamey as well as in his transcriptions of works by other composers and the symphonic poem Tamara.

Balakirev's affinity with Glinka's music becomes most apparent in his handling of folk material. However, Balakirev advances on Glinka's technique of using "variations with changing backgrounds," reconciling the compositional practices of classical music with the idiomatic treatment of folk song, employing motivic fragmentation, counterpoint and a structure exploiting key relationships.

Between his two Overtures on Russian Themes, Balakirev became involved with folk song collecting and arranging. This work alerted him to the frequency of the Dorian mode, the tendency for many melodies to swing between the major key and its relative minor on its flat seventh key, and the tendency to accentuate notes not consistent with dominant harmony. These characteristics were reflected in Balakirev's handling of Russian folk song.

Since the musical views of The Five tended to be anti-German, it is easy to forget that Balakirev was actually well-grounded in German symphonic style—all the more impressive when it is remembered that Balakirev was essentially self-taught as a composer. His King Lear overture, written when he was 22, is not a symphonic poem in the vein of Liszt but actually more along the lines of Beethoven's concert overtures, relying more on the dramatic qualities of sonata form than on extramusical content.

=== Russian style: The Overtures ===
With his First Overture on Russian Themes, Balakirev focused on writing symphonic works with Russian character. He chose his themes from folk song collections available at the time he composed the piece, taking Glinka's Kamarinskaya as a model in taking a slow song for the introduction, then for the fast section choosing two songs compatible in structure with the ostinato pattern of the Kamarinskaya dance song. Balakirev's use of two songs in this section was an important departure from the model, as it allowed him to link the symphonic process of symphonic form with Glinka's variations on an ostinato pattern, and in contrasting them treat the songs symphonically instead of merely decoratively.

The Second Overture on Russian Themes shows an increased sophistication as Balakirev utilizes Beethoven's technique of deriving short motifs from longer themes so that those motifs can be combined into a convincing contrapuntal fabric. As such it can stand on its own as an example of abstract motivic-thematic composition, yet since it uses folk songs in doing so, it can also be looked upon as making a statement about nationality. In this overture he shows how folk songs could be given symphonic dimensions while paying particular attention to the element of protyazhnaya or melismatically elaborated lyric song. This type of song is characterized by extreme rhythmic flexibility, asymmetrical phrase structure and tonal ambiguity. Incorporating these elements meant employing the tonal instability of folk song in larger structures by relying on tonal indeterminacy. The structure of this overture departs from the classic tonal relationships of tonic and dominant, coming close to the tonal experiments of Liszt and Robert Schumann.

Like his contemporaries in The Five, Balakirev believed in the importance of program music—music written to fulfill a program inspired by a portrait, poem, story or other non-musical source. Unlike his compatriots, the musical form always came first for Balakirev, not the extramusical source, and his technique continued to reflect the Germanic symphonic approach. Nevertheless, Balakirev's overtures played a crucial role in the emergence of Russian symphonic music in that they introduced the musical style now considered "Russian." His style was adapted by his compatriots and others to the point of becoming a national characteristic. The opening of Mussorgsky's Boris Godunov bears a close resemblance to the first theme of Balakirev's Second Overture, while Borodin's In the Steppes of Central Asia begins with a dominant pedal extending over 90 bars in the upper register of the violins, a device Balakirev used in his First Overture. The opening of Tchaikovsky's Little Russian Symphony in its original form also shows Balakirev's influence.

=== Progressive development: First Symphony ===
Balakirev began his First Symphony after completing the Second Overture but cut work short to concentrate on the Overture on Czech Themes, recommencing on the symphony only 30 years later and not finishing it until 1897. Letters from Balakirev to Stasov and Cui indicate that the first movement was two-thirds completed and the final movement sketched out, though he would supply a new theme for the finale many years later. While he was waiting until the finale to incorporate folk material, he was anxious to incorporate a new Russian element, somewhat religious in nature, into the opening movement. The symphonic design for this movement is highly unusual. The slow introduction announces the motif on which the allegro vivo is based. While the allegro vivo is a three part structure, it differs from sonata form in having an exposition, a second exposition and a development instead of the usual order of exposition-development-recapitulation. This means that after the actual exposition, the thematic material is developed in two places, with the second exposition actually being an elaboration of the first. Formally, the process is one of progressive development, divided into three stages of increasing complexity. If this was how Balakirev had actually planned the movement in 1864, it would predate the late symphonies of Jean Sibelius in utilizing this compositional principle.

=== Orientalism: Tamara ===
Balakirev also further cultivated the orientalism of Glinka's opera Ruslan and Lyudmila, making it a more consistent style. It appears in the Georgian Song of 1861, Islamey and Tamara. This style comprises two parts: a languorous vein of slow, sinuous melody with ornamentation and slow-moving harmonic progressions, contrasted with a more ecstatic vein marked by a perpetuum mobile at a fast tempo and rapid melodic contours over a slower-moving harmonic changes. This style on one hand evoked the mystery of the distant, exotic east with which Russia did not have direct contact, and on the other hand could also be used to refer to recently colonized areas of the Russian Empire.

Tamara is considered by some to be Balakirev's greatest work as well as a touchstone of orientalism. Originally he intended to write a lezginka modeled after Glinka. However, he was inspired by the poetry of Mikhail Lermontov about the seductress Tamara, who waylays travelers in her tower at the Darial Gorge and allows them to savor a night of sensual delights before killing them and flinging their bodies into the Terek River. Balakirev evokes both the poem's setting of the mountains and gorges of the Caucasus and the angelic and demonically seductive power of the title character. The narrative employs a wide musical range, with the composer supplying great subtlety within a satisfying structure.

== Media ==
Chopin Suite, Op. 11 – Mazurka
Performed by
Singapore Symphony Orchestra
Hoey Choo (Conductor)
Courtesy of NAXOS

Islamey
MIDI performance by Bernd Krueger

== Sources ==
- Abraham, Gerald, "Balakirev, Mily Alexeyevich". In The New Grove Encyclopedia of Music and Musicians (London: Macmillan, 1980), ed. Stanley Sadie, 20 vols. ISBN 0-333-23111-2.
- Brown, David, Tchaikovsky: The Early Years, 1840–1874 (New York: W.W. Norton & Company, 1978). ISBN 0-393-07535-2.
- Campbell, Stuart, "Balakirev, Mily Alekseyevich". In The New Grove Encyclopedia of Music and Musicians, Second Edition (London: Macmillan, 2001), ed. Stanley Sadie, 29 vols. ISBN 0-333-60800-3.
- Figes, Orlando, Natasha's Dance: A Cultural History of Russia (New York: Metropolitan Books, 2002). ISBN 0-8050-5783-8 (hc.).
- Holden, Anthony, Tchaikovsky: A Biography (New York: Random House, 1995). ISBN 0-679-42006-1.
- Maes, Francis, tr. Arnold J. Pomerans and Erica Pomerans, A History of Russian Music: From Kamarinskaya to Babi Yar (Berkeley, Los Angeles and London: University of California Press, 2002). ISBN 0-520-21815-9.
- Rimsky-Korsakov, Nikolai, Letoppis Moyey Muzykalnoy Zhizni (Saint Petersburg, 1909), published in English as My Musical Life (New York: Knopf, 1925, 3rd ed. 1942). ISBN n/a.
- Taruskin, Richard, Stravinsky and the Russian Traditions: A Biography of the Works Through Mavra, Volume 1 (Oxford and New York: Oxford University Press, 1996). ISBN 0-19-816250-2.
- Zetlin, Mikhail, tr. and ed. George Panin, The Five (Westport, Connecticut: Greenwood Press, 1959, 1975). ISBN 0-8371-6797-3.
