= Pyotr Ilyich Tchaikovsky and the Belyayev circle =

Tchaikovsky's relations with a group of composers

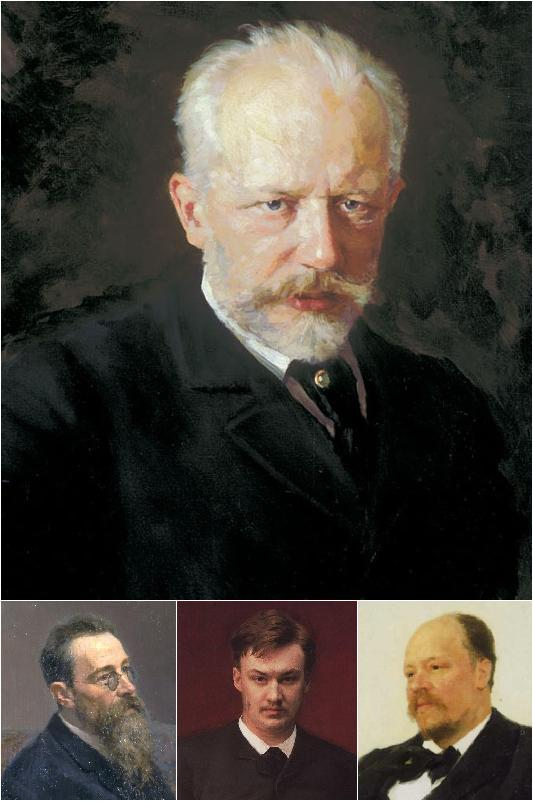
Top: Pyotr Ilyich Tchaikovsky. Bottom (left to right): Nikolai Rimsky-Korsakov, Alexander Glazunov and Anatoly Lyadov

Pyotr Ilyich Tchaikovsky's relations with the group of composers known as the Belyayev circle, which lasted from 1887 until Tchaikovsky's death in 1893, influenced all of their music and briefly helped shape the next generation of Russian composers. This group was named after timber merchant Mitrofan Belyayev, an amateur musician who became an influential music patron and publisher after he had taken an interest in Alexander Glazunov's work. By 1887, Tchaikovsky was firmly established as one of the leading composers in Russia. A favorite of Tsar Alexander III, he was widely regarded as a national treasure. He was in demand as a guest conductor in Russia and Western Europe, and in 1890 visited the United States in the same capacity. By contrast, the fortunes of the nationalistic group of composers known as The Five, which preceded the Belyayev circle, had waned, and the group had long since dispersed; of its members, only Nikolai Rimsky-Korsakov remained fully active as a composer. Now a professor of musical composition and orchestration at the Saint Petersburg Conservatory, Rimsky-Korsakov had become a firm believer in the Western-based compositional training that had been once frowned upon by the group.

As a result of the time Tchaikovsky spent with the Belyayev circle's leading composers—Glazunov, Anatoly Lyadov and Rimsky-Korsakov—the somewhat fraught relationship he had previously endured with The Five would eventually meld into something more harmonious. Tchaikovsky's friendship with these men gave him increased confidence in his own abilities as a composer, while his music encouraged Glazunov to broaden his artistic outlook past the nationalist agenda and to compose along more universal themes. This influence grew to the point that Glazunov's Third Symphony became known as the "anti-kuchist" symphony of his oeuvre ("kuchist" refers to "kuchka", the shortened Russian name for The Five) and shared several stylistic fingerprints with Tchaikovsky's later symphonies. Nor was Glazunov the only composer so influenced. Rimsky-Korsakov wrote about the Belyayev composers' "worship of Tchaikovsky and ... tendency toward eclecticism" that became prevalent during this period, along with a predilection toward "Italian-French music of the time of wig and farthingale" (that is, of the 18th Century) typified in Tchaikovsky's late operas The Queen of Spades and Iolanta.

Over the long term, Tchaikovsky's influence over the Belyayev composers was not as great. Though they remained more eclectic in their musical approach and focused more on absolute music than The Five had done, they continued writing overall in a style more akin to Rimsky-Korsakov than to Tchaikovsky. Even Glazunov backed away from echoing Tchaikovsky strongly in his mature work, instead amalgamating nationalistic and cosmopolitan styles in an eclectic approach. The Belyayev composers also spread the nationalist musical aesthetic to Russia as a whole and were themselves an influence on composers well into the Soviet era.

== Tchaikovsky and Rimsky-Korsakov ==
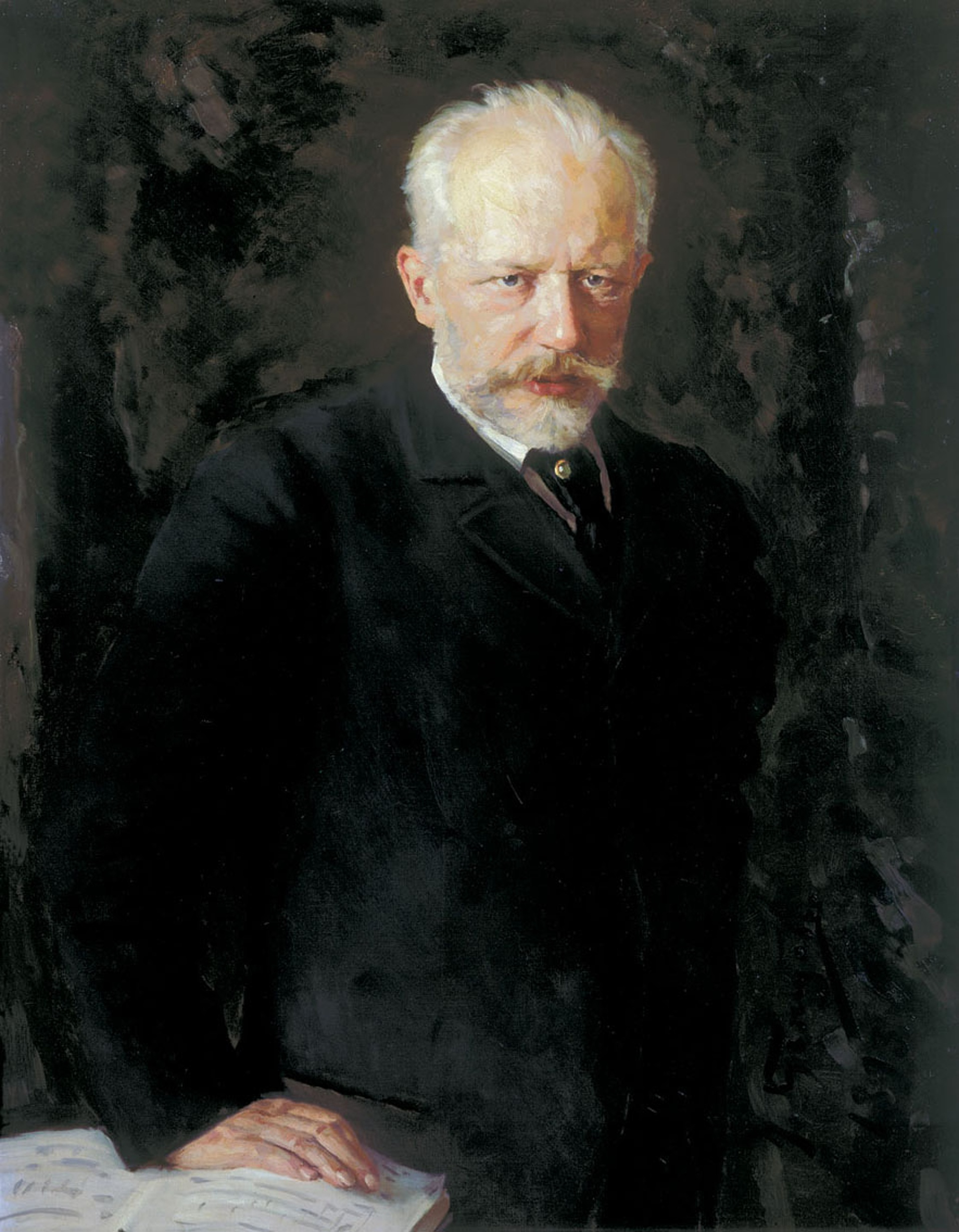
Pyotr Ilyich Tchaikovsky by Nikolay Kuznetsov, 1893

During 1884, the 44-year-old Tchaikovsky began to shed the unsociability and restlessness that had plagued him since his abortive marriage in 1878, and which had caused him to travel incessantly throughout Russia and Western Europe. In March 1884, Tsar Alexander III conferred upon him the Order of St. Vladimir (fourth class), which carried with it hereditary nobility, and won Tchaikovsky a personal audience with the Tsar. The Tsar's decoration was a visible seal of official approval, which helped Tchaikovsky's rehabilitation from the stigma associated with the conditions of his marriage. This rehabilitation may have been cemented in the composer's mind with the success of his Third Orchestral Suite at its January 1885 premiere in St. Petersburg, under Hans von Bülow's direction. Tchaikovsky wrote to his patroness Nadezhda von Meck: "I have never seen such a triumph. I saw the whole audience was moved, and grateful to me. These moments are the finest adornments of an artist's life. Thanks to these it is worth living and laboring." The press was likewise unanimously favorable.

While he still felt a disdain for public life, Tchaikovsky now participated in it for two reasons—his increasing celebrity, and what he felt was his duty to promote Russian music. To this end, he helped support his former pupil Sergei Taneyev, now director of the Moscow Conservatory, by attending student examinations and negotiating the sometimes sensitive relations among various members of the staff. Tchaikovsky also served as director of the Moscow branch of the Russian Musical Society during the 1889–90 season. In this post, he invited a number of international celebrities to conduct, including Johannes Brahms, Antonín Dvořák and Jules Massenet. Tchaikovsky promoted Russian music both in his own compositions and in his role as a guest conductor. In January 1887 he substituted at the Bolshoi Theater in Moscow on short notice for the first three performances of his opera Cherevichki. Conducting was something the composer had wanted to master for at least a decade, as he saw that success outside Russia depended to some extent on conducting his own works. Within a year of the Cherevichki performances, Tchaikovsky was in considerable demand throughout Europe and Russia, which helped him overcome a life-long stage fright and boosted his self-assurance.

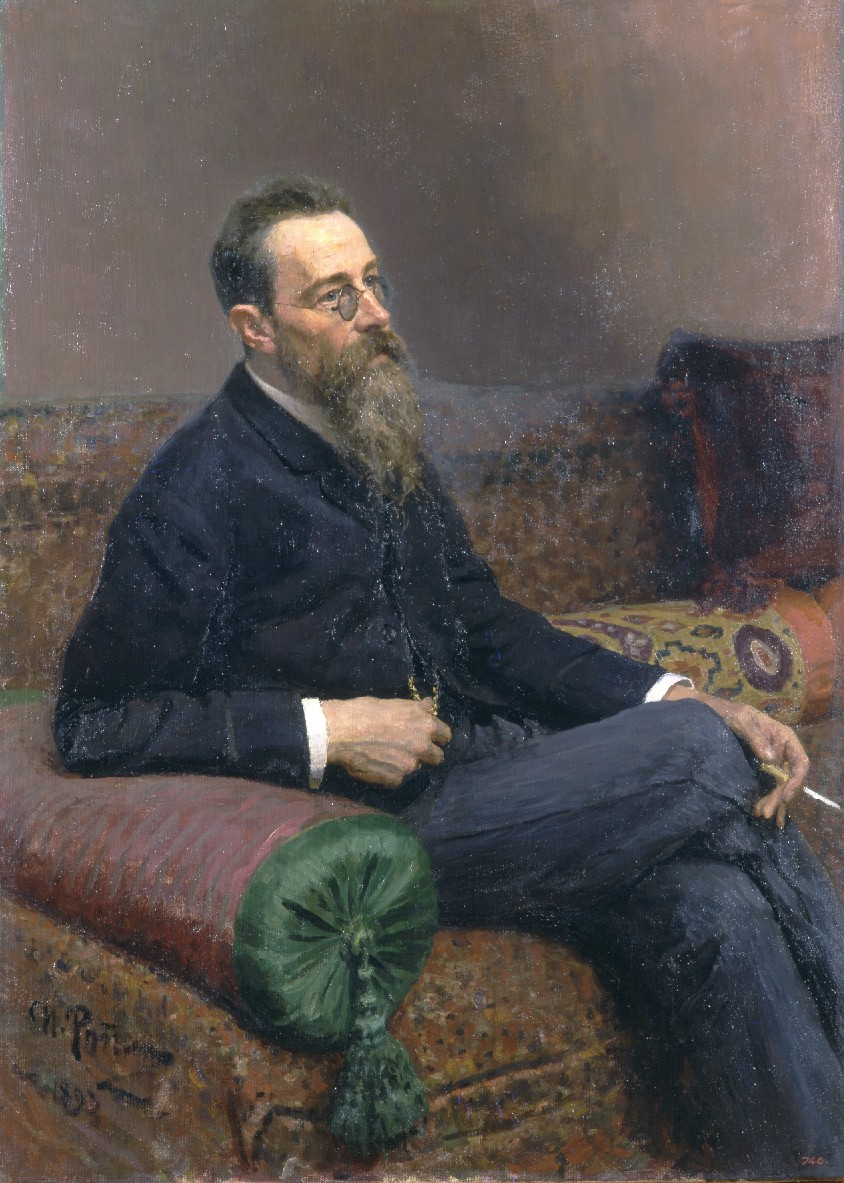
Portrait of Rimsky-Korsakov by Ilya Repin

Tchaikovsky's relationship with Rimsky-Korsakov had gone through changes by the time he visited St. Petersburg in November 1887. As a member of The Five, Rimsky-Korsakov had been essentially self-educated as a composer. He regarded Tchaikovsky with suspicion since he possessed an academic background and did not agree with the musical philosophy espoused by The Five. However, when Rimsky-Korsakov was appointed to a professorship at the Saint Petersburg Conservatory in 1871, he recognized that he was ill-prepared to take on such a task. He had also reached a compositional impasse, and realized he was essentially on a creative path leading nowhere. He sent a letter to Tchaikovsky in which he outlined his situation and asked what he ought to do. The letter "deeply touched and amazed" Tchaikovsky with its poignancy. As Tchaikovsky later relayed to Nadezhda von Meck, "Of course he had to study".

Between 1871 and 1874, while he lectured at the Conservatory, Rimsky-Korsakov thoroughly grounded himself in Western compositional techniques, and came to believe in the value of academic training for success as a composer. Once Rimsky-Korsakov had made this turn-around, Tchaikovsky considered him an esteemed colleague, and, if not the best of friends, was at least on friendly terms with him. When the other members of The Five became hostile toward Rimsky-Korsakov for his change of attitude, Tchaikovsky continued to support Rimsky-Korsakov morally, telling him that he fully applauded what Rimsky-Korsakov was doing, and admired both his artistic modesty and his strength of character. Beginning in 1876, Tchaikovsky was a regular visitor to the Rimsky-Korsakov home during his trips to Saint Petersburg. At one point, Tchaikovsky offered to have Rimsky-Korsakov appointed to the directorship of the Moscow Conservatory, but he refused.

Tchaikovsky's admiration extended to Rimsky-Korsakov's compositions. He wrote Rimsky-Korsakov that he considered Capriccio Espagnol "a colossal masterpiece of instrumentation" and called him "the greatest master of the present day". In his diary, Tchaikovsky confided, "Read [Rimsky-]Korsakov's Snow Maiden and marveled at his mastery and was even (ashamed to admit) envious".

== Glazunov ==
Tchaikovsky was impressed with not only Rimsky-Korsakov's achievements but also those of the teenage Glazunov. A child prodigy, Glazunov had begun piano studies at the age of nine and to compose at the age of 11. At the age of 13, in 1879, he met Balakirev, who recommended Rimsky-Korsakov as a private tutor in musical composition, counterpoint and orchestration, and brought Rimsky-Korsakov an orchestral score Glazunov had written. "The boy's talent was indubitably clear", Rimsky-Korsakov remembered. Glazunov studied with Rimsky-Korsakov for a little less than two years, during which time he progressed, in Rimsky-Korsakov's words, "not by the day, but literally by the hour". He also continued to receive advice from Balakirev. At 16, he completed his First Symphony, which was successfully premiered under Balakirev's direction on March 29, 1882. Present at this performance was Mitrofan Belyayev, a lumber baron and amateur musician who would take the young composer under his wing, and composer Sergei Taneyev, who was a close friend of Tchaikovsky. Glazunov would eventually become a professor at the Saint Petersburg Conservatory, and later its director.

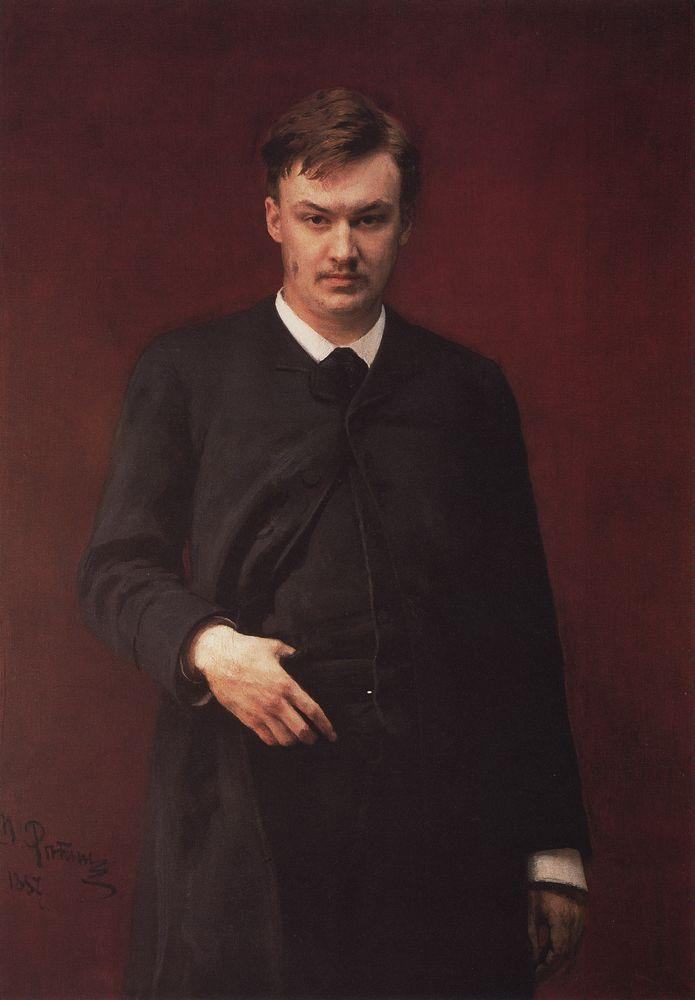
Portrait of Alexander Glazunov by Ilya Repin, 1887.

Tchaikovsky began showing a keen interest in Glazunov shortly after hearing about the premiere of Glazunov's First Symphony from Taneyev. At that time, Tchaikovsky wrote Balakirev, "Glazunov interests me greatly. Is there any chance that this young man could send me the symphony so that I might take a look at it? I should also like to know whether he completed it, either conceptually or practically, with your or Rimsky-Korsakov's help." Balakirev replied, "You ask about Glazunov. He is a very talented young man who studied for a year under Rimsky-Korsakov. When he composed his symphony, he did not need any help." Tchaikovsky studied the score for Glazunov's First String Quartet, and wrote his brother Modest, "Despite its imitation of [Rimsky-]Korsakov ... a remarkable talent is discernible." Glazunov later sent Tchaikovsky a copy of his Poème lyrique for orchestra, about which Tchaikovsky had written enthusiastically to Balakirev, and had recommended for publication to his publisher P. Jurgenson.

According to critic Vladimir Stasov, Glazunov and Tchaikovsky first met in October 1884 at a gathering hosted by Balakirev. Glazunov was then 19 years old. Tchaikovsky was in Saint Petersburg because his opera Eugene Onegin was being performed at the Mariinsky Theater. Glazunov later wrote that while the nationalists' circle "was no longer so ideologically closed and isolated as it had been earlier", they "did not consider P.I. Tchaikovsky one of our own. We valued only a few of his works, like Romeo and Juliet, The Tempest, Francesca [da Rimini] and the finale of the Second Symphony. The rest of his output was either unknown or alien to us". Tchaikovsky's presence won over Glazunov and the other young members present, and his conversation with them "was a fresh breeze amid our somewhat dusty atmosphere ... Many of the young musicians present, including Lyadov and myself, left Balakirev's apartment charmed by Tchaikovsky's personality. ... As Lyadov put it, our acquaintance with the great composer was a real occasion."

Glazunov adds that his relationship with Tchaikovsky changed from the elder composer being "not ... one of our own" to a close friendship that would last until Tchaikovsky's death. "I met Tchaikovsky quite often both at Balakirev's and at my own home", Glazunov remembered. "We usually met over music. He always appeared in our social circle as one of the most welcome guests; besides myself and Lyadov, Rimsky-Korsakov and Balakirev were also constant members of our circle." This circle, with which Tchaikovsky would spend an increasing amount of time in the last couple of years of his life, would come to be known as the Belyayev circle, named after its patron, Belyayev. According to musicologist Richard Taruskin, Belyayev, through his financial influence, would shape Russian music more greatly and lastingly than either Balakirev or Stasov were able to do.

== Belyayev and his circle ==
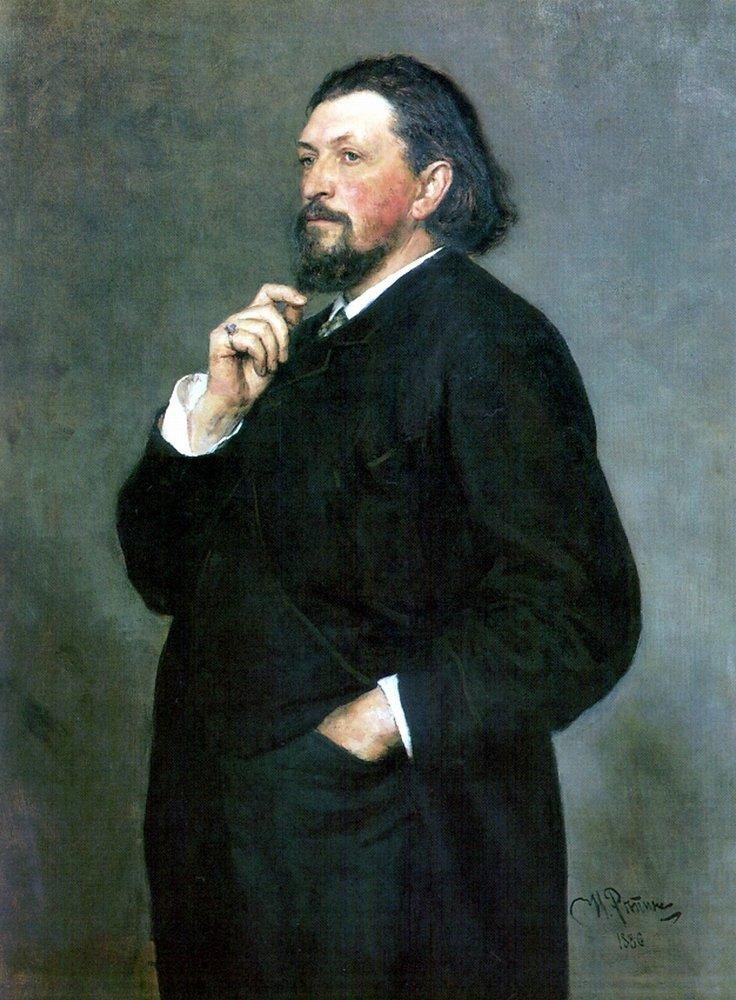
Portrait of Mitrofan Belyayev by Ilya Repin

Belyayev was one of a growing number of Russian nouveau-riche industrialists who became patrons of the arts in mid- to late-19th-century Russia; their number included Nadezhda von Meck, railway magnate Savva Mamontov and textile manufacturer Pavel Tretyakov. While Nadezhda von Meck insisted on anonymity in her patronage in the tradition of noblesse oblige, Belyayev, Mamontov and Tretyakov "wanted to contribute conspicuously to public life". They had worked their way up into wealth, and being Slavophilic in their national outlook believed in the greater glory of Russia. Because of this belief, they were more likely than the aristocracy to support native talent, and were more inclined to support nationalist artists over cosmopolitan ones. This preference was not due to any social agenda inherent in the art, but due to "its sympathetic and skillful portrayal of peculiar aspects of landscape, of daily life, and of character types with which they were familiar and which they lived", and it paralleled a general upsurge in nationalism and Russophilia that became prevalent in mainstream Russian art and society.

An amateur viola player and chamber music enthusiast, Belyayev hosted "quartet Fridays" at his home in Saint Petersburg. A frequent visitor to these gatherings was Rimsky-Korsakov, who had met Belyayev in Moscow in 1882. Belyayev became a music patron after he had heard the Glazunov's First Symphony. Not only did Glazunov become a fixture at the "quartet Fridays", but Belyayev also published Glazunov's work and took him on a tour of Western Europe. This tour included a visit to Weimar, Germany, to present the young composer to Franz Liszt, and where Glazunov's First Symphony was performed.

Soon Belyayev became interested in other Russian composers. In 1884 he set up an annual Glinka Prize, named after pioneer Russian composer Mikhail Glinka (1804–1857). In 1885, disgusted with the quality of music publishing in Russia and the lack of foreign copyright for works printed there, he founded his own publishing firm in Leipzig, Germany. This firm initially issued works by Glazunov, Rimsky-Korsakov, Lyadov and Borodin at its own expense, and would boast a catalog of over 2000 works, all written by Russian composers, by the time of the October Revolution in 1917. At Rimsky-Korsakov's suggestion, Belyayev also founded his own concert series, the Russian Symphony Concerts, open exclusively to Russian composers. Among the works written especially for this series were the three by Rimsky-Korsakov for which he is currently best known in the West—Scheherazade, the Russian Easter Festival Overture and Capriccio Espagnol. These concerts would last until the October Revolution, and by 1910 would host premieres of 165 works. Belyayev set up an advisory council, made up of Glazunov, Lyadov and Rimsky-Korsakov, to select which among the many composers appealing for help should be assisted, either through money, publication or performances. This council would look through the compositions and appeals submitted and suggest which were deserving of patronage and public attention. Though the three worked together, Rimsky-Korsakov became the de facto leader of the group. "By force of matters purely musical I turned out to be the head of the Belyayev circle", he wrote. "As the head Belyayev, too, considered me, consulting me about everything and referring everyone to me as chief."

The group of composers who now congregated with Glazunov, Lyadov and Rimsky-Korsakov were nationalistic in their outlook, as the Five before them had been. Like The Five, they believed in a uniquely Russian style of classical music that utilized folk music and exotic melodic, harmonic and rhythmic elements, as exemplified by the music of Balakirev, Borodin and Rimsky-Korsakov. Unlike The Five, these composers also believed in the necessity of an academic, Western-based background in composition. The necessity of Western compositional techniques was something that Rimsky-Korsakov had instilled in many of them in his years at the Saint Petersburg Conservatory. Compared to the "revolutionary" composers in Balakirev's circle, Rimsky-Korsakov found those in the Belyayev circle to be "progressive ... attaching as it did great importance to technical perfection, but ... also broke new paths, though more securely, even if less speedily. ..."

== Visits in 1887 ==
In November 1887, Tchaikovsky arrived in Saint Petersburg in time to hear several of the Russian Symphony Concerts. One of these concerts included the first complete performance of his First Symphony, subtitled Winter Daydreams, in its final version. Another concert featured the premiere of Rimsky-Korsakov's Third Symphony in its revised version. Before this trip, Tchaikovsky had spent considerable time corresponding with Rimsky-Korsakov, Glazunov and Lyadov, and during his visit, he spent much time in the company of these men.

Nine years earlier, Tchaikovsky had penned a ruthless dissection of The Five for Nadezhda von Meck. At that time, his feelings of personal isolation and professional insecurity had been at their strongest. In the nine intervening years, Mussorgsky and Borodin had both died, Balakirev had banished himself to the musical sidelines, and Cui's critical missives had lost much of their sting for Tchaikovsky. Rimsky-Korsakov was the only one left who was fully active as a composer, and much had changed in the intervening years between him and Tchaikovsky as a result of Rimsky-Korsakov's change in musical values. Tchaikovsky had also changed. More secure as a composer and less isolated personally than he had been in the past, Tchaikovsky enjoyed the company he now kept with Glazunov, Lyadov and Rimsky-Korsakov, and found much to enjoy in their music.

Tchaikovsky admired several of the pieces he heard during these concerts, including Rimsky-Korsakov's symphony and Glazunov's Second Overture on Greek Themes. He promised both Glazunov and Rimsky-Korsakov that he would secure performances of their works in concerts in Moscow. When these arrangements did not arise as planned, Tchaikovsky made urgent covert attempts to make good on his promises, especially to Rimsky-Korsakov, whom he now called "an outstanding figure ... worthy of every respect".

In December 1887, on the eve of his departure to tour as a guest conductor through Western Europe, Tchaikovsky stopped in Saint Petersburg and consulted with Glazunov, Lyadov and Rimsky-Korsakov on a detailed program of Russian music that he might lead in Paris. Though this opportunity did not arise, it shows his openness to promoting works by the Belyayev circle as his duty to promote Russian music.

== Lyadov ==
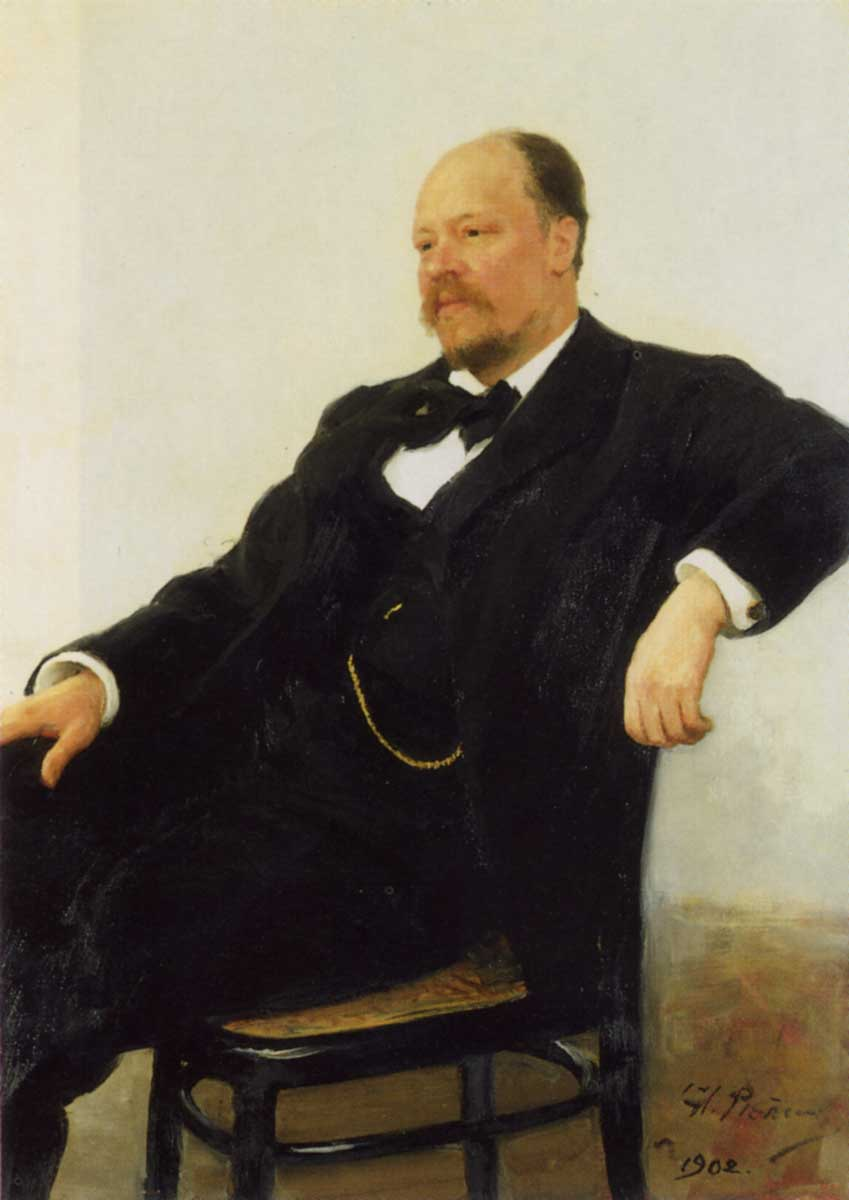
Anatoly Lyadov as portrayed by Ilya Repin

Though they had previously corresponded, Tchaikovsky made the personal acquaintance of another Rimsky-Korsakov pupil, Lyadov, during his November 1887 visit. Lyadov had the dubious distinction of being expelled from the Saint Petersburg Conservatory for cutting classes—a move on the part of the Conservatory that Rimsky-Korsakov had upheld. Lyadov was eventually readmitted, and became friends with Rimsky-Korsakov. He also assisted Rimsky-Korsakov and Balakirev in editing the orchestral scores of Borodin, and Rimsky-Korsakov and Alexander Borodin on scoring the "Polovtsian Dances" from Borodin's opera Prince Igor in 1878. Like Rimsky-Korsakov and Glazunov, Lyadov would become a professor at the Saint Petersburg Conservatory and a leading member of the Belyayev circle. Lyadov never totally shed his penchant for indolence and procrastination, and this would cost him the commission for the ballet The Firebird from impresario Sergei Diaghilev; the commission would go to the young Igor Stravinsky.

Rimsky-Korsakov noted Lyadov's talent, as did Mussorgsky, who described Lyadov to Stasov in 1873 as "a new, unmistakable, original and Russian young talent". Tchaikovsky, however, had been unimpressed. In 1882, the publisher Besel asked Tchaikovsky's opinion about an Arabesque for solo piano that Lyadov had written. Tchaikovsky replied, "It is impossible to envisage any thing more vapid in content than this composer's music. He has many interesting chords and harmonic sequences, but not a single idea, even of the tiniest sort."

Before meeting Lyadov personally, Tchaikovsky may have been softening this stance. He decided to present the young composer a copy of the score of his Manfred Symphony, and once he had actually met the person whom Tchaikovsky authority David Brown called "indolent, fastidious, very private yet very engaging", his attitude toward Lyadov took a sharp turn for the better. The younger composer became known as "dear Lyadov".

== New confidence and advocacy ==
Two concerts Tchaikovsky heard in Saint Petersburg in January 1889, where his music shared the programs with compositions by the New Russian School (as the Belyayev circle was also called), proved a major watershed. Tchaikovsky recognized that while he had maintained good personal relations with some members of the Balakirev circle, and perhaps some respect, he had never been recognized as one of them. Now with his joint participation in these concerts, he realized he was no longer excluded. He wrote to Nadezhda von Meck that while he found Cui to be "an individual deeply hateful to me ... this in no way hinders me from respecting or loving such representatives of the school as Balakirev, Rimsky-Korsakov, Lyadov, Glazunov, or from considering myself flattered to appear on the concert platform beside them". This confession showed a wholehearted willingness for Tchaikovsky to have his music heard alongside that of the nationalists.

In giving this opinion, Tchaikovsky showed an implicit confidence in his own music, and the realization that it compared favorably to any number of their compositions. He had nothing to fear from whatever comparisons might result. Nor did he confine his views to private consumption. Tchaikovsky openly supported the musical efforts of Glazunov, Lyadov and Rimsky-Korsakov, despite a widely held view that they were musical enemies. In an interview printed in the weekly newspaper Saint Petersburg Life (Peterburgskaia zhizn') in November 1892, he said,

According to the view that is widespread among the Russian music public, I am associated with the party that is antagonistic to the one living Russian composer I love and value above all others—Nikolai Rimsky-Korsakov. ... In a word, despite our different musical identities, it would seem we are following a single path; and I, for my part, am proud to have such a fellow traveler. ... Lyadov and Glazunov are also numbered among my opponents, yet I sincerely love and value their talent.

With this new-found confidence came increased contact between Tchaikovsky and the Belyayev circle. Rimsky-Korsakov wrote, "In the winter of spring of 1891 [actually 1890] Tchaikovsky came to Saint Petersburg on quite a long visit, and from then dated his closer intimacy with Belyayev's circle, particularly with Glazunov, Lyadov, and me. In the years following, Tchaikovsky's visits became quite frequent."

== Increased acceptance by the Belyayev circle ==
Glazunov and Lyadov were friendly with Tchaikovsky and were charmed by him. Glazunov studied Tchaikovsky's works and "found much that was new ... that was instructive for us as young musicians. It struck me that Tchaikovsky, who was above all a lyrical and melodic composer, had introduced operatic elements into his symphonies. I admired the thematic material of his works less than the inspired unfolding of his thoughts, his temperament and the constructural perfection."

Taruskin writes, "A sense of what Tchaikovsky meant to Glazunov may be gained by comparing the latter's Second Symphony, on which he was working at the time of Tchaikovsky's visit ... and the Third, which he completed after a long gestation in 1890—and which he dedicated to Tchaikovsky." Taruskin calls the Second Symphony "a veritable summa of latterday kuchkism", with a number of stylistic fingerprints taken from Balakirev, Borodin and Rimsky-Korsakov. With the Third Symphony, Glazunov attempted to reach beyond the nationalist style to reflect what he felt were universal forms, moods and themes. Tchaikovsky's influence is clear in the work's lyrical episodes, in its themes and key relations, reminiscent of Tchaikovsky's Fourth and Fifth Symphonies, and in its orchestration, full of "dark doublings" and subtle instrumental effects hearkening to Tchaikovsky's style.

Glazunov was not the only composer among the Belyayev circle influenced by Tchaikovsky's music. Rimsky-Korsakov wrote in his memoirs that "a worship of Tchaikovsky and a tendency toward eclecticism" grew stronger among many of the Belyayev composers at this time, along with "a predilection ... for Italian-French music of the time of wig and farthingale [that is, of the 18th century], music introduced by Tchaikovsky in his [late operas] The Queen of Spades and Iolanta." Even Rimsky-Korsakov was not immune. Taruskin writes that the seventh scene of Rimsky-Korsakov's opera Christmas Eve, written in 1895, is "replete with 'wig and farthingale' music", based on the second act of The Queen of Spades.

While he remained genial in public, Rimsky-Korsakov personally found the situation with Tchaikovsky more conflicting. He was uncomfortable that Tchaikovsky was becoming more popular among Rimsky-Korsakov's followers, and had developed a jealous resentment of Tchaikovsky's greater fame. He confessed his fears to his friend, the Moscow critic Semyon Kruglikov, writing that if Tchaikovsky followed through with a contemplated move to Saint Petersburg, a group of followers "will immediately form around him, which Lyadov and Glazunov will certainly join, and after them many others ... [O]ur youth will drown (and not only our youth—look at Lyadov) in a sea of eclecticism that will rob them of their individuality." About this eclecticism, and Tchaikovsky's part in it, Rimsky-Korsakov wrote in his memoirs, seemingly matter-of-factly, "By this time quite an accretion of new elements and young blood had accumulated in Belyayev's circle. New times, new birds, new songs." Yet to Kruglikov he confessed in 1890, "New times, new birds, new birds [sic], new songs—except our birds are not so new, and the new songs they sing are worse than the old ones."

Even with these private reservations, when Tchaikovsky attended Rimsky-Korsakov's nameday party in May 1893, along with Belyayev, Glazunov and Lyadov, Rimsky-Korsakov asked Tchaikovsky personally if he would conduct four concerts of the Russian Musical Society in Saint Petersburg the following season. After some hesitation, Tchaikovsky agreed. As a condition for Tchaikovsky's engagement, the Russian Musical Society required a list of works that he planned to conduct. Among the items on the list Tchaikovsky supplied were Rimsky-Korsakov's Third Symphony and Glazunov's orchestral fantasy The Forest.

At the first of these appearances, on October 28, 1893, Tchaikovsky conducted the premiere of his Sixth Symphony, along with his First Piano Concerto with Adele aus der Ohe as soloist. Tchaikovsky did not live to conduct the other three concerts, as he died on November 6, 1893. Rimsky-Korsakov stood in for him at the second of these events, an all-Tchaikovsky concert in memory of the composer, on December 12, 1893. The program included the Fourth Symphony, Francesca da Rimini, Marche Slave and some solo piano works played by Felix Blumenfeld.

== Legacy ==
While the Belyayev circle remained a nationalistic school of composition, its exposure to Tchaikovsky and his music made it more readily amenable to Western practices of composition, producing works that were a synthesis of nationalist tradition and Western technique. Overall, however, the degree of influence Tchaikovsky's music had on the Belyayev composers was short-lived. They generally continued stylistically from where The Five stopped, falling back on clichés and mannerisms taken from the works of Rimsky-Korsakov and Balakirev. Even in the case of Glazunov, who was deeply influenced by Tchaikovsky's music when he wrote his Third Symphony, the shadow of Tchaikovsky would become less prevalent with his subsequent symphonies, and he would reconcile it, along with the earlier influences of Balakirev, Borodin and Rimsky-Korsakov, into an eclectic mature style. This eclecticism, according to musicologist Boris Schwarz, would effectively rob Glazunov's music of "the ultimate stamp of originality", and its academicism would tend to overpower Glazunov's inspiration. These traits would hold true for works by other Belyayev composers, as well, with the "gradual academization of the Russian school" leading to "the emergence of production-line 'Russian style' pieces, polished and correct, but lacking originality".

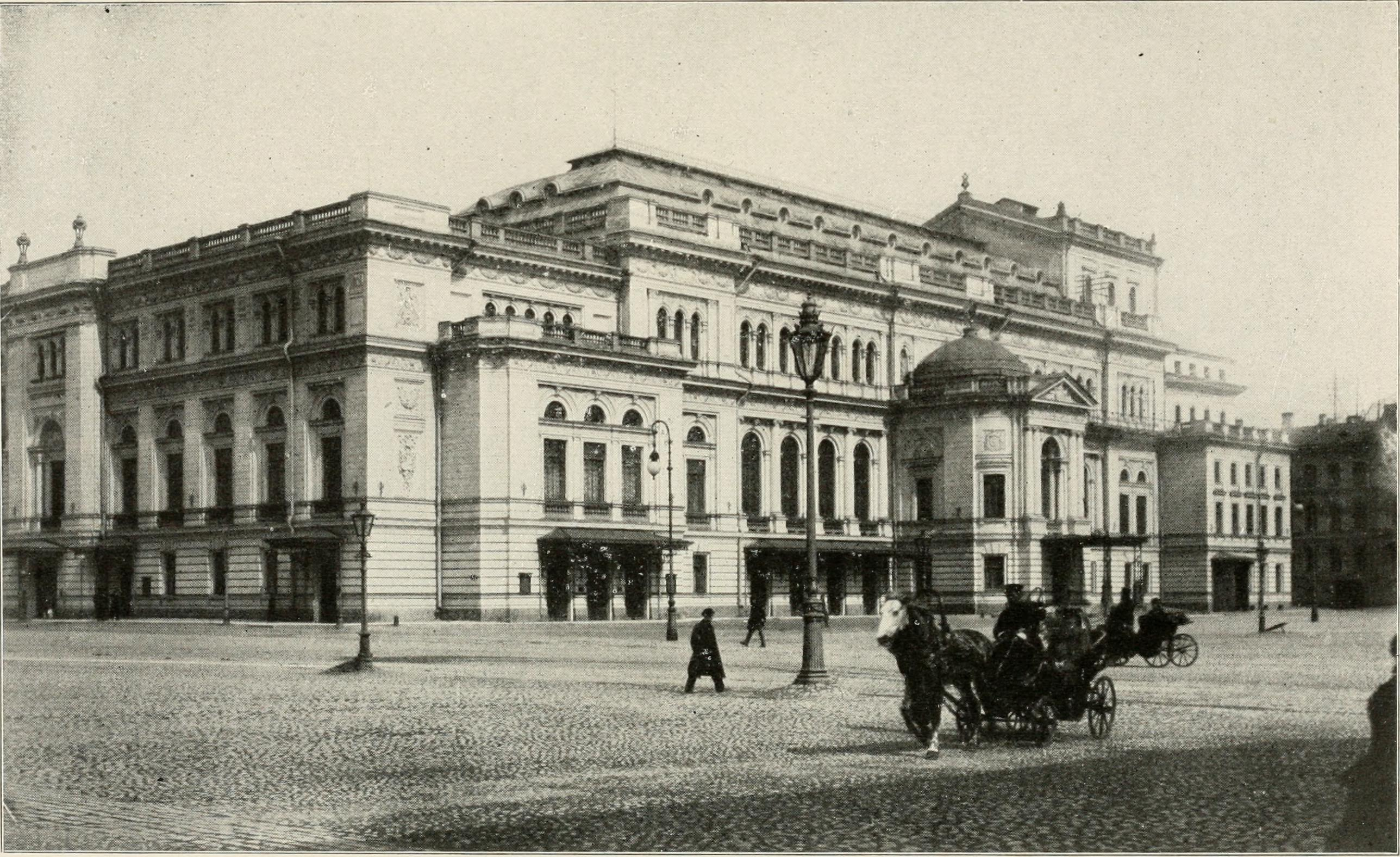
Saint Petersburg Conservatory

Tchaikovsky's music remained popular in Russia as well as abroad, and his scholarly prowess was admired by the Belyayev circle; however, these composers chose not to emulate his style. Composers who wished to be part of this group and desired Belyayev's patronage had to write in a musical style approved by Glazunov, Lyadov and Rimsky-Korsakov. That approved style, Maes writes, included harmonies from the coronation scene in Mussorgsky's opera Boris Godunov, the colorful harmonization and octotonicism of Rimsky-Korsakov's operas Mlada and Sadko, and Balakirev's folk-song stylizations. These elements "served as a store of recipes for writing Russian national music. In the portrayal of the national character ... these techniques prevailed over the subjects portrayed." Taruskin writes that echoing this style of writing became the prime order of business, with absolute music such as symphonies and chamber works preferred over the program music favored by The Five, and quasi-oriental themes such as those used in Balakirev's Islamey and Rimsky-Korsakov's Scheherazade scoffed at. The trend toward writing in the preferred style would continue at the Saint Petersburg Conservatory after Rimsky-Korsakov's retirement in 1906, with his son-in-law Maximilian Steinberg in charge of composition classes at the Conservatory through the 1920s. Dmitri Shostakovich would complain about Steinberg's musical conservatism, typified by such phrases as "the inviolable foundations of the kuchka", and the "sacred traditions of Nikolai Andreyevich [Rimsky-Korsakov]". (Kuchka, short for Moguchaya kuchka or "Mighty Handful", was another name for The Five.) Eventually, the Belyayev aesthetic spread as more of its composers took up academic posts in music conservatories throughout Russia. Mikhail Ippolitov-Ivanov became director of the Moscow Conservatory, where Tchaikovsky had once exerted great influence, and Reinhold Glière likewise in Kiev, ensuring that these institutes "retained a direct link with the Belyayev aesthetic".

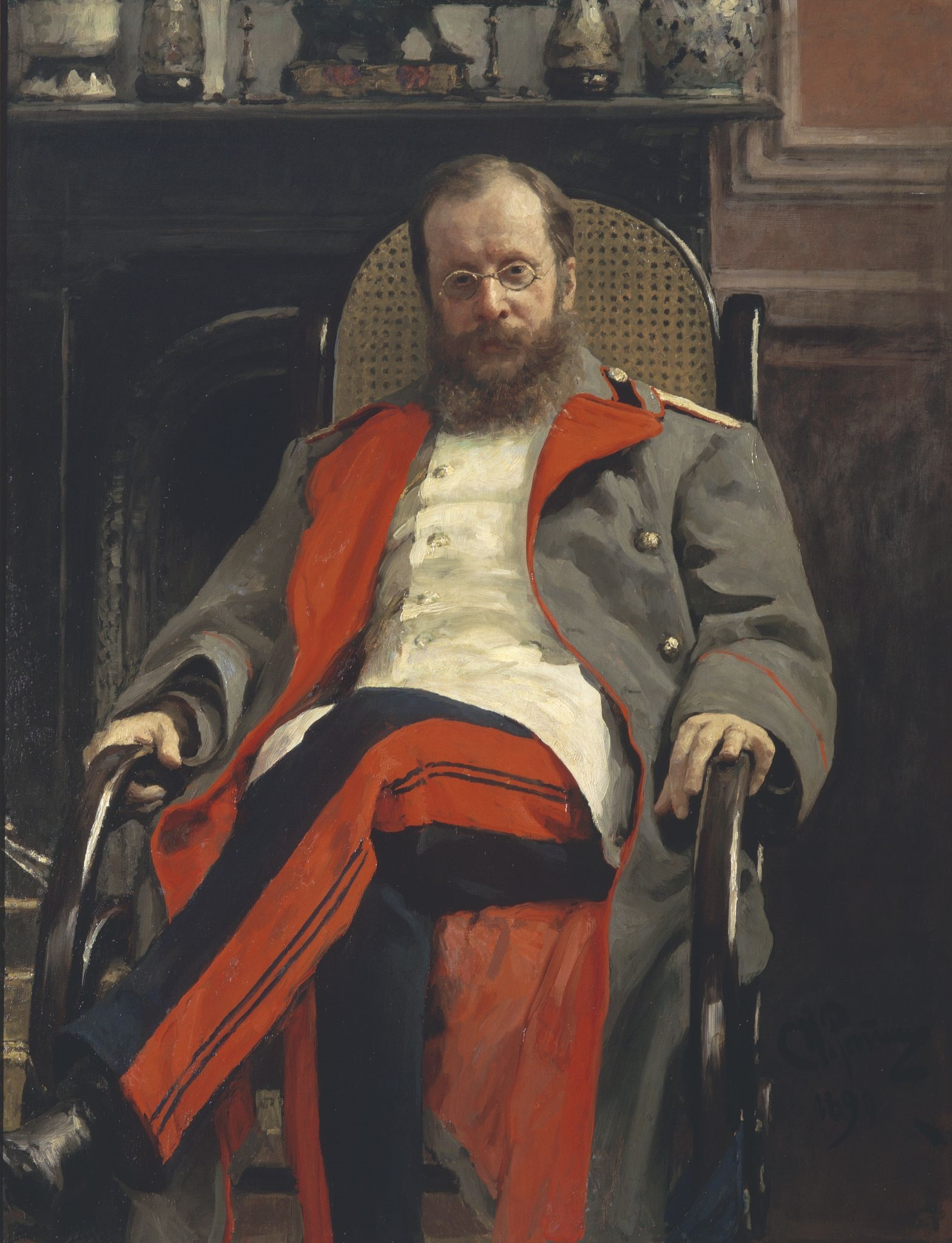
Portrait of César Cui by Ilya Repin

The triumph of the Belyayev circle could be seen as the worst of both worlds from The Five and Tchaikovsky for two reasons. First, from Tchaikovsky and Rimsky-Korsakov, the Belyayevets realized the importance of a solid academic grounding, but they took the importance of their conservatory training to extremes, and devolved into academicism and epigonism. They failed to take into account that Tchaikovsky transcended what authority David Brown calls "the heavy conditioning of his conservatory training" through his "innate Russianness and his love of his own country's folk music", and that Rimsky-Korsakov similarly transcended a period of extremely pedantic music writing to arrive at a more balanced style. Second, the Belyayevets got the idea from The Five of a school to which all members would adhere, but they took adherence to their school to the point of mediocrity, with "a safe conformism" becoming "increasingly the rule". This was the point that composer César Cui, a former member of The Five, made in his article "Fathers and Sons" in 1888, when he wrote, "Despite the frequent contact of all the fathers with one another, each of them preserved intact his individuality. It is enough to glance at a single page of music by one of the fathers to say with certainty that it is the work of Borodin, Balakirev, Mussorgsky, Tchaikovsky, or [Rimsky-]Korsakov. The music of the sons is the music of clones." Taruskin adds,

The institutionalization and professionalization of musical life against which Stasov had fought tooth and nail in the 1860s was now a fait accompli, and composers of the New Russian School occupied all seats of authority. They "extended despotic power over the style and form" of their students' work, attempting to "force it into a certain academic mold." They presided over "a fruitless distribution of awards and prizes" and oversaw the "proliferation of volumes of worthless compositions."
