= List of symphonies in F-sharp minor =

The list of symphonies in F♯ minor includes:

- George Frederick Bristow
  - Symphony in F♯ minor, Op. 26 (1859)
- Alexander Glazunov
  - Symphony No. 2, Op. 16 (1884-6)
- Joseph Haydn
  - Symphony No. 45 "Farewell" (1772)
- Konstantin Ivanov
  - Space Symphony in F♯ minor (1975)
- Paul Juon
  - Symphony in F♯ minor, Op. 10 (1895)
- Nikolai Myaskovsky
  - Symphony No. 21, Op. 51 (1940)
- Dora Pejačević
  - Symphony in F♯ minor, Op. 41 (1916–17, rev. 1920)
- Louis Vierne
  - Organ Symphony No. 3, Op. 28 (1911)
- Nikolai Rimsky-Korsakov
  - Antar (1868)
