= Russian Symphony Concerts =

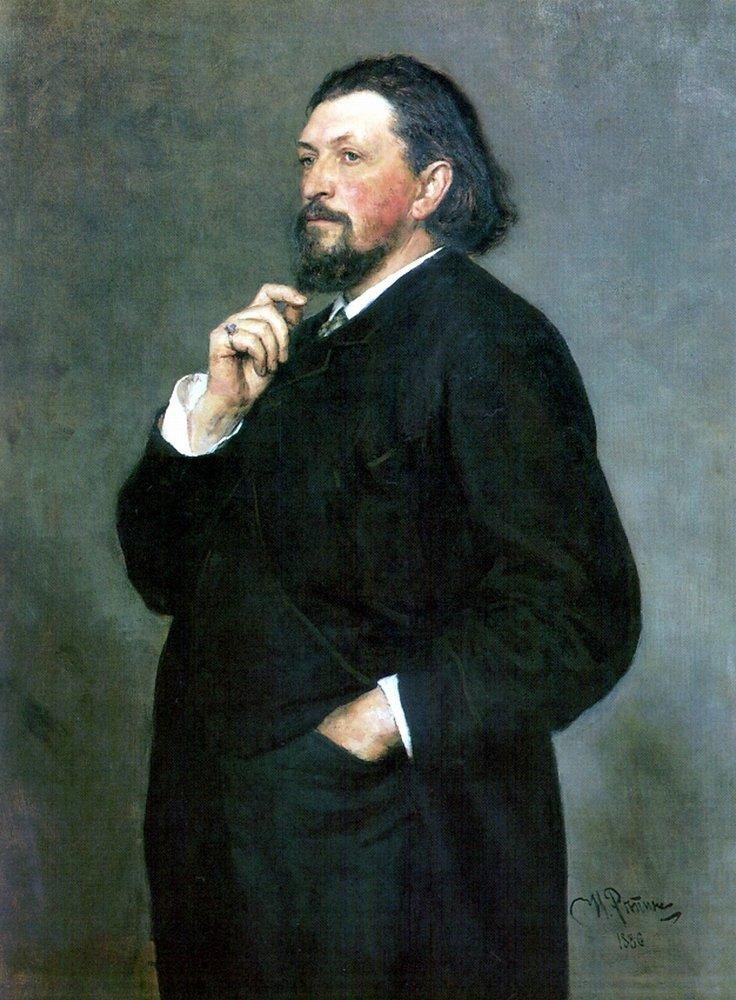
Portrait of M.P. Belyayev, founder of the Russian Symphony Concerts, by Ilya Repin

The Russian Symphony Concerts (Russian: Русские симфонические концерты) were a series of Russian classical music concerts hosted by timber magnate and musical philanthropist Mitrofan Belyayev in St. Petersburg as a forum for young Russian composers to have their orchestral works performed. While a number of works by these composers were performed, pieces written by composers of the previous generation such as Nikolai Rimsky-Korsakov and Mily Balakirev were also played there.

== History ==
The idea for the Russian Symphony Concerts was Rimsky-Korsakov's. He had become acquainted with Belyayev at the weekly "quartet Fridays" ("Les Vendredis") held at Belayev's home. Belayev had already taken a keen interest in the musical future of the teenage Alexander Glazunov, who had been one of Rimsky-Korsakov's composition students. In 1884, Belayev rented out a hall and hired an orchestra to play Glazunov's First Symphony plus an orchestral suite Glazunov had just composed. Glazunov was to conduct part of this concert. Seeing he was not ready to do this, Rimsky-Korsakov volunteered to take his place. This "rehearsal," as Rimsky-Korsakov called it, went well and pleased both Belayev and the invited audience. Buoyed by the success of the rehearsal, Belayev decided the following season to give a public concert of works by Glazunov and other composers. Rimsky-Korsakov's piano concerto was played, along with Glazunov's symphonic poem Stenka Razin.

Both the rehearsal the previous year and this concert gave Rimsky-Korsakov the idea of offering several concerts per year featuring Russian compositions. The number of orchestral compositions was growing, and there were always difficulties in having the Russian Musical Society and other organizations program them. Rimsky-Korsakov mentioned the idea to Belayev. Belayev liked it, inaugurating the Russian Symphony Concerts during the 1886–1887 season. Rimsky-Korsakov shared conducting duties for these concerts.

In 1889 Belyayev engaged Rimsky-Korsakov to conduct two such concerts at the Paris Exposition. Rimsky-Korsakov recalled that although the performances, held at the Trocadéro on 22 and 29 June involving the Concerts Colonne orchestra, had gone well, the audiences had been meagre due to Belyayev's reluctance to advertise the concerts. Nonetheless, the programmes of works by Glinka, Glazunov, Tchaikovsky and Lyadov, as well as works by "the mighty handful" made a profound impression on Maurice Ravel and Ricardo Viñes, who made a point of obtaining a piano duet arrangement of Rimsky-Korsakov's Antar Symphony. So started what was to be an important influence on Ravel's own work.

Glazunov was appointed conductor for the series in 1896. The following year, he led the disastrous premiere of Rachmaninoff's Symphony No 1. While Glazunov's conducting skills were not especially strong and he used his rehearsal time poorly, his alcoholism may have contributed to the debacle.

== Concerts ==
The programs for the concerts held between March 27, 1894, and February 4, 1895, were published by Vladimir Stasov in the Russian-language journal, Musical Gazette, in 1895. It is often unclear whether a work is being premiered or whether it is being premiered within the context of the Concert series.

Year	Date	Composer	Works Premiered	Non-Premiere Works
1884	March 27	Alexander Glazunov	Symphony No. 1	Suite No. 1 Unfinished Suite no. 2
1885	November 23	A. Glazunov	Stenka Razin	Symphony No. 2 (Borodin) Maria's Romance from William Ratcliff (Cesar Cui) Concerto for piano and orchestra (Rimsky-Korsakov) Mazurka (Balakirev) Mvt. 6 from Mosaïque Op.15 (Nikolai Shcherbachov) Etude (Anatoly Lyadov) No. 8 of Persian Songs, Op. 34 (Anton Rubinstein) "On the hills of Georgia" (Rimsky-Korsakov) No. 16 of 20 Romances (Mily Balakirev) The Tempest Fantasy (Pyotr Tchaikovsky)
1886	October 15	Modest Mussorgsky	Night on Bald Mountain	Overture on Russian Themes, 28 (Rimsky-Korsakov) Sérénade mélancolique (Tchaikovsky) Idylle religieuse (Glazunov) 2 Morceaux, Op.24 (Cui) Symphony No. 1 (Borodin)
1886	October 22			Overture on a Spanish March Theme, Op.6 (Balakirev) Tisbe's Arioso from Angelo (Cui) Andante lugubre (Nikolay Sokolov) Scherzo (Felix Blumenfeld) Three romances (Sokolov, Blumenfeld, Rimsky-Korsakov) Stenka Razin (Glazunov) Symphony No. 1 (Tchaikovsky)
1886	October 29	A. Glazunov	Overture No.2 on Greek Themes, Op.6 [possible]	Symphony No. 3 (Rimsky-Korsakov) Marfa's song from Khovanshchina (Mussorgsky) Two Idylls (Shcherbachov) Three romances (Cui, Rimsky-Korsakov, Balakirev) Kamarinskaya (Mikhail Glinka) Night on Bald Mountain (Mussorgsky)
1886	November 5	A. Glazunov Anatoly Lyadov	Symphony No. 2 Scherzo in D major for orchestra, Op. 16 [possible]	Fairy Tale, Op.29 (Rimsky-Korsakov) Concerto for Piano and Orchestra (Alexander Zarzhitsky) Finnish Fantasy (Alexander Dargomyzhsky)
1887	October 24	Alexander Borodin (Note: This concert was dedicated to Alexander Borodin following his death.)		Symphony No. 2 3 Romances In the Steppes of Central Asia Overture of Prince Igor Two movements of Symphony No. 3 (unfinished) Two Romances Polotvsian Dances of Prince Igor
1887	October 31	Nikolai Rimsky-Korsakov C. Cui	Spanish Capriccio 2 Morceaux, Op.36 [possible]	Symphony No. 1 (Glazunov) Intermezzo in modo classico (Mussorgsky) Scherzo in C major (Nikolai Artsybushev) Russia, symphonic poem (Balakirev) Melody for cello and orchestra (Sigismund Blumenfeld)
1887	November 7	K. Antipov A. Glazunov	One piece from 3 Etudes, Op.1 [possible] Mvt. 1 of Symphony No.1 (Konstantin Antipov) Suite caractéristique, Op.9 [possible]	Spring Overture, Op. 1 (Mikhail Ippolitov-Ivanov) Concerto in Cm (Rimsky-Korsakov) Scherzo in F (Cui) Sadko, op. 5 (Rimsky-Korsakov) Three piano solos (Shcherbachov, Lyadov)
1887	November 21	F. Blumenfeld A. Glazunov Anton Arensky Pavel Blaramberg M. Balakirev N. Rimsky-Korsakov	Allegro de concert, Op.7 [possible] Rêverie orientale [possible] Scherzo of Suite in G minor, Op.7 Mvt.2 of Symphony No. 1 in B minor Mazurka No.4 [possible] Sinfonietta on Russian Themes, op. 31 [possible]	Romeo and Juliet (Tchaikovsky) Polotvsian Dances (Borodin/Rimsky-Korsakov) Overture No.1 on 3 Greek Themes, Op.3 (Glazunov) Intermezzo in B (Lyadov) No. 3 of 3 Etudes for Piano, Op.3 (F. Blumenfeld)
1887	December 5	Jāzeps Vītols N. Rimsky-Korsakov A. Glazunov	Symphony in E minor [possible] Concert Fantasia on Russian Themes, Op.33 "The Forest," Symphonic Fantasy [possible]	Mazurka rustique (Lyadov) Spanish Overture No. 1 (Glinka) Mvt. 3 from String Quartet No. 2 (Borodin) Spanish Capriccio (Rimsky-Korsakov)
1888	October 22	N. Rimsky-Korsakov	Scheherazade, op. 35	2 excerpts from Angelo (Cui) Poem lyrique, op. 12 (Glazunov) Concert overture in C# minor (Sergei Lyapunov) 3 Romances (Rimsky-Korsakov, Blumenfeld, Cui) Souvenir d'une nuit d'été à Madrid (Glinka)
1888	November 19			Tamara (Balakirev) Excerpt from William Radcliff (Cui) Mazurka (Glazunov) Scherzo for Orchestra, Op.16 (Lyadov) Two Romances (Rimsky-Korsakov, Glazunov) Symphony No. 1 (Borodin)
1888	December 3	N. Rimsky-Korsakov S. Lyapunov	Russian Easter Festival Overture, op. 36 Symphony No. 1, op. 12	Piano Concerto No. 1, Op. 23 (Tchaikovsky) To the Memory of a Hero, Op.8 (Glazunov) Four piano pieces (Glazunov, Blumenfeld, Lyadov, Shcherbachov) Night on Bald Mountain (Mussorgsky)
1888	December 17	A. Glazunov	Slavonic Festival, Op.26a 2 Pieces for Cello and Orchestra, Op.20	Marche solennelle, Op.18 (Cui) Elegy (Sokolov) Scherzo (Alexander Kopylov) Two piano pieces (Lyadov, Balakirev) The Tempest (Tchaikovsky) Op. 6 (Balakirev)
1889	January 21	F. Blumenfeld	Mazurka, op. 11	Two movements of Symphony No. 3 (Borodin) Three orchestral pieces (Cui) Excerpts from Boris Gudonov (Mussorgsky) Serenade melancolique (Tchaikovsky) Stenka Razin (Glazunov)
1889	February 4			Symphony No. 2 (Glazunov) Maria's Romance from William Ratcliff (Cesar Cui) Breton dance (Cui) Fantasia on Serbian Themes, Op. 6 (Rimsky-Korsakov) 3 Romances (Mussorgsky, Rimsky-Korsakov, Balakirev) Polotvsian Dances of Prince Igor (Borodin)
1889	June 22 (Note: The June 22 and 29th concerts were part of the 1889 Exposition universelle held at the Trocadero Palace in Paris.)			Overture to Ruslan and Lyudmila (Glinka) In the Steppes of Central Asia (Borodin) Mvt. 1 of Piano Concerto No. 1 (Tchaikovsky) Symphony No. 2 (Rimsky-Korsakov) Overture on Russian Themes (Balakirev) 4 minor works (Cui, Lyadov) Finnish Fantasy (A. Dargomyzhsky) Stenka Razin (Glazunov)
1889	June 29			Symphony No. 2 (Glazunov) Piano Concerto in C♯ minor, Op. 30 (Rimsky-Korsakov) Kamarinskaya (Glinka) March and Polotvsian Dances (Borodin) Night on Bald Mountain (Mussorgsky) 3 minor works (Balakirev, Tchaikovsky, Blumenfeld) Scherzo for Orchestra, Op.16 (Lyadov) Spanish Capriccio (Rimsky-Korsakov)
1889	October 28 (Note: The concerts from October, 1889 to 1890 return to the traditional model.)	A. Borodin	Petite suite [possible]	Overture of Prince Kholmsky (Glinka) Yaroslav's Aria from Prince Igor (Borodin) Symphony No. 1 (Glazunov) Two Romances (Cui, Rimsky-Korsakov) Spanish Capriccio (Rimsky-Korsakov)
1889	November 11	J. Vītols	"Ligo Celebration" on Latvian folk themes	Tamara (Balakirev) Recit and Vladimir's Cavatina from Prince Igor (Borodin) 3 Romances (Rimsky-Korsakov, Mussorgsky, Tchaikovsky) Symphony No. 2 (Borodin)
1890	January 20	Cesar Cui A. Glazunov	3 excerpts from Le Filibustier Oriental Rhapsody	Aria from Kroatka (Dütsch) Shcherazade (Rimsky-Korsakov) 2 Romances (Tchaikovsky, Cui) March (Mussorgsky)
1890	February 18			In Arganteau piano suite (Cui) Elegy for Cello (Glazunov) Dodola's Dances and Sunny Villas (Achilles Alferaki) Fantasy for Orchestra in E Major, Op. 28 (Glazunov) Two minor pieces (Arensky, Tchaikovsky) Excerpts from Mlada (Rimsky-Korsakov)
1890	November 3 (Note: The 1890 to 1891 season (Nov. 3 to Feb. 16), was held in the House of Unions in Moscow.)			Russia, symphonic poem (Balakirev) Romances (Mussorgsky) Symphony in E minor (Vitols) "The Forest," Symphonic Fantasy (Glazunov) Romances (Borodin) Kamarinskaya (Glinka)
1890	November 17	Aleksey Petrov C. Cui	Allegro Symphonique in Bm [possible] Suite No.3, Op.43	2 Romances (Glazunov) Symphony No. 3 (Rimsky-Korsakov) Romances (Cui) Idylle Religieuse (Glazunov) Dance of the Peaches from Khovanshchina (Mussorgsky)
1890	December 3	C. Cui	The Two Ghosts ballad	Two movements of unfinished Symphony No. 3 (Borodin) Symphony No. 3 in D (Glazunov) Two Romances (Mussorgsky) Chukhon Fantasia (Dargomyzhsky)
1890	December 22 (Note: This concert was dedicated to the 25th anniversary of Rimsky-Korsakov's career as a composer.)			Symphony No. 1 Piano Concerto in C#m Sadko Antar Easter Festival Overture, op. 36
1891	January 26	F. Blumenfeld	Symphony in Em [possible]	Sinfonietta on Russian Themes, Op.31 (Rimsky-Korsakov) Romances (Rimsky-Korsakov) Scherzo in C major (Artsybushev) Overture No. 1 on Greek Themes (Glazunov)
1891	February 2			Mirage, symphonic poem (Nikolai Klenovsky) Concert Allegro for piano and orchestra (Blumenfeld) Middle East, symphonic poem (Borodin) Two works (Sokolov) Three piano solos (Lyadov, Balakirev, Scherbachev) Slavonic Feast, symphonic poem (Glazunov)
1891	February 16	N. Rimsky-Korsakov	3rd Act of Mlada	The Kremlin, Op. 30 symphonic poem (Glazunov) Romances (Balakirev) Introduction and Polonaise from Boris Godunov (Mussorgsky)
1891	November 30	M. Mussorgsky	Pictures at an Exhibition (Tushmalov's version)	Symphony No. 2 (Borodin) 3 parts of Concert Suites for Violin (Cui) Stenka Razin (Glazunov) Concert Fantasia on Russian Themes (Rimsky-Korsakov)
1892	January 25	N. Sokolov A. Glazunov A. Lyadov	Final Chorus from Don Juan, Op. 5 Two works for female choir Spring, symphonic poem, Op. 34 Final Scene of The Messinian Bride	Fairy Tale, Op.29 (Rimsky-Korsakov) The Destruction of Sennacherib (Mussorgsky) Mazurka for Orchestra (Blumenfeld)
1892	December 12			Symphony No. 3 in D (Glazunov) Three Romances (Rimsky-Korsakov, Cui, Tchaikovsky) Overture of May Night (Rimsky-Korsakov) Overture on Spanish March (Balakirev) Romances and Arragon Hunting (Glinka)
1893	January 16	A. Glazunov	Triumphal March, Op. 40 (Note: The work uses a quotation from Battle Hymn of the Republic. However, the title for its premiere was, Artistic March on An American Theme.)	Suite No. 2 for Orchestra (Cui) Scene from Boris Godunov (Mussorgsky) Sadko/Overture of The Maid of Pskov (Rimsky-Korsakov) Romances (Glazunov, Arensky, Mussorgsky) Two Choral pieces (Mussorgsky, Borodin)
1893	November 20	P. I. Tchaikovsky (Note: The concert was dedicated to Pyotr Tchaikovsky given his death earlier that month on November 6, 1893.)		Symphony No. 4 Francesca da Rimini Aria from The Maid of Orleans Four orchestral works: Op. 21, Impromptu in A, 72, 7 Romances: Op. 73, 65 Slavic March
1893	December 18	A. Glazunov	Waltz and Scherzo Chopiniana, Op. 46	Antar/Excerpt from The Snow Maiden (Rimsky-Korsakov) Overture of The Carnival (Glazunov) Excerpt from Act 3 of May Night (Rimsky-Korsakov)
1894	January 22	A. Glazunov	Symphony No. 4	
1895	March 28	Sergei Rachmaninoff	Symphony No. 1	

== Bibliography ==
- Brown, David, Tchaikovsky: The Final Years, 1885–1893 (New York: W.W. Norton & Company, 1991). ISBN 0-393-03099-7.
- Figes, Orlando, Natasha's Dance: A Cultural History of Russia (New York: Metropolitan Books, 2002). ISBN 0-8050-5783-8 (hc.)
- Harrison, Max, Rachmaninoff: Life, Works, Recordings (London and New York: Continuum, 2005). ISBN 0-8264-5344-9.
- Maes, Francis, tr. Pomerans, Arnold J. and Erica Pomerans, A History of Russian Music: From Kamarinskaya to Babi Yar (Berkeley, Los Angeles and London: University of California Press, 2002). ISBN 0-520-21815-9.
- Nichols, Roger, Ravel (New Haven: Yale University Press, 2011). ISBN 978-0-300-10882-8.
- Rimsky-Korsakov, Nikolai, Letoppis Moyey Muzykalnoy Zhizni (St. Petersburg, 1909), published in English as My Musical Life (New York: Knopf, 1925, 3rd ed. 1942; reprinted London: Faber & Faber, 1989. ISBN 0-571-14245-1).
