= Glinka Prize (1884–1917) =

Russian music award

The Glinka Prize (Russian: Глинкинская премия, romanized: Glinkinskaya premiya) was an annual music award begun by M. P. Belyaev which ran from 1884 to 1917 in the name of Russian composer, Mikhail Glinka. The prize awarded a singular composer for excellence by an elected panel of judges.

The first winners were those belonging to the Belyayev circle, namely M. A. Balakirev, A. P. Borodin, P. I. Tchaikovsky, N. A. Rimsky-Korsakov, Cesar Cui, and A. K. Lyadov.

The selection took place in five categories: chamber, symphonic, operas, ballets, and vocal. The establishment of the prize occurred on November 27, 1884, the time symbolically chosen in connection to the premiere dates of Glinka's operas, Ruslan and Lyudmila and A Life for the Tsar.

Consonant with the competition was several other ventures. He organized the Russian Symphonic Concerts, begun in 1884, although directorially taken over by Rimsky-Korsakov in 1886 followed by others within the so-called Belyayev circle.

In addition, Belyaev also awarded other prizes like his specific prize for string quartets (begun in 1891), performed during, "Russian quartet evenings," as part of his larger Friday evening gatherings dubbed, "Belyaev Fridays."

In total, 216 works were monetarily awarded, however under anonymity through Vladimir Stasov.

== See also ==
- Mikhail Glinka
- Belyayev circle
