= Alexander Winkler (composer) =

Russian compose (1865–1935)

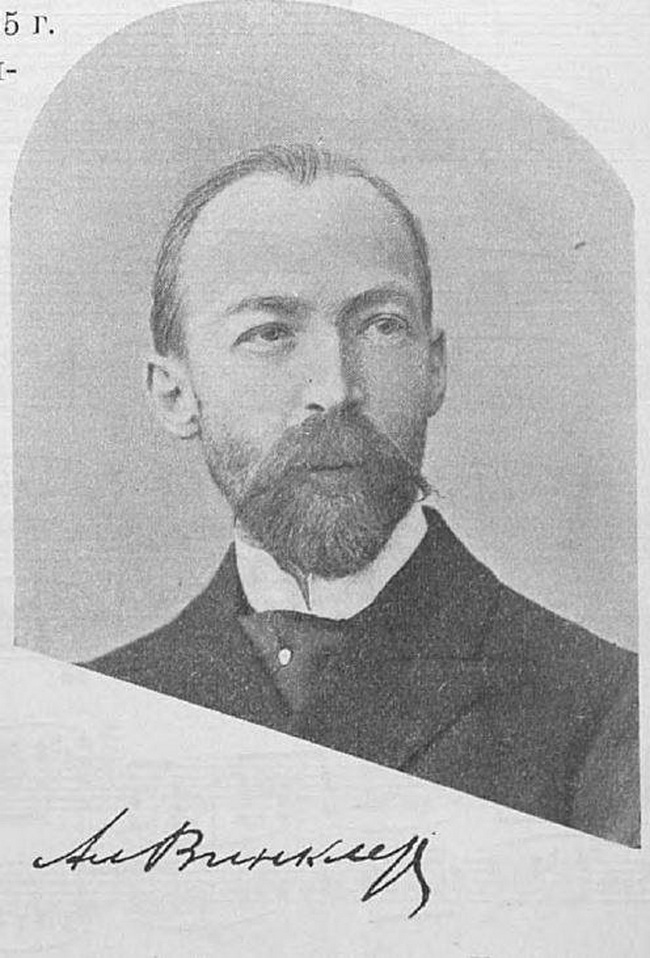

Alexander (Gustav) Adolfovich Winkler, also Alexandre Adolfovitch Winkler (Russian: Александр Адольфович (Густав) Винклер; 3 March 1865 in Kharkiv – 6 August 1935 in Besançon), was a Russian pianist, composer and music educator of German descent.

== Biography ==
Winkler completed his studies in law at the University of Kharkiv, Russian Empire, in 1887 and also studied piano at the Kharkiv Music School of the Russian Musical Society, graduating in 1889. He continued to study piano with Alphonse Duvernoy in Paris, and in Vienna with Theodor Leschetizky, where he was also a composition student of Karel Navrátil.

Winkler returned to the music school in Kharkiv as Professor of Piano from 1890 to 1896. On the recommendation of Leschetizky, he was invited to Saint Petersburg to teach at the Conservatory, where he had piano classes from 1896 to 1924, becoming Professor of Piano in 1909. The young Sergei Prokofiev was one of his pupils from 1905. From 1907, Winkler was music critic for the German-language newspaper St. Petersburgische Zeitung. Like many professors of the Saint Petersburg Conservatory, he was a member of the Belyayev circle, a creative group of musicians led by Nikolai Rimsky-Korsakov, which certainly affected his compositional work.

In 1924, Winkler emigrated to France, where from 1925 he taught at the University of Franche-Comté in Besançon.

Apart from a few songs, Winkler composed only instrumental music, notably compositions for piano and chamber music. He made piano transcriptions for a number of works by Mikhail Glinka, Alexander Glazunov and Rimsky-Korsakov including Capriccio Espagnol and the ballet Raymonda, as well as orchestral works by Alexander Scriabin.

== Selected works ==
Orchestra

- En Bretagne (В Бретани), Ouverture-fantaisie sur 3 chants bretons (Fantasy Overture on 3 Breton Songs), Op. 13 (1908)
- Variations sur un thème russe (Variations on Russian Theme; Вариации на русскую тему), Op. 16 (published 1912)
- Dramatic Overture (Драматическая увертюра)

Concertante

- Air finnois varié (Variations on a Finnish Air; Вариации на финскую тему) for violin and orchestra, Op. 18 (1912)
- Dernier Printemps (The Last Spring; Последняя весна) for cello and orchestra (1935)

Chamber music

- String Quartet No. 1 in C major, Op. 7 (1897)
- Piano Quartet in G minor, Op. 8 (1899)
- String Quartet No. 2 in D major, Op. 9 (1901)
- Sonata in C minor for viola (or violin) and piano, Op. 10 (1902)
- String Quintet in E minor for 2 violins, 2 violas and cello, Op. 11 (1906)
- String Quartet No. 3 in B♭ major, Op. 14 (1909)
- Piano Trio in F♯ minor, Op. 17 (1912)
- Sonata in D minor for cello and piano, Op. 19 (c.1920); dedicated to Alexander Glazunov
- Piano Quintet in D minor, Op. 29 (1933)
- Deux morceaux (2 Pieces) for viola and piano, Op. 31 (1933)

1. Méditation élégiaque
2. La toupie: Scène d'enfant

Piano

- Variations et fugue sur un thème original (Variations and Fugue on an Original Theme), Op. 1
- Deux morceaux (2 Pieces; Две пьесы), Op. 3 (1894)

1. Gavotte
2. Impromptu à la Schumann

- Drei Klavierstücke im alten Stile (3 Piano Pieces in Old Style), Op. 4 (1895)

1. Sarabande
2. Gigue
3. Minuetto

- Trois morceaux (3 Pieces; Три пьесы), Op. 6 (1897)

1. Étude-humoresque
2. Berceuse
3. Valse-impromptu

- Variations et fugue sur un thème de J. S. Bach (Variations and Fugue on a Theme by J. S. Bach; Вариации и фуга на тему И.-С. Баха) in E♭ major for 2 pianos, Op. 12 (1906)
- Trois morceaux (3 Pieces; Три пьесы), Op. 15 (1909)

1. Prélude in D minor
2. Caprice in C minor
3. Étude in B♭ minor

- Au Cimetière: Passacaglia pour Piano en mode phrygien (At the Cemetery: Passacaglia for Piano in Phrygian mode) in D minor/D phrygian, Op. 23

Vocal

- 5 Mélodies for voice and piano, Op. 2

Literary

- A Brief Guide to Basic Music Theory (Краткое руководство по элементарной теории музыки) (1895, Kharkiv)

== Discography ==
- Russian Viola Sonatas – Eliesha Nelson (viola), Glen Inanga (piano); Sono Luminus DSL-92136 (2011)

Sonata for viola and piano, Op. 10
Two Pieces for viola and piano, Op. 31

- Viola Incognita – Pavel Ciprys (viola), Daniel Wiesner (piano); RadioServis (Czech Radio) CR0386-2 (2012)

Sonata for viola and piano, Op. 10
