= Symphony No. 3 (Glazunov) =

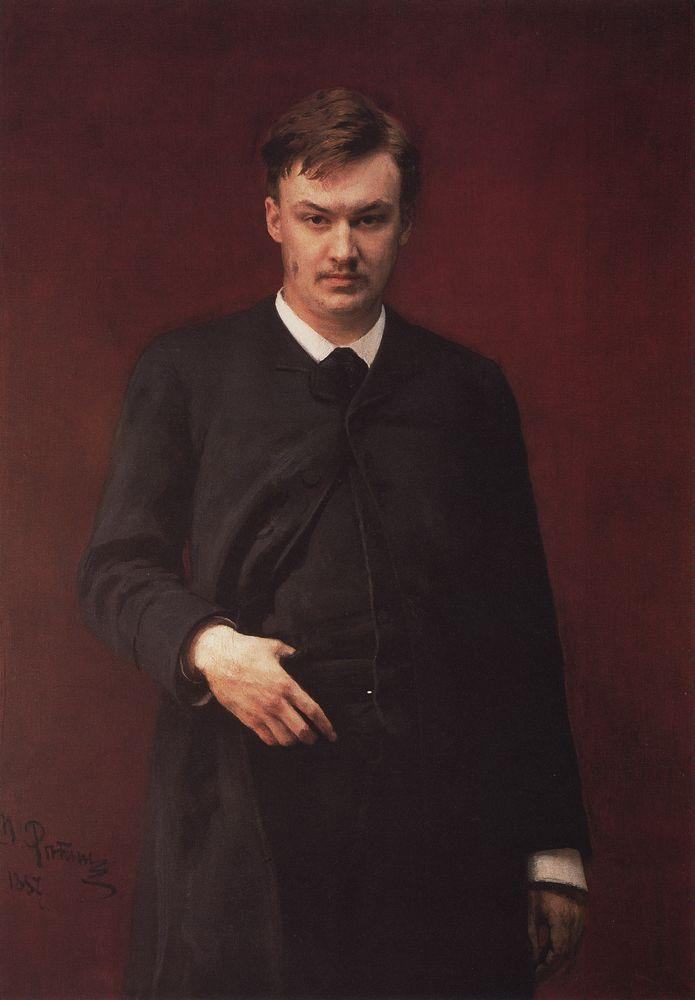
Portrait of Alexander Glazunov by Ilya Repin, 1887

Alexander Glazunov composed his Symphony No. 3 in D major, Op. 33, in 1890, and it was published by 1892 by the Leipzig firm owned by Mitrofan Belyayev. The symphony is dedicated to Pyotr Ilyich Tchaikovsky and was first performed in St. Petersburg in December 1890 under the baton of Anatoly Lyadov.

The symphony is considered a transitional work, with Glazunov largely eschewing the influences of Balakirev, Borodin, and Rimsky-Korsakov inherent in his earlier symphonies for the newer influences of Tchaikovsky and Wagner. Because of this change, the Third has been called the "anti-kuchkist" symphony in Glazunov's output (kuchkist from kuchka, the shortened Russian name for the nationalist music group The Five). He would tone down these new influences in his subsequent symphonies as he strove for an eclectic mature style. The Third also shows a greater depth of expression, most evident in the chromatic turns of its third movement, reminiscent of Wagner's opera Tristan und Isolde.

== Instrumentation ==
Woodwinds

3 flutes (1 taking piccolo)
2 oboes
2 clarinets
2 bassoons

Brass

4 horns
3 trumpets
3 trombones
tuba

Percussion

timpani
percussion

Strings

violins
violas
violoncellos
double basses

== Structure ==
Four movements make up the work:

1. Allegro
2. Scherzo. Vivace. (6/16 and 2/8 mixed time signatures, in F major)
3. Andante. (C♯ minor)
4. Finale. Allegro moderato

== Overview ==
Although the earliest sketches of this work date to 1883, the symphony was an example of Glazunov's effort to break away in a larger form from the nationalist style that animated the compositions of The Mighty Handful (then the most important musical influence in Russia) to reflect what Glazunov felt to be universal forms, moods and themes. He had already explored this desire in smaller works such as the Poem lyrique for orchestra (1881-7), a piece much admired by Tchaikovsky, as well as in the elegy To the Memory of a Hero (Pamyati geroya) (1881-5). The Symphony No. 3, however, was Glazunov's largest orchestral work to aspire to an artistic mould beyond that espoused by the Five. Tchaikovsky's influence is clear, especially in the work's lyrical episodes.

In 1924, when Glazunov shared his reminiscences of Tchaikovsky, he said, "He also knew my Third Symphony, which is dedicated to him. Much in it found his approval and, at his request, I often played the scherzo of the symphony to him on the piano. When I asked him what he would regard as the most significant weakness in my works, he said: 'Some longevities and the lack of pauses.' Later, when Pyotr Ilyich had long departed this world, I always remembered his words, and in my subsequent production I always took pains to pay heed to them."

== Bibliography ==
- Lobanova, Marina, Notes for Glazunov: Ballade; Symphony No. 3; BBC National Orchestra of Wales conducted by Tadaaki Otaka.
