= Belyayev circle =

Society of Russian musicians

The Belyayev circle (Russian: Беляевский кружок) was a society of Russian musicians who met in Saint Petersburg, Russia between 1885 and 1908, and whose members included Nikolai Rimsky-Korsakov, Alexander Glazunov, Vladimir Stasov, Anatoly Lyadov, Alexander Ossovsky, Witold Maliszewski, Nikolai Tcherepnin, Nikolay Sokolov, Alexander Winkler among others. The circle was named after Mitrofan Belyayev, a timber merchant and amateur musician who became a music philanthropist and publisher after hearing the music of the teenage Glazunov.

The Belyayev circle believed in a national style of classical music, based on the achievements of the composer group The Five which preceded it. One important difference between composers in the Belyayev circle and their counterparts in the Five was an acceptance in the necessity of Western-styled academic training; this was an attitude passed down by Rimsky-Korsakov, who taught many of the composers in the circle at the Saint Petersburg Conservatory. While these composers were more open to Western compositional practices and influences, especially through the music of Pyotr Ilyich Tchaikovsky, they closely followed many of the compositional practices of the Five to the point of mannerism, especially in their depiction of folkloric subject matter.

The Belyayev circle came to dominate musical life in St. Petersburg. Composers who desired patronage, publication or public performance of their works through Belyayev were compelled to write in a musical style accepted by Glazunov, Lyadov and Rimsky-Korsakov. There was also peer pressure to compose in this style, as well as a distrust of composers who did not do so. Several composers who believed in the philosophy of the Belyayev circle became professors and heads of music conservatories in Russia, which extended the influence of the group past the physical confines of St. Petersburg and timewise well into the 20th century.

== Belyayev ==
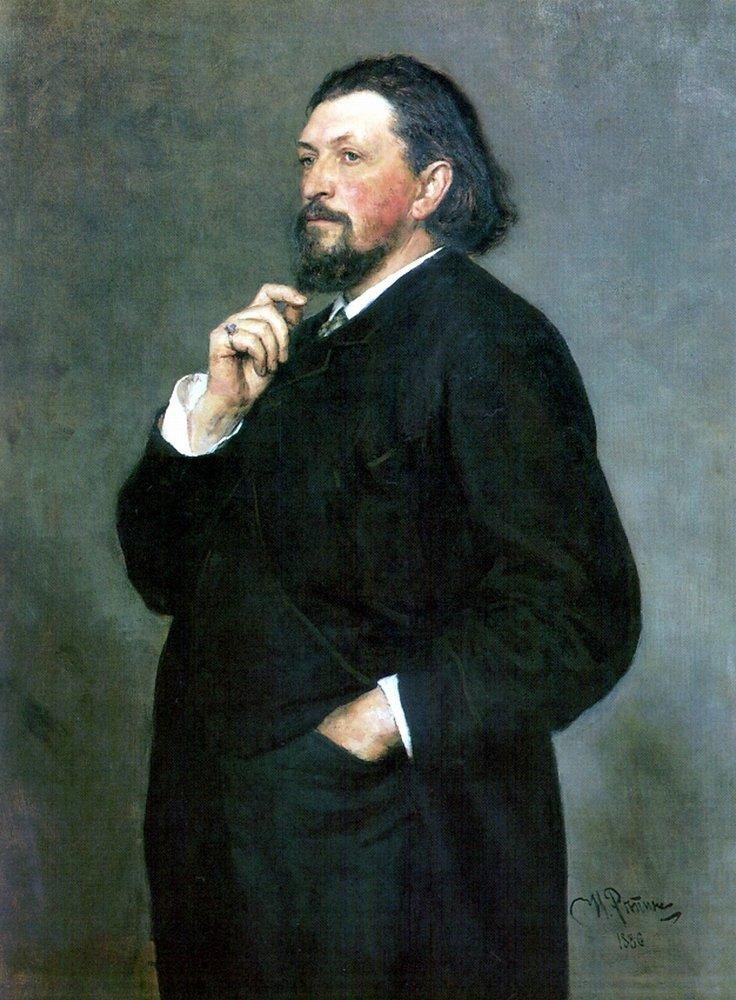
Portrait of Mitrofan Belyayev by Ilya Repin

Belyayev was one of a growing number of Russian nouveau-riche industrialists who became patrons of the arts in mid- to late-19th century Russia; their number included Nadezhda von Meck, railway magnate Savva Mamontov and textile manufacturer Pavel Tretyakov. While Nadezhda von Meck insisted on anonymity in her patronage in the tradition of noblesse oblige, Belyayev, Mamontov and Tretyakov "wanted to contribute conspicuously to public life". Because of their cultural and political orientation, they were more likely than the aristocracy to support native talent, and were more inclined to support nationalist artists over cosmopolitan ones. This was not due to any social or political agenda implicit in the art, but due to the Russianness of the art itself. This included the music of the composers Belyayev chose to support.

An amateur viola player and chamber music enthusiast, Belyayev hosted "quartet Fridays" at his home in St. Petersburg. A frequent visitor to these gatherings was Rimsky-Korsakov. Belyayev became a music patron after he had heard the First Symphony by the sixteen-year-old Glazunov, who had been discovered by Balakirev and tutored by Rimsky-Korsakov in musical composition, counterpoint and orchestration. Not only did Glazunov become a fixture of the "quartet Fridays", but Belyayev also published Glazunov's work and took him on a tour of Western Europe. This tour included a visit to Weimar, Germany to present the young composer to famed Hungarian composer and pianist Franz Liszt.

Soon Belyayev became interested in other Russian composers. In 1884 he set up an annual Glinka prize, named after pioneer Russian composer Mikhail Glinka (1804–1857). In 1885 he founded his own music publishing firm, based in Leipzig, Germany, through which he published works by Glazunov, Rimsky-Korsakov, Lyadov and Borodin at his own expense. By publishing in Leipzig, Belyayev could offer the double benefit of higher quality music printing than was available in Russia at the time, plus the protection of international copyright which Russia did not offer. At Rimsky-Korsakov's suggestion, Belyayev also founded his own concert series, the Russian Symphony Concerts, open exclusively to Russian composers. Among the works written especially for this series were the three by Rimsky-Korsakov by which he is currently best known in the West—Scheherazade, the Russian Easter Festival Overture and Capriccio espagnol. To select which composers to assist with money, publication or performances from the many who now appealed for help, Belyayev set up an advisory council made up of Glazunov, Lyadov and Rimsky-Korsakov. They would look through the compositions and appeals submitted and suggest which composers were deserving of patronage and public attention.

== Influence ==
The musical scene in St. Petersburg came to be dominated by the Belyayev circle since Rimsky-Korsakov had taught many of its members at the Conservatory there. Since Glazunov, Lyadov and Rimsky-Korsakov acted in an advisory capacity to the Belyayev enterprises, and thus became channels of Belyayev's largesse, composers who wished to be part of this circle and who desired Belyayev's patronage had to write in a musical style approved by these three men. Because of this stricture, Rimsky-Korsakov's style became the preferred academic style—one that young composers had to follow if they hoped to have any sort of career. In this sense, the Belyayev circle acted as a compositional guild. The better pupils from the St. Petersburg Conservatory received initiation by their invitation to the "quartet Fridays", and admission to the circle "guaranteed well remunerated publication by Edition Belieff, Leipzig, and performance in the Russian Symphony Concert programs". Thus, the Belyayev circle "set up an establishment that governed all aspects of musical creation, education and performance".

== Philosophy ==
The Belyayev circle ran counter in its philosophy to the artistic movement and magazine Mir iskusstva (Russian: «Мир иску́сства», World of Art). Mir iskusstva "identified with the artistic values of the [Russian] aristocracy" in its cosmopolitanism and belief of a universal culture. The composers of the Belyayev circle, like the Five before it, believed in a national, realist form of Russian classical music that should stand apart in its style and characteristics from Western European classical music. In this sense, the Belyayev composers shared similar goals with the Abramtsevo Colony and Russian Revival in the sphere of fine arts. Another way Mir iskusstva disagreed with the Belyayev circle was that they believed the composers under Belyayev were practicing art for art's sake, much like a social program. This practice ran counter to their belief in focusing on "art as the spiritual expression of the individual's creative genius", as they felt Alexander Pushkin had done in his poetry and Tchaikovsky in his music. Alfred Nurok commented in an 1899 review in Mir iskusstva:

Mr. Belyayev's Maecenas activities bear a very special imprint. His undeniably lavish patronage of Russian music of the newest variety does not, unfortunately, so much facilitate the development of the talents of gifted but as yet unrecognized composers, as it encourages young people who have successfully completed their conservatory course to cultivate productivity come what may, touching little upon the question of their creative abilities. Mr. Belyayev encourages industry above all, and under his aegis musical composition has assumed the character of a workers' collective (artel), or even a crafts industry.

—

Musicologist Richard Taruskin wrote, "Within the Belyayev circle a safe conformism became increasingly the rule". Concert programs needed to be filled with new Russian works, and new works had to be published to offer to the music public. It was therefore necessary "to dip rather deep into the pool of available Conservatory trained talent", and the circle became known for the number of less-than-first-rate talents harbored within it. Critic and composer César Cui, who had been part of the Five along with Rimsky-Korsakov, derisively called these younger composers "clones". Though there was some snobbism involved in criticism of the Belyayev circle, there was also enough truth in the issue of conformism to cause the circle some embarrassment. A contributing factor to this conformism was the gradual academization of composers in the nationalist circle, fueled by Rimsky-Korsakov's efforts in this regard with his students. An increasing number of these students joined the Belyayev circle; the result was "the emergence of production-line 'Russian style' pieces, polished and correct, but lacking originality".

== Comparison to the Five ==
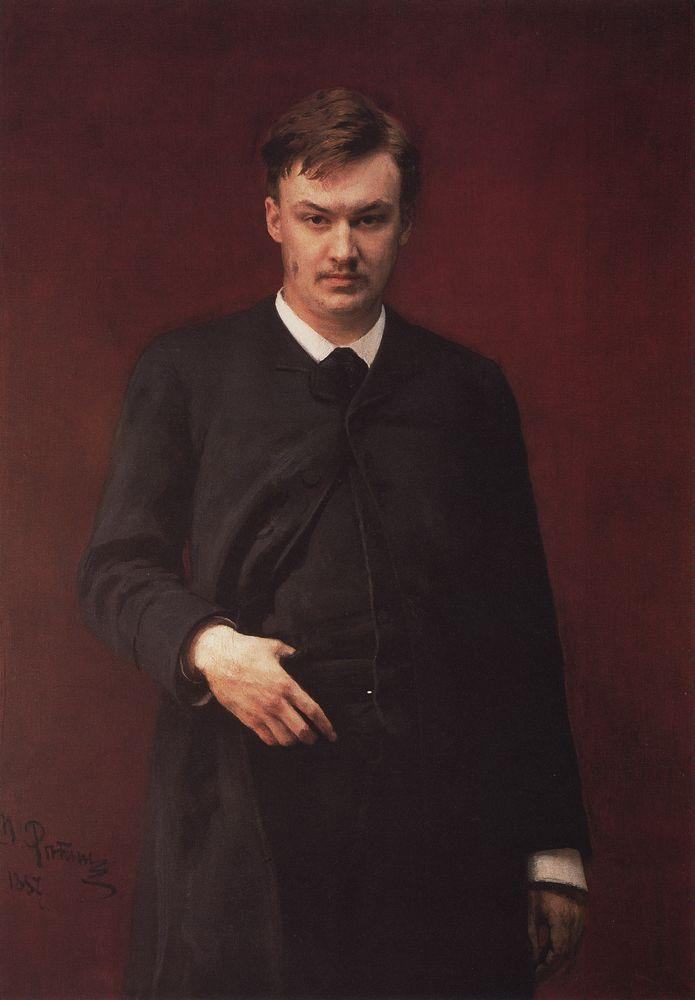
Portrait of Alexander Glazunov by Ilya Repin, 1887

The composers who formed the Belyayev circle were nationalistic in their outlook, as were The Five before them. Like the Five, they believed in a uniquely Russian style of classical music that utilized folk music and exotic melodic, harmonic and rhythmic elements, as exemplified by the music of Balakirev, Borodin and Rimsky-Korsakov. Unlike the Five, these composers also believed in the necessity of an academic, Western-based background in composition. The necessity of Western compositional techniques was something that Rimsky-Korsakov had instilled in many of them in his years at the St. Petersburg Conservatory. Compared to the "revolutionary" composers in Balakirev's circle, Rimsky-Korsakov found those in the Belyayev circle to be "progressive ... attaching as it did great importance to technical perfection, but ... also broke new paths, though more securely, even if less speedily...."

Glazunov's attitude toward outside influences was typical of the Belyayev circle. He studied Tchaikovsky's works and "found much that was new ... that was instructive for us as young musicians. It struck me that Tchaikovsky, who was above all a lyrical and melodic composer, had introduced operatic elements into his symphonies. I admired the thematic material of his works less than the inspired unfolding of his thoughts, his temperament and the constructural perfection." Rimsky-Korsakov noted "a tendency toward eclecticism" among the composers in the Belyayev circle, as well as a "predilection ... for Italian-French music of the time of wig and farthingale [that is, the eighteenth century], music introduced by Tchaikovsky in his Queen of Spades and Iolanthe".

Nevertheless, while the Belyayev circle was more tolerant of outside influence to a certain degree than their predecessors under Balakirev, they still followed the compositional practices of the Five closely. Maes writes, "The harmonies of Mussorgsky's coronation scene in Boris, the octatonicism of Mlada and Sadko, Balakirev's folk-song stylizations, Rimsky-Korsakov's colorful harmonization—all these served as a store of recipes for writing Russian national music. In the portrayal of the national character ... these techniques prevailed over the subjects portrayed".

== Folklorism, orientalism, "fantastic" style ==
Unlike their predecessors in the Five, composers in the Belyayev circle did not concern themselves greatly with folklorism—the invention or adaptation of folklore to newly written stories or songs, or to folklore that is reworked and modified for modern tastes. They also did not travel to other parts of Russia to actively search for folk songs, as Balakirev had done. When the Belyayev composers produced folkloric works, "they simply imitated Balakirev's or Rimsky-Korsakov's styles".

One of the Belyayev composers, Mikhail Ippolitov-Ivanov, continued the Five's work in musical orientalism—the use of exotic melodic, harmonic and rhythmic elements to depict the middle- and far-eastern parts of the Russian Empire. He wrote three operas set in an oriental background and composed in Balakirev's style—Ruth, Azra and Izmena. The story for the last of these operas "deals with the struggle between Christians and Muslims during the sixteenth-century occupation of Georgia by the Persians". Ippolotov-Ivanov is best known in the West for his two sets of Caucasian Sketches "an orientalist orchestral work modeled on Balakirev and Borodin".

Lyadov wrote in a "fantastic" vein akin to Rimsky-Korsakov's, especially in his tone poems based on Russian fairy tales, Baba Yaga, Kikimora and The Enchanted Lake. This style of musical writing was based on extensive use of the whole tone scale and the octatonic scale to depict supernatural or magical characters and events, hence the term "fantastic". Though he would break from the Belyayev aesthetic in subsequent works, Igor Stravinsky wrote his ballet The Firebird in a similar musical style.

== Intolerance of non-compliant composers ==
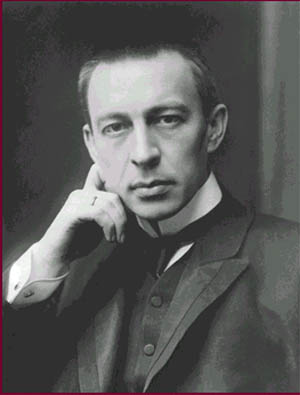
Sergei Rachmaninoff

Despite Rimsky-Korsakov's denial of bias among composers of the Belyayev circle, musicologist Solomon Volkov mentions that they and the Five shared a mutual suspicion of compositions that did not follow its canon. This proved especially true of the First Symphony of Sergei Rachmaninoff, a Moscow composer and protege of Tchaikovsky. Rimsky-Korsakov, whose own musical preferences in his later years were not overly progressive, may have sounded an advance warning on hearing the symphony in rehearsal when he told Rachmaninoff, "Forgive me, but I do not find this music at all agreeable". By the reports of many present, the rehearsal that Rimsky-Korsakov had heard, conducted by Glazunov, was both a disaster as a performance and a horrific travesty of the score. The premiere, held in St. Petersburg on March 28, 1897, went no better. Cui wrote in his review of the work, among other things, "If there were a conservatory in Hell, and if one of its talented students were to compose a programme symphony based on the story of the Ten Plagues of Egypt, and if he were to compose a symphony like Mr. Rachmaninoff's, then he would have fulfilled his task brilliantly and would delight the inhabitants of Hell". The symphony was not performed again in Rachmaninoff's lifetime, and while Rachmaninoff did not destroy or disavow the score, he suffered a psychological collapse that led to a three-year creative hiatus.

== Modernism ==
Maes writes that the composers who formed the Belyayev circle have often been described as "important links to, and pathbreakers for" modernist Russian composers such as Stravinsky and Sergei Prokofiev. This, he asserts, is actually a false assumption which suggests that modernism was the result of a gradual process. The truth, Maes suggests, was that modernist music in Russia was a much more radical break from the Belyayev circle than many have claimed. Rimsky-Korsakov's extensive use of the octatonic scale and other harmonic experiments "was a gold mine for those bent on a modernist revolution," Maes writes. "However, the renewing force had still to be liberated from the cliches and routines into which the Belyayev aesthetic had been pressed".

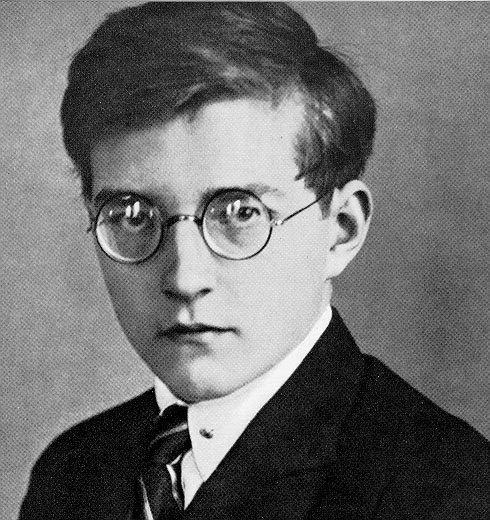
Dmitri Shostakovich, 1925

== Legacy ==
Bias toward the musical aesthetics practiced by the Belyayev circle would continue at the St. Petersburg Conservatory after Rimsky-Korsakov's retirement in 1906, with his son-in-law Maximilian Steinberg in charge of composition classes at the Conservatory through the 1920s. Dmitri Shostakovich would complain about Steinberg's musical conservatism, typified by such phrases as "the inviolable foundations of the kuchka" and the "sacred traditions of Nikolai Andreyevich [Rimsky-Korsakov]". Nor was this traditionalism limited to St. Petersburg. Well into the Soviet era, many other music conservatories remained run by traditionalists such as Ippolitov-Ivanov in Moscow and Reinhold Glière in Kiev. Because of these individuals, Maes writes, "the conservatories retained a direct link with the Belyayev aesthetic".

== Bibliography ==
- Bertensson, Sergei and Jay Leyda, with the assistance of Sophia Satina, Sergei Rachmaninoff—A Lifetime in Music (Washington Square, New York: New York University Press, 1956)). ISBN n/a.
- Fay, Laurel, Shostakovich: A Life (Oxford and New York: Oxford University Press, 2000). ISBN 0-19-518251-0.
- Figes, Orlando, Natasha's Dance: A Cultural History of Russia (New York: Metropolitan Books, 2002). ISBN 0-8050-5783-8 (hc.).
- Frolova-Walker, Marina, "Rimsky-Korsakov. Russian family of musicians. (1) Nikilay Andreyevich Rimsky-Korsakov". In The New Grove Dictionary of Music and Musicians, Second Edition (London: Macmillan, 2001) 29 vols., ed. Stankey Sadie. ISBN 1-56159-239-0.
- Harrison, Max, Rachmaninoff: Life, Works, Recordings (London and New York: Continuum, 2005). ISBN 0-8264-5344-9.
- Lobanova, Marina, Notes for BIS CD 1358, Glazunov: Ballade; Symphony No. 3; BBC National Orchestra of Wales conducted by Tadaaki Otaka.
- Maes, Francis, tr. Pomerans, Arnold J. and Erica Pomerans, A History of Russian Music: From Kamarinskaya to Babi Yar (Berkeley, Los Angeles and London: University of California Press, 2002). ISBN 0-520-21815-9.
- Rimsky-Korsakov, Nikolai, Letoppis Moyey Muzykalnoy Zhizni (St. Petersburg, 1909), published in English as My Musical Life (New York: Knopf, 1925, 3rd ed. 1942). ISBN n/a.
- Schwarz, Boris, "Glazunov, Alexander Konstantinovich". In The New Grove Dictionary of Music and Musicians (London: Macmillan, 1980), 20 vols., ed. Stanley Sadie. ISBN 0-333-23111-2.
- Taruskin, Richard, Stravinsky and the Russian Traditions: A Biography of the Works Through Mavra, Volume 1 (Oxford and New York: Oxford University Press, 1996). ISBN 0-19-816250-2.
- Volkov, Solomon, tr. Antonina W. Bouis, St. Petersburg: A Cultural History (New York: The Free Press, 1995). ISBN 0-02-874052-1.
- Wilson, Elizabeth, Shostakovich: A Life Remembered, Second Edition (Princeton, New Jersey: Princeton University Press, 1994, 2006). ISBN 0-691-12886-3.
