= Alexander Kopylov =

Russian composer

Alexander Alexandrovich Kopylov or Kopilov (Александр Александрович Копылов, 14 July 1854 – 20 February 1911) was a composer and violinist from the Russian Empire.

Kopylov studied for many years as a chorister and violinist in the Imperial Court Choir, where he would later teach for much of his life. (The Court Choir was modeled after the more famous one in Vienna, known today as the Vienna Boys Choir). He was unable to gain entrance to either of the major conservatories in Russia, but was nevertheless able to study composition privately with Nikolai Rimsky-Korsakov and Anatoly Liadov.

Kopylov gained a reputation as a symphonist and composer of songs. Through his friendship with Rimsky-Korsakov, he became interested in chamber music, writing four string quartets. Wilhelm Altmann, the chamber music scholar and critic, writes in his Handbuch für Streichquartettspieler:

Kopylov's four carefully written string quartets show an outstanding command of proper quartet style. He gives all of the instruments mutually rich parts to play, alternating in exquisite fashion. His excellence is particularly strong in the sparkling themes. He is able to combine the external beauty of form with effective ideas and distinctive harmonies and rhythms.

A copy of his String Quartet No.2 in F, Op.23 (published by Belyayev in 1894), which is conserved at the Cornell University Library, has notations in the margin of the first violin part from a performance with Eugène Ysaÿe.

Kopylov's Symphony in C minor (Op.14) and Concert Overture (Op.31) have been recorded, as have his contributions to some of the Belyayev circle's projects (such as Les Vendredis).
