= Symphony No. 9 (Glazunov) =

Alexander Glazunov's Symphony No. 9 in D minor was begun in 1910, but was still unfinished by the time of his death in 1936. Gavril Yudin orchestrated the first movement piano sketch. The symphony takes about ten minutes to perform in its entirety.

It has been recorded by the Alexander Anissimov and the Moscow Symphony Orchestra for Naxos and José Serebrier and the Royal Scottish National Orchestra for Warner Classics.
