= Stenka Razin (Glazunov) =

Symphonic poem by Alexander Glazunov

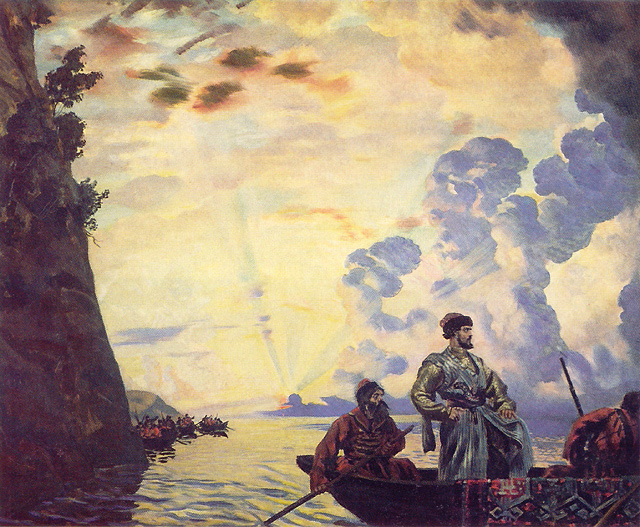
Stepan Razin on the Volga (by Boris Kustodiev, (1918) State Russian Museum in St Petersburg.)

Stenka Razin, Op. 13, is a symphonic poem composed by Alexander Glazunov in 1885. Dedicated to the memory of Alexander Borodin, it is one of the few compositions written by Glazunov on a nationalist subject and is composed in a style reminiscent of Borodin and Pyotr Ilyich Tchaikovsky.

Glazunov's composition dramatizes and romanticizes the career of the Cossack Stenka Razin. After leading raids against the Tsarist regime, Razin was captured and given amnesty in exchange of an oath of allegiance. He broke his promise, leading an army of several hundred thousand in an attempt to overthrow the government. Captured again, he was executed in 1672.

The score focuses on a dramatic moment immediately preceding Razin's recapture. Razin and his mistress, a captured Persian princess, are afloat on a richly caparisoned boat on the River Volga. There, in one version of the story, the princess relates an ominous dream, warning of imminent disaster and her own death in the river. They are suddenly surrounded by tsarist soldiers. Razin casts the princess into the water, declaring, "Never in all my thirty years have I offered a sacrifice to the Volga. Today I will give it what is for me the most precious of all the world's treasures." The Cossacks then descend desperately upon the Russian troops. Another version of the story has Razin's men claiming that his love of the princess has dulled his lust for fighting—a charge Razin counters by drowning the princess before leading his followers once again into battle.

== Structure ==
The slow introduction evokes the River Volga, quoting "The Song of the Volga Boatmen," with the song's solemnity coloring not only the B minor introduction but also the outer sections of the main Allegro con brio in the same musical key. These outer sections depict Razin's raids on villages along the river. A gentler central section (Allegro moderato) features a contrasting clarinet melody in the major a semitone lower and was claimed to be of Persian origin; this theme, sensual and undulating in Russian orientalist fashion, portrays the princess. The two themes, singly and in conjunction, provide the substance for the central development section, culminating in the graphic depiction of the princess's death. "The Song of the Volga Boatmen" is reprised in the brass to bring the work to a rousing conclusion.

== Premiere ==
The work was premiered in St. Petersburg on November 23, 1885 in a concert, arranged at Mitrofan Belyayev's expense, conducted by the Rimsky-Korsakov pupil Georgi Ottonovich Dutsch.

== Bibliography ==
- ed. Ewen, David, The Complete Book of Classical Music (Englewood Cliffs, New Jersey: Prentice-Hall, 1965). Library of Congress Catalog Number 65–11033. ISBN n/a.
- Grier, Christopher, notes for Chandos 8479, Rimsky-Korsakov: Scheherazade; Glazunov: Stenka Razin; Scottish National Orchestra conducted by Neeme Järvi.
- Maes, Francis, tr. Arnold J. Pomerans and Erica Pomerans, A History of Russian Music: From Kamarinskaya to Babi Yar (Berkeley, Los Angeles and London: University of California Press, 2002). ISBN 0-520-21815-9.
