= Symphony No. 2 (Glazunov) =

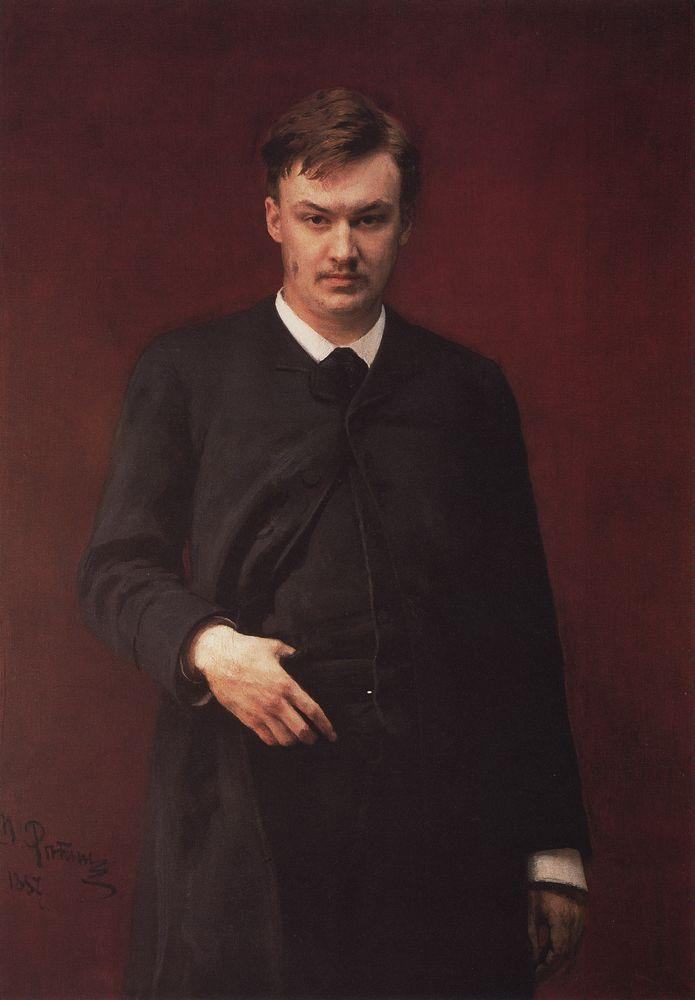
Portrait of Alexander Glazunov by Ilya Repin, 1887

The Symphony No. 2 in F♯ minor, Op. 16, was composed by Alexander Glazunov in 1884–86, premiered in 1886 in St Petersburg, and published in 1889. It is dedicated to the memory of Franz Liszt.

It is in four movements:

1. Andante maestoso – Allegro
2. Andante
3. Scherzo. Allegro
4. Finale. Intrada – Andante sostenuto – Allegro
