= Mitrofan Belyayev =

Russian music publisher

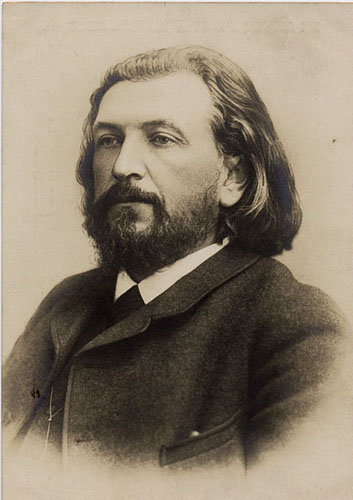
Mitrofan Belyayev c. 1880

Mitrofan Petrovich Belyayev (Russian: Митрофа́н Петро́вич Беля́ев; old style 10/22 February 1836, St. Petersburg – 22 December 1903/ 4 January 1904) was a Russian music publisher, philanthropist, and the owner of a large wood dealership enterprise in Russia. He was also the founder of the Belyayev circle, a society of musicians in Russia whose members included Nikolai Rimsky-Korsakov, Alexander Glazunov and Anatoly Lyadov. His surname is often transliterated as Belaieff or Belayev. In 1886 the Russian painter Ilya Repin made a portrait of Belyayev.

== Biography ==
Belyayev was the son of a rich Russian wood dealer and large land owner. Early on, he was established as a successful buyer in his father's company, whose line he took over after 30 years. His passion, at first private, was however for music.

Belyayev had learned and played violin, viola and piano when in school, and played viola for many years in a string quartet. Later he became a member in a circle of friends in St. Petersburg of chamber musicians, and with the leaders of that time - Anatoly Lyadov and Alexander Borodin - undertook journeys in Russia and abroad to learn more music, among other places to Bayreuth. Belyayev learned several foreign languages, including German.

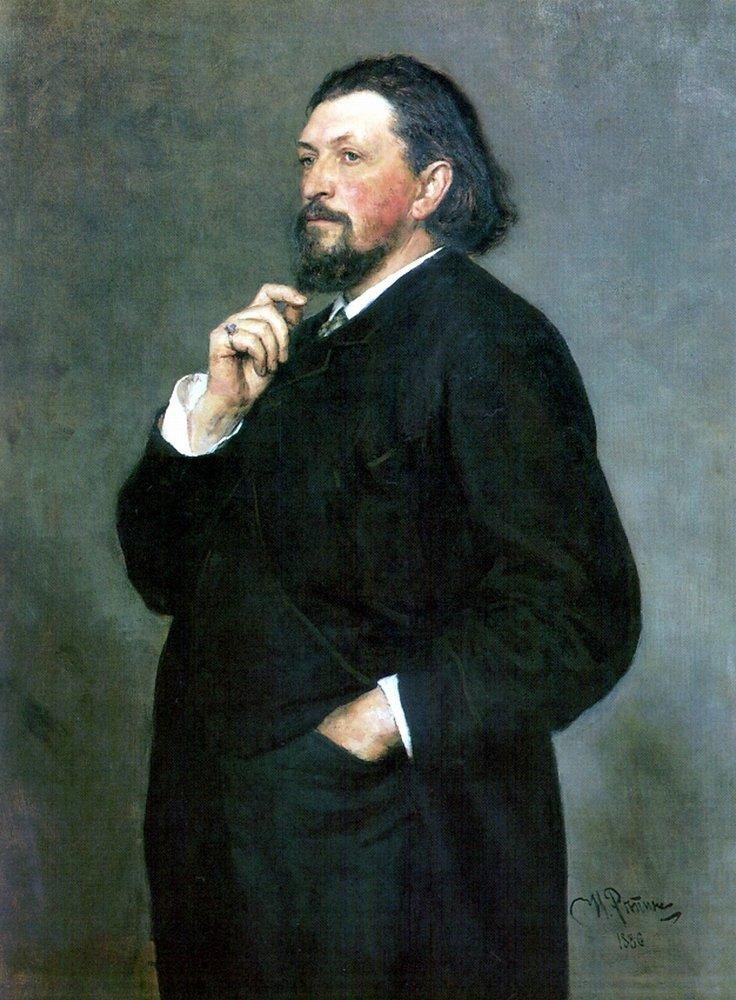
Portrait of M. P. Belyayev by Ilya Repin (1886).

An important event for Belyayev's future and his important role as leader in Russian music life was his meeting in 1882 with the highly talented, scarcely 17-year-old Alexander Glazunov, whose 1st Symphony was premiered at that time. Belyayev's increasing commitment to the promotion of Russian composers led to a gradual retreat from his activity as a wood dealer. In 1884 he became founder of the "Glinka prize", which was awarded annually. In the first years the winners included Borodin, Balakirev, Tchaikovsky, Rimsky-Korsakov, César Cui and Lyadov.

In 1885 Belyayev created the publishing house "M. P. Belaieff" in Leipzig to secure international copyright to Russian composers; until then, international copyright did not extend to music published in Russia. Eventually, he published over 2000 compositions by Russian composers, the first of which was Glazunov's Overture on Greek Themes. The works published there were edited to a high standard, while the authors received higher fees than was usual and kept full control over performance rights. Thus Belyayev made important contributions to the promotion and spreading of Russian music. At first Belyayev selected the works to be produced; later he conferred with a jury, which consisted of Rimsky-Korsakov, Lyadov and Glazunov. Composers from not only St. Petersburg were accepted to the publishing house program, but also rather "western"-oriented Muscovite composers such as Sergei Taneyev and Alexander Scriabin. After the October Revolution the firm continued operations from Leipzig until World War II, when it moved to Bonn. It later relocated to Frankfurt am Main, where in 1971 C. F. Peters took over its management.

In 1885 Belyayev brought the "Russian Symphony Concerts" to St Petersburg, and from 1891 in his house there were weekly "quartet Fridays" ("Les Vendredis") . The composers promoted by Belyayev several times wrote musical contributions both in his honor and to contribute to these occasions. For example, in 1886, for his 50th birthday, Rimsky-Korsakov, Borodin, Lyadov and Glazunov collaborated on a string quartet on the notes B-A-F (Be-la-ef), in 1895, Glazunov, Lyadov and Rimsky-Korsakov composed the three movement 'Jour de fête' or 'Name-Day Quartet', and in 1899, 10 of the group collaborated to compose the Variations on a Russian Theme in G major, and another collection -of 16 movements by 11 of the group- was published under the "Les Vendredis" group name. Another of their joint projects was a set of variations on a Russian theme for piano and orchestra, to which in addition Alexander Kopylov, Nikolay Sokolov and other members of the circle contributed individual movements. (For further details, see Classical music written in collaboration.) The renowned Russian musicologist Alexander Ossovsky maintained close ties with Belyayev's Circle.
