= Symphony No. 1 (Glazunov) =

Symphony composed by Alexander Glazunov

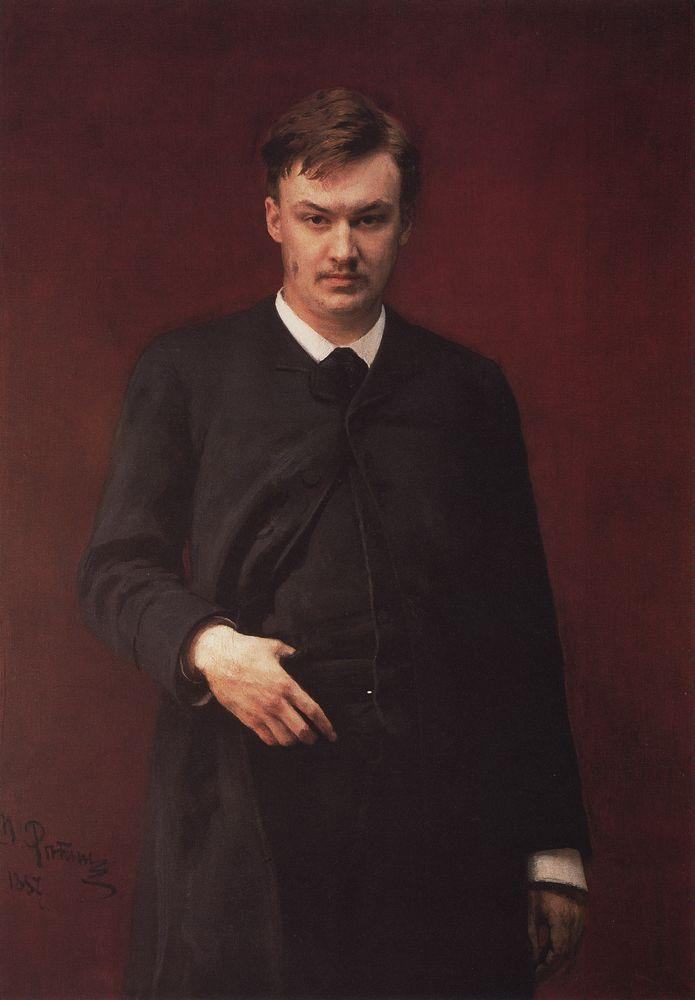
Portrait of Alexander Glazunov by Ilya Repin, 1887

Alexander Glazunov wrote his Symphony No. 1 in E major, Op. 5, in 1881, when he was 16 years old. It was premiered the following year in St. Petersburg. It is known as his Slavonian Symphony.

== Structure ==
The symphony is written in four movements:

1. Allegro
2. Scherzo: Allegro
3. Adagio
4. Finale: Allegro

The symphony bears a strong stylistic semblance to works by Balakirev, Rimsky-Korsakov, and especially Borodin. It was also influenced by Schumann's Rhenish Symphony, a work which was highly regarded in the Balakirev circle.

== Overview ==
While the symphony itself was a resounding success, the audience was even more astonished to see a teenage boy come to the stage to take his bows in his school uniform. This was not the first time Alexander Glazunov had astounded people. He displayed his musical talent early, was discovered by Mily Balakirev (former leader of The Mighty Handful) and further encouraged by his teacher Nikolai Rimsky-Korsakov, who gave him a thorough grounding in counterpoint, form, harmony and orchestration between 1879 and 1881, during which Rimsky-Korsakov wrote in his memoirs that it seemed Glazunov did not progress so much from day to day as from hour to hour. After two years, as Glazunov remembered, Rimsky-Korsakov told his pupil "that henceforth he regarded it as unnecessary to instruct me systematically, in return for payment, as I had already more or less become a mature musician."

Still, some remained skeptical, but not for long. When composer Sergei Taneyev told his friend Pyotr Ilyich Tchaikovsky about the premiere of the First Symphony, Tchaikovsky wrote Balakirev:

Glazunov interests me greatly. Is there any chance that this young man could send me the symphony so that I might take a look at it? I should also like to know whether he completed it, either conceptually or practically, with your or Rimsky-Korsakov's help.

Balakirev replied:

You ask about Glazunov. He is a very talented young man who studied for a year under Rimsky-Korsakov. When he composed his symphony, he did not need any help."

Some months later, Tchaikovsky wrote that he had purchased and studied the score of Glazunov's First String Quartet, concluding that "Glazunov's talent is undeniable."

Truth be told, Glazunov did have a little help from Balakirev, but on just one point. The composer wrote in his memoirs, "I composed and orchestrated the slow movement of the First Symphony in the summer of 1881. In addition I played that passage to Balakirev, who approved of it in general but advised me to add something after the presentation of the two themes, before the repetition of the beginning. From the rhythmic figure that appears in the bars that I added, I created the contrapuntal accompaniment to the first theme, which lent the work a degree of rhythmic vitality. That autumn, the score of the symphony was ready."

== Bibliography ==
- Lobanova, Marina, Notes for BIS CD 1358, Glazunov: Symphony No. 3; Ballade; BBC National Orchestra of Wales conducted by Tadaaki Otaka.
- Lobanova, Marina, Notes for BIS CD 1368, Glazunov: Symphonies No. 1 and No. 6; BBC National Orchestra of Wales conducted by Tadaaki Otaka.
- Taylor, Philip, Notes for Chandos 9751, Glazunov: Symphony No. 1; Violin Concerto; Julia Krasko, violin; State Symphony Capella of Russia conducted by Valeri Polyansky.
