= Alexander Glazunov =

Russian composer (1865–1936)

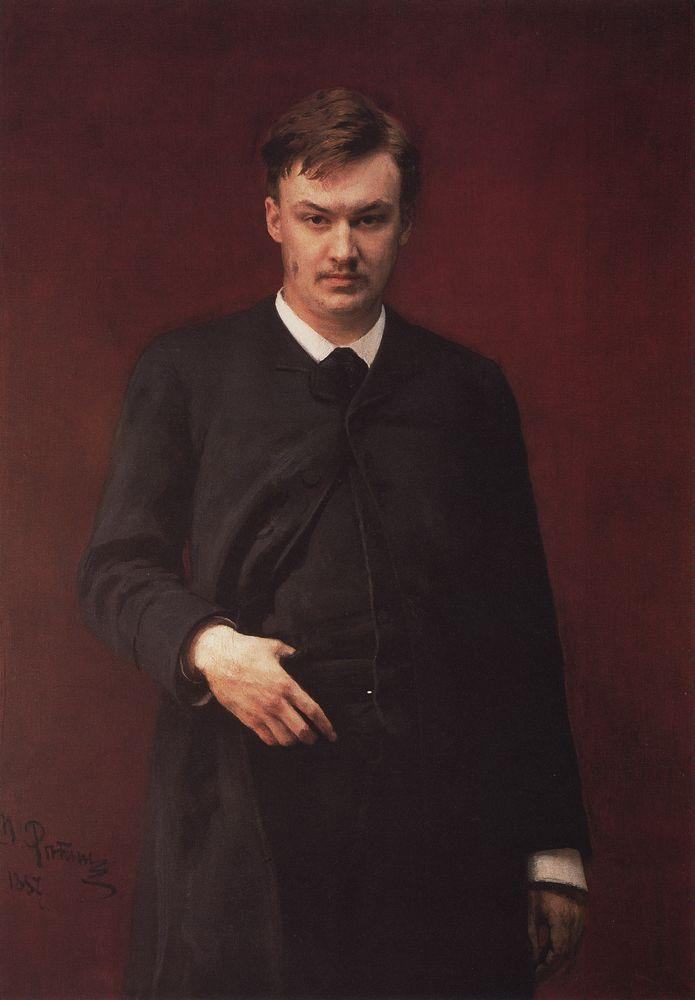
- Portrait of Glazunov by Ilya Repin, 1887
- Born: 10 August 1865; Saint Petersburg, Russia
- Died: 21 March 1936 (aged 70); Neuilly-sur-Seine, France
- Occupations: Composer; Conductor; Conservatory director
- Organizations: Saint Petersburg Conservatory
- Works: List of compositions

Alexander Konstantinovich Glazunov (Note: In this name that follows East Slavic naming customs, the patronymic is Konstantinovich and the family name is Glazunov.) (Note: UK: /ˈɡlæzunɒf/ GLAZ-oo-nof, US: /ˈɡlæzənɒf, ˈɡlɑːz-, -noʊf/ GLA(H)Z-ə-no(h)f; Russian: Алекса́ндр Константи́нович Глазуно́в, romanized: Aleksándr Konstantínovich Glazunóv, IPA: [ɐlʲɪkˈsandr kənstɐnʲˈtʲinəvʲɪdʑ ɡləzʊˈnof]; French: Alexandre Konstantinovitch Glazounov, IPA: [alɛksɑ̃dʁ kɔ̃stɑ̃tinɔvitʃ ɡlazunɔf]; German: Alexander Konstantinowitsch Glasunow, IPA: [alɛkˈsandɐ kɔnstanˈtiːnovɪtʃ ɡlazuˈnɔf].) (10 August [O.S. 29 July] 1865 – 21 March 1936) was a Russian composer, music teacher, and conductor of the late Russian Romantic period. He was director of the Saint Petersburg Conservatory between 1905 and 1928 and was instrumental in reorganizing the institute into the Petrograd Conservatory, then the Leningrad Conservatory, after the Bolshevik Revolution. He continued as head of the Conservatory until 1930, though he had left the Soviet Union in 1928 and did not return. The best-known student under his tenure during the early Soviet years was Dmitri Shostakovich.

Glazunov reconciled nationalism and cosmopolitanism in Russian music. While he was the direct successor to Mily Balakirev's nationalism, he tended more towards Alexander Borodin's epic grandeur while absorbing a number of other influences. These included Nikolai Rimsky-Korsakov's orchestral virtuosity, Pyotr Ilyich Tchaikovsky's lyricism and Taneyev's contrapuntal skill. Younger composers such as Sergei Prokofiev and Shostakovich eventually considered his music old-fashioned, while admitting he retained an imposing reputation and was a stabilizing influence in a time of transition and turmoil.

== Biography ==
=== Prodigy ===
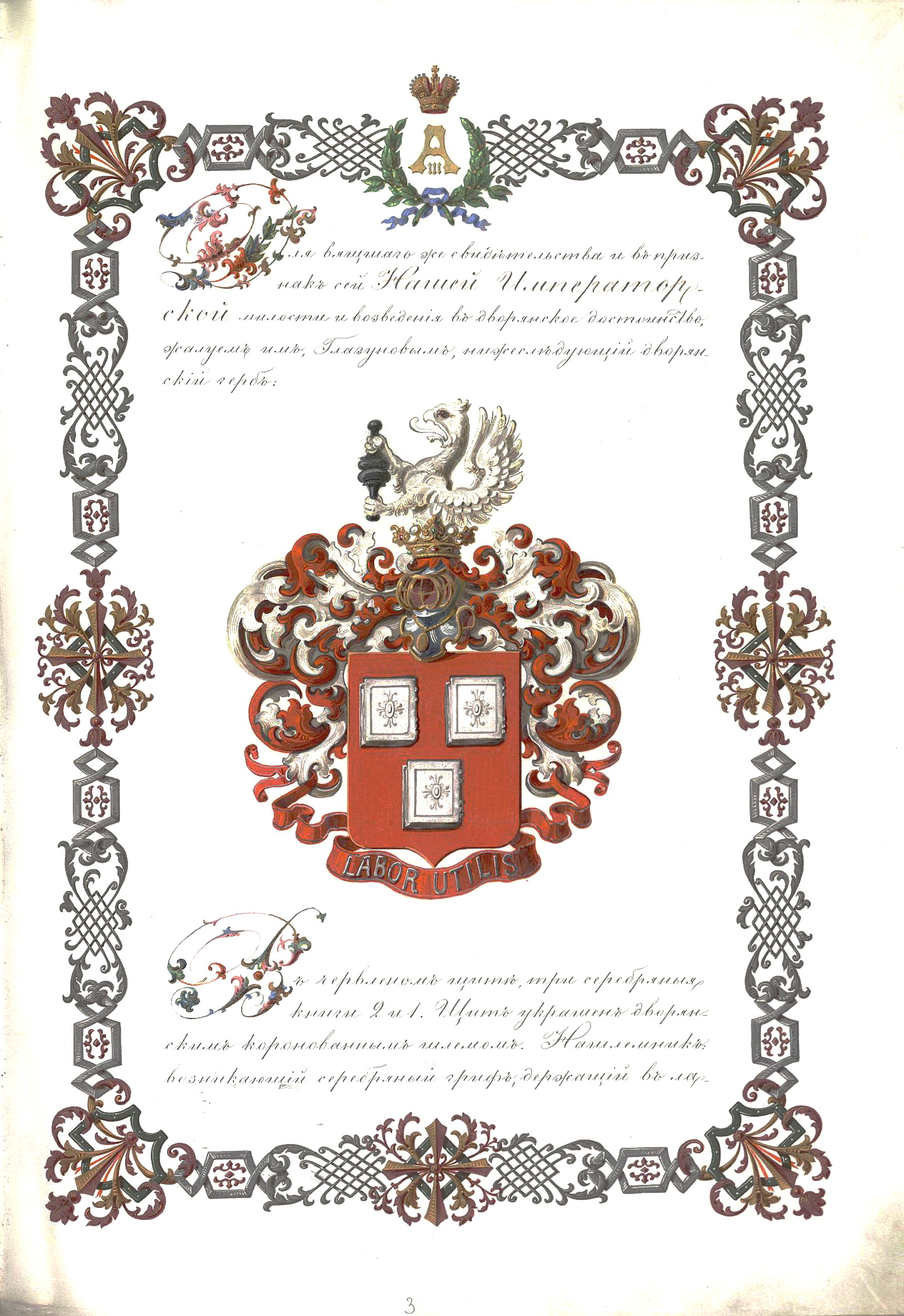
Glazunov family coat of arms

Glazunov was born in Saint Petersburg, the son of a wealthy publisher. His father, Konstantin, was later granted the status of hereditary nobility, in 1882. He began studying piano at age nine and began composing at 11. Balakirev, former leader of the nationalist group "The Five", recognized Glazunov's talent and brought his work to Rimsky-Korsakov's attention. "Casually Balakirev once brought me the composition of a 14- or 15-year-old high-school student, Alexander Glazunov", Rimsky-Korsakov remembered. "It was an orchestral score written in childish fashion. The boy's talent was indubitably clear." Balakirev introduced him to Rimsky-Korsakov shortly afterwards, in December 1879. Rimsky-Korsakov premiered this work in 1882, when Glazunov was 16. Borodin and Vladimir Stasov, among others, lavishly praised both the work and its composer.

Rimsky-Korsakov taught Glazunov as a private student. "His musical development progressed not by the day, but literally by the hour", Rimsky-Korsakov wrote. The nature of their relationship also changed. By the spring of 1881, Rimsky-Korsakov considered Glazunov more a junior colleague than a student. While part of this development may have been from Rimsky-Korsakov's need to find a spiritual replacement for Modest Mussorgsky, who had died that March, it may have also been from observing his progress on the first of Glazunov's eight completed symphonies (he left a ninth unfinished).

=== Mentored by Belyayev ===
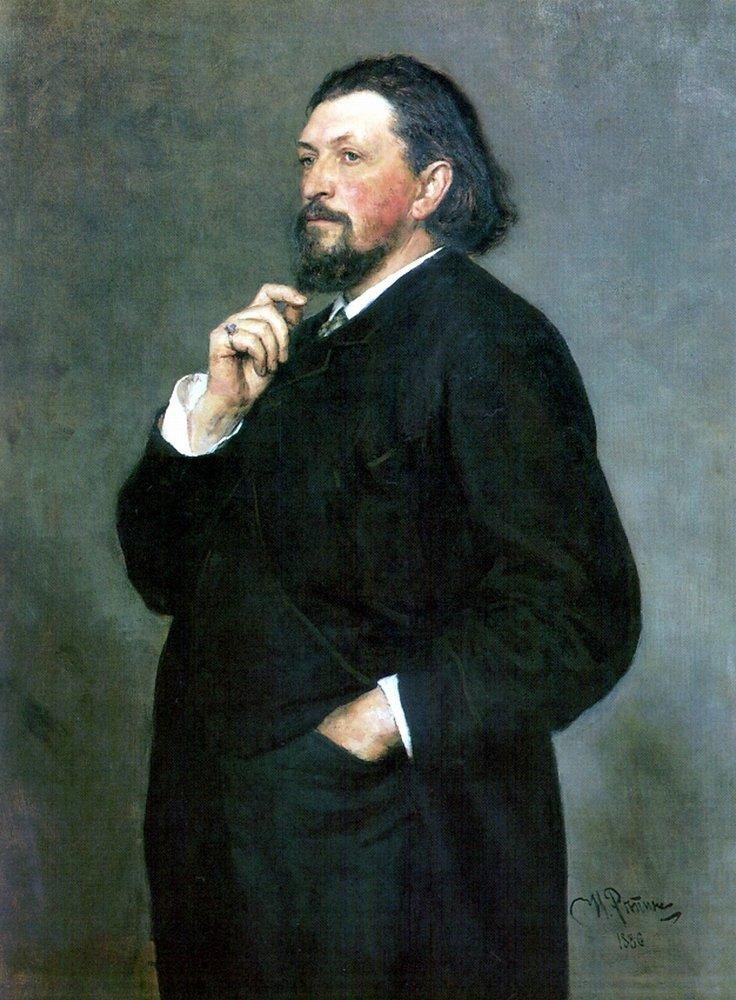
Portrait of Mitrofan Belyayev by Ilya Repin (1886)

More important than this praise was that among the work's admirers was a wealthy timber merchant and amateur musician, Mitrofan Belyayev. Belyayev was introduced to Glazunov's music by Anatoly Lyadov and took a keen interest in the teenager's musical future, then extended that interest to an entire group of nationalist composers. Belyayev took Glazunov to Western Europe in 1884. Glazunov met Franz Liszt in Weimar, where Glazunov's First Symphony was performed.

Also in 1884, Belyayev rented out a hall and hired an orchestra to play Glazunov's First Symphony and an orchestral suite Glazunov had just composed. Buoyed by the success of the rehearsal, Belyayev decided to give a public concert of works by Glazunov and other composers the next season. This project grew into the Russian Symphony Concerts, which were inaugurated during the 1886–87 season.

In 1885 Belyayev started his own publishing house in Leipzig, Germany, initially publishing music by Glazunov, Lyadov, Rimsky-Korsakov and Borodin at his own expense. Young composers started appealing for his help. To help select from their offerings, Belyayev asked Glazunov to serve with Rimsky-Korsakov and Lyadov on an advisory council. The group of composers that formed eventually became known as the Belyayev circle.

=== Fame ===
Glazunov soon enjoyed international acclaim. He emerged from a creative crisis in 1890–91 with new maturity. During the 1890s he wrote three symphonies, two string quartets and a ballet. When he was elected director of the Saint Petersburg Conservatory in 1905, he was at the height of his creative powers. His best works from this period are considered his Eighth Symphony and his Violin Concerto. This was also the time of his greatest international acclaim. He conducted the last of the Russian Historical Concerts in Paris on 17 May 1907, and received honorary Doctor of Music degrees from the universities of Oxford and Cambridge. There were also cycles of all-Glazunov concerts in Saint Petersburg and Moscow to celebrate his 25th anniversary as a composer.

=== Conductor ===
Glazunov made his conducting debut in 1888. In 1889, he conducted his Second Symphony in Paris at the World Exhibition. He was appointed conductor for the Russian Symphony Concerts in 1896. In March of that year he conducted the posthumous premiere of Tchaikovsky's student overture The Storm. In 1897, he led the disastrous premiere of Rachmaninoff's Symphony No 1, which catalysed Rachmaninoff's three-year depression. The composer's wife later claimed that Glazunov seemed drunk at the time. While this cannot be confirmed, it is not implausible for a man who, according to Shostakovich, kept a bottle of alcohol hidden behind his desk and sipped it through a tube during lessons.

Drunk or not, Glazunov had insufficient rehearsal time with the symphony and, while he loved conducting, he never mastered it. From time to time he conducted his own compositions, especially the ballet Raymonda, even though he may have known he had no talent for it. He would sometimes joke, "You can criticize my compositions, but you can't deny that I am a good conductor and a remarkable conservatory director".

Despite the hardships he suffered during World War I and the ensuing Russian Civil War, Glazunov remained active as a conductor. He conducted concerts in factories, clubs and Red Army posts. He played a prominent part in the Russian observation in 1927 of the centenary of Ludwig van Beethoven's death, as both speaker and conductor. After he left Russia, he conducted an evening of his works in Paris in 1928. This was followed by engagements in Portugal, Spain, France, England, Czechoslovakia, Poland, the Netherlands, and the United States.

=== Conservatory ===
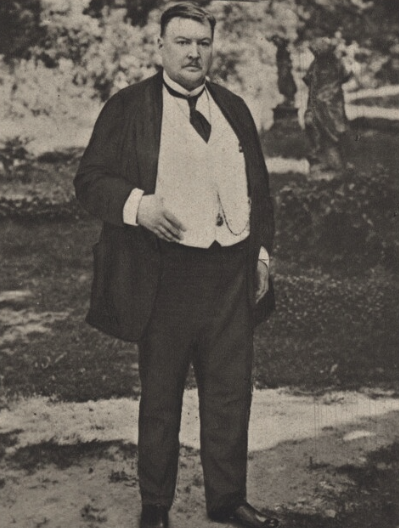
Glazunov in 1928

In 1899, Glazunov became a professor at the Saint Petersburg Conservatory. In the wake of the 1905 Russian Revolution and firing then rehiring of Rimsky-Korsakov that year, Glazunov became its director. He remained so until the revolutionary events of 1917, which culminated on 7 November. His Piano Concerto No. 2 in B major, Op. 100, which he conducted, was premiered at the first concert held in Petrograd after that date. After the end of World War I, he was instrumental in reorganizing the Conservatory—this may, in fact, have been the main reason he waited so long to go into exile. During his tenure he worked tirelessly to improve the curriculum, raise the standards for students and staff, and defend the institute's dignity and autonomy. Among his achievements were an opera studio and a students' philharmonic orchestra.

Glazunov showed paternal concern for the welfare of needy students, such as Shostakovich and Nathan Milstein. Composer Natalia Pravosudovich was also among his students. He personally examined hundreds of students at the end of each academic year, writing brief comments on each.

While Glazunov's sobriety could be questioned, his prestige could not. Because of his reputation, the Conservatory received special status among institutions of higher learning in the aftermath of the October Revolution. Glazunov established a sound working relationship with the Bolshevik regime, especially Anatoly Lunacharsky, the minister of education. Nevertheless, Glazunov's conservatism was attacked within the Conservatory. Increasingly, professors and students demanded methods aligned with communistic ideology. Glazunov saw these demands as both destructive and unjust. Tired of the Conservatory, he took advantage of the opportunity to go abroad in 1928 for the Franz Schubert centenary celebrations in Vienna. He did not return. Maximilian Steinberg ran the Conservatory in his absence until Glazunov resigned in 1930.

=== Emigration ===
Glazunov toured Europe and the United States in 1928, and settled in Paris by 1929. He always claimed he had not returned to Russia out of "ill health"; this enabled him to remain a respected composer in the Soviet Union, unlike Igor Stravinsky and Rachmaninoff, who had left for other reasons. In 1929, he conducted an orchestra of Parisian musicians in the first complete electrical recording of The Seasons. In 1934, he wrote his Saxophone Concerto, a virtuoso and lyrical work for the alto saxophone.

=== Married life ===
In 1929, at age 64, Glazunov married the 54-year-old Olga Nikolayevna Gavrilova (1875–1968). In 1928, Olga's daughter Elena Gavrilova had been the soloist in the first Paris performance of his Piano Concerto No. 2 in B major, Op. 100. He subsequently adopted Elena (she is sometimes referred to as his stepdaughter), who then used the name Elena Glazunova. In 1928, Elena had married the pianist Sergei Tarnowsky, who managed Glazunov's professional and business affairs in Paris, such as negotiating his United States appearances with Sol Hurok. (Tarnowsky was also a noted piano teacher, whose students included Vladimir Horowitz.) Elena later appeared as Elena Gunther-Glazunova after her second marriage, to Herbert Gunther.

=== Death ===
Glazunov died in Neuilly-sur-Seine (near Paris) in 1936, aged 70. In 1972 his remains were reinterred at the Alexander Nevsky Monastery in Leningrad.

== Works and influence ==
Chant du ménestrel, Op. 71
Performed by the Skidmore College Orchestra

Glazunov's most popular works are his ballets The Seasons and Raymonda, some of his later symphonies, particularly the Fourth, Fifth and Sixth, the Polonaise from Les Sylphides, and his two Concert Waltzes. His Violin Concerto, a favorite vehicle for Jascha Heifetz, is still sometimes played and recorded. His last work, the Saxophone Concerto (1934), showed his ability to adapt to Western fashions in music at that time.

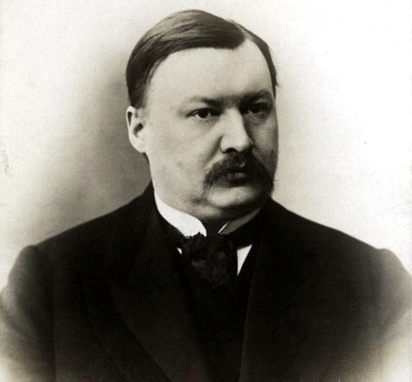
Glazunov before 1913

Glazunov's musical development was paradoxical. He was adopted as an idol by nationalist composers who had been largely self-taught and, apart from Rimsky-Korsakov, were deeply distrustful of academic technique. Glazunov's first two symphonies could be seen as an anthology of nationalist techniques as practiced by Balakirev and Borodin; the same could be said for his symphonic poem Stenka Razin with its use of the folk song "Song of the Volga Boatmen" and orientalist practices much like those employed by The Five. By his early 20s he realized the polemic battles between academicism and nationalism were no longer valid. Although he based his compositions on Russian popular music, Glazunov's technical mastery allowed him to write in a sophisticated, cultured idiom. With his Third Symphony, he consciously attempted to internationalize his music in a manner similar to Tchaikovsky, to whom the piece is dedicated.

The Third Symphony was a transitional work. Glazunov admitted its composition caused him a great deal of trouble. With the Fourth Symphony, he came into his mature style. Dedicated to Anton Rubinstein, the Fourth was written as a deliberately cosmopolitan work by a Russian looking outward to the West, yet it remained unmistakably Russian in tone. He continued to synthesize nationalist tradition and Western technique in the Fifth Symphony. By the time Glazunov wrote his Seventh Symphony, his duties at the Conservatory had slowed his rate of composition. After his Eighth Symphony, his heavy drinking may have started taking a toll on his creativity. He sketched one movement of a Ninth Symphony but left the work unfinished.

Glazunov wrote three ballets; eight symphonies and many other orchestral works; five concertos (2 for piano; 1 for violin; 1 for cello; 1 for saxophone); seven string quartets; two piano sonatas and other piano pieces; miscellaneous instrumental pieces; and some songs. He also collaborated with the choreographer Michel Fokine to create the ballet Les Sylphides, a suite of music by Frédéric Chopin orchestrated by Glazunov.

Sergei Diaghilev briefly considered Glazunov to compose the music for his ballet The Firebird after failing to interest his first choice, Anatol Lyadov, before commissioning Stravinsky instead.

=== Glazunov and Stravinsky ===
In his 1935 autobiography, Stravinsky wrote that, as a young man, he greatly admired Glazunov's perfection of musical form, purity of counterpoint and assured writing. At 15, Stravinsky transcribed one of Glazunov's string quartets for piano solo. He also deliberately modeled his Symphony in E♭, Op. 1, on Glazunov's symphonies, which were then in vogue. He used Glazunov's Eighth Symphony, Op. 83, which was written in the same key as his, as a pattern on which to base corrections to his symphony.

This attitude changed over time. In his memoir, Stravinsky called Glazunov one of the most disagreeable men he had ever met, adding that the only bad omen he had experienced about the initial (private) performance of his symphony was Glazunov having come to him afterwards saying, "Very nice, very nice." Stravinsky later amended his recollection of this incident, adding that when Glazunov passed him in the aisle after the performance, he told Stravinsky, "Rather heavy instrumentation for such music." (Note: Glazunov was not the only one to comment on heaviness in the orchestration. Rimsky-Korsakov, under whose supervision Stravinsky had written the symphony, reportedly told his young student, "This is too heavy; be more careful when you use trombones in the middle register.")

For his part, Glazunov was not supportive of the modern direction Stravinsky's music took. He was not alone in this prejudice—their mutual teacher Rimsky-Korsakov was as profoundly conservative by the end of his life, wedded to the academic process he helped instill at the Conservatory. Unlike Rimsky-Korsakov, Glazunov was not anxious about the potential dead end Russian music might reach by following academia strictly, nor did he share Rimsky-Korsakov's grudging respect for new ideas and techniques.

Chances are that Glazunov treated Stravinsky with reserve, certainly not open rudeness. His opinion of Stravinsky's music in the presence of others was another matter. At the performance of Feu d'artifice (Fireworks), he reportedly made the comment, "Kein Talent, nur Dissonanz" ("no talent, just dissonance"). (Also in the audience was Diaghilev, who on the strength of this music sought Stravinsky out for the Ballets Russes.) Glazunov eventually considered Stravinsky merely an expert orchestrator. In 1912 he told Vladimir Telyakovsky, "Petrushka is not music, but is excellently and skillfully orchestrated."

=== Glazunov and Shostakovich ===
Dmitri Shostakovich entered the Petrograd Conservatory at age 13, becoming the youngest student there. He studied piano with Leonid Nikolayev and composition with Rimsky-Korsakov's son-in-law Maximilian Steinberg. He was a disciplined, hard-working student. Glazunov may have recognized in Shostakovich an echo of his younger self. He carefully monitored his progress in Steinberg's class and, in awarding him his doctorate, recommended Shostakovich for a higher degree that normally would have led to a professorship. Due to his family's financial hardship, Shostakovich was not able to take advantage of this opportunity. Glazunov also arranged for the premiere of Shostakovich's First Symphony on 12 May 1926 with the Leningrad Philharmonic under Nikolai Malko. This was 44 years after Glazunov's First Symphony had first been presented in the same hall. In another instance of déjà vu with Glazunov's early life, the symphony caused almost as big a sensation as the appearance of the 19-year-old Shostakovich on the stage awkwardly taking his bow.

== Sources ==
- Ossovsky, Alexander, Aleksandr Konstantinovich Glazunov: His life and creative work; Sanct-Petersburg, Alexander Siloti Concerts Publishing House, 1907.
- Figes, Orlando, Natasha's Dance: A Cultural History of Russia (New York: Metropolitan Books, 2002). ISBN 978-0-8050-5783-6 (hc.).
- Huth, Andrew, Notes for Warner 61434, Glazunov: Symphony No. 5; The Seasons; Royal Scottish National Orchestra conducted by José Serebrier.
- Huth, Andrew, Notes for Warner 61939, Glazunov: Symphony No. 8; Raymonda; Royal Scottish National Orchestra conducted by José Serebrier.
- Huth, Andrew, Notes for Warner 63236, Glazunov: Symphonies Nos. 4 and 7; Royal Scottish National Orchestra conducted by José Serebrier.
- MacDonald, Ian, The New Shostakovich (Boston: Northeastern University Press, 1990). ISBN 978-1-55553-089-1.
- Rimsky-Korsakov, Nikolai, Letoppis Moyey Muzykalnoy Zhizni (Saint Petersburg, 1909), published in English as My Musical Life (New York: Knopf, 1925, 3rd ed. 1942). ISBN n/a.
- Norris, Geoffrey and Marina Frolova-Walker, "Glazunov, Aleksandr Konstantinovich" in New Grove
- Schwarz, Boris, "Glazunov, Aleksandr Konstantinovich" in New Grove
- Taylor, Philip, Notes for Chandos 9751, Glazunov: Symphony No. 1, "Slavyanskaya"; Violin Concerto; Julie Krasko, violin; Russian State Symphony Orchestra conducted by Valery Polyansky.
- Volkov, Solomon, tr. Bouis, Antonina W., Testimony: The Memoirs of Dmitri Shostakovich (New York: The Free Press, a division of Simon & Schuster, Inc., 1995). ISBN 978-0-02-874052-2.
- Volkov, Solomon, tr. Bouis, Antonina W., Saint Petersburg: A Cultural History (New York: Harper & Row, 1979). ISBN 978-0-06-014476-0.
- Walsh, Stephen, Stravinsky, A Creative Spring: Russia and France, 1882–1934 (New York: Alfred A. Knopf, 1999). ISBN 978-0-679-41484-1.
- White, Eric Walter, Stravinsky: The Man and His Works (Berkeley and Los Angeles: University of California Press, 1966). Library of Congress Card Catalog Number 66-27667.
