= Piano Sonata in B minor =

Piano Sonata in B minor may refer to:

- Piano Sonata No. 3 (Chopin)
- Piano Sonata in B minor (Liszt)
- Piano Sonata No. 2 (Shostakovich)
- Piano Sonata in B minor (Strauss)

== See also ==
- Sonata in B minor (disambiguation)
- String Quartet in B minor (disambiguation)
- List of symphonies in B minor
