= Night on Bald Mountain =

Composition by Modest Mussorgsky

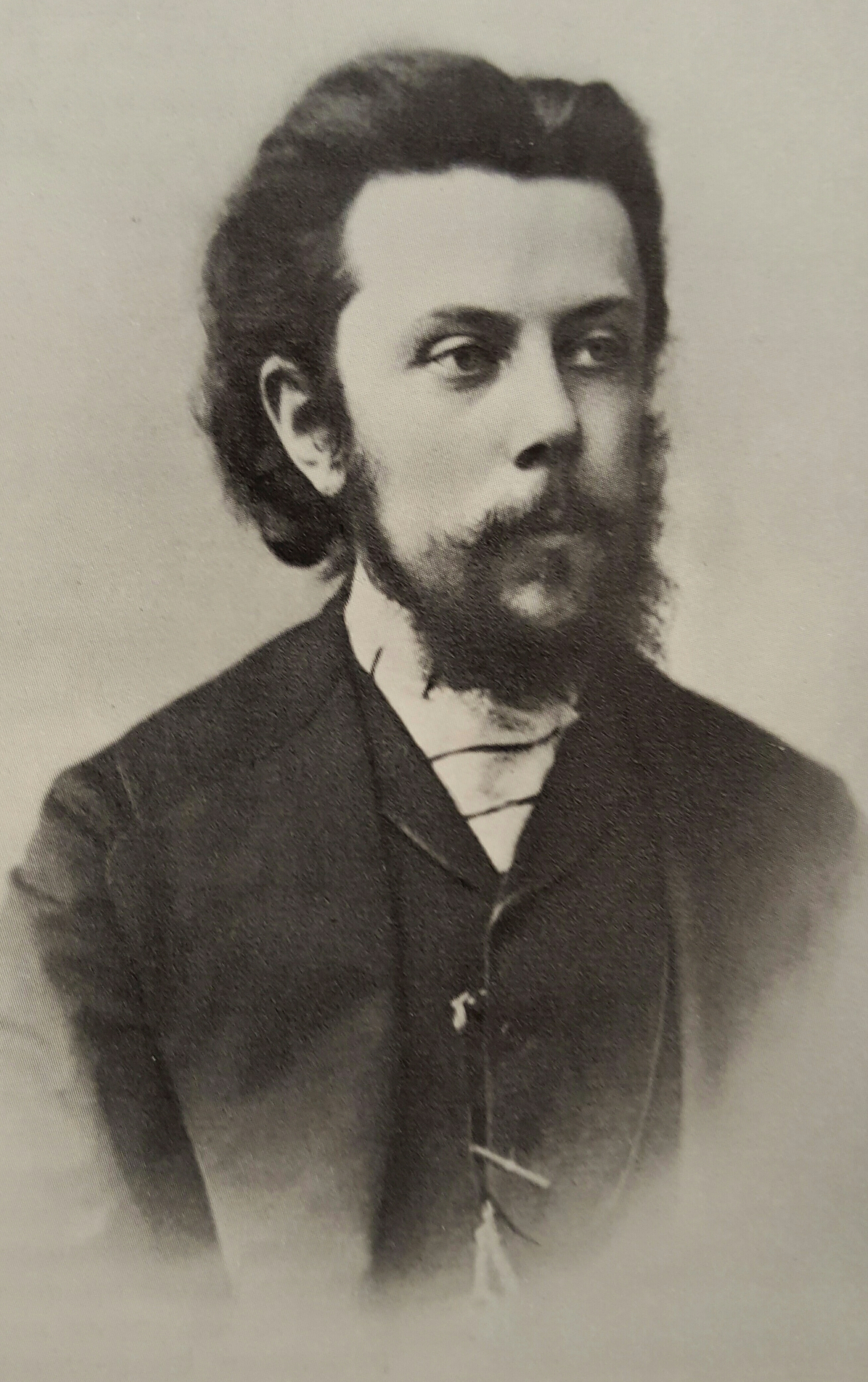
Modest Mussorgsky, 1865

Night on Bald Mountain (Russian: Ночь на лысой горе, romanized: Noch′ na lysoy gore), also known as Night on the Bare Mountain, is a series of compositions by Modest Mussorgsky (1839–1881). Inspired by Russian literary works and legend, Mussorgsky composed a "musical picture", St. John's Eve on Bald Mountain (Russian: Иванова ночь на лысой горе, romanized: Ivanova noch′ na lysoy gore) on the theme of a Witches' Sabbath occurring at Bald Mountain on St. John's Eve, which he completed on that very night, 23 June 1867. Together with Nikolai Rimsky-Korsakov's Sadko (1867), it is one of the first tone poems by a Russian composer.

Although Mussorgsky was proud of his youthful effort, his mentor, Mily Balakirev, refused to perform it. To salvage what he considered worthy material, Mussorgsky attempted to insert his Bald Mountain music, recast for vocal soloists, chorus, and orchestra, into two subsequent projects—the collaborative opera-ballet Mlada (1872), and the opera The Fair at Sorochyntsi (1880). However, Night on Bald Mountain was never performed in any form during Mussorgsky's lifetime.

In 1886, five years after Mussorgsky's death, Rimsky-Korsakov published an arrangement of the work, described as a "fantasy for orchestra." Some musical scholars consider this version to be an original composition of Rimsky-Korsakov, albeit one based on Mussorgsky's last version of the music, for The Fair at Sorochyntsi:

I need hardly remind the reader that the orchestral piece universally known as 'Mussorgsky's Night on the Bare Mountain' is an orchestral composition by Rimsky-Korsakov based on the later version of the Bare Mountain music which Mussorgsky prepared for Sorochintsy Fair.Calvocoressi & Abraham 1974, p. 175

— Gerald Abraham, musicologist and an authority on Mussorgsky, 1945

It is through Rimsky-Korsakov's version that Night on Bald Mountain achieved lasting fame. Premiering in Saint Petersburg in 1886, the work became a concert favourite. Half a century later, the work obtained perhaps its greatest exposure through the Walt Disney animated film Fantasia (1940), featuring an arrangement by Leopold Stokowski, based on Rimsky-Korsakov's version. Mussorgsky's tone poem was not published in its original form until 1968.

== Name ==
The original Russian title of the tone poem, Иванова ночь на лысой горе, translates literally as Saint John's Eve on Bald Mountain, usually shortened to Night on Bald Mountain. However, due to several ambiguities, the composition is also known by a number of alternative titles in English.

The Russian word "ночь" (noch′) is literally "night" in English, but idiomatically this would refer to the night following St. John's Day, variously observed between 21 June (the summer solstice) and 25 June. The night before St. John's Day is usually referred to as "St. John's Eve" in English; Russian does not make this distinction.

Bald Mountain is the most familiar translation of "лысой горе" (lysoy gore) in English, and is also the most literal. The adjective "bald" is commonly used in English place names for barren hills, mountains, and other features, and so is also idiomatic. However, because the most familiar use of "bald" describes hairlessness, this part of the title is also known as "Bare Mountain". The use of "bald" to describe barren landscapes is common in European languages. In French, the piece is known as Une nuit sur le mont Chauve and in Italian Una Notte sul Monte Calvo (A Night on Bald Mountain).

Some performances of the work also insert the article "the" before "Bald Mountain" or "Bare Mountain". Articles are not used in Russian, but are often applied to nouns when translating Russian into languages that regularly use articles, such as English and French. However, because the title of the work refers to a specific place called "Bald Mountain", an article would not normally be used in English.

== Early unrealized projects ==
=== Opera project: St. John's Eve (1858) ===
A sheet of paper apparently found among Mussorgsky's manuscripts contains the following statement:

Program of the opera St. John's Night, in three acts, after the tale by Gogol, written by P. Boborïkin, in the presence and with the help of Modest Mussorgsky, Yevgeniy Mussorgsky, and Vasiliy. Witness to the proceedings: Mily Balakirev.

This curious fragment, dated 25 December 1858, has been interpreted as an indication of Mussorgsky's intent to write an opera on the subject of Gogol's short story St. John's Eve (Russian: Вечер накануне Ивана Купала, Vecher nakanune Ivana Kupala, St. John's Eve). Gogol's tale contains the elements of witchcraft common to other stories in the Evenings on a Farm near Dikanka collection, but does not feature a Witches' Sabbath. No further plans for this project were mentioned.

=== Opera project: The Witch (1860) ===
The theme of a witches' sabbath, the central theme in all subsequent Night on Bald Mountain projects, appears to have been derived from the nonextant play The Witch (Russian: Ведьма, Ved′ma) by Baron Georgiy Mengden, a military friend of the composer. In 1860 Mussorgsky informed Balakirev that he had been commissioned to write one act of an opera on this subject:

I have also received some very interesting work which must be prepared for the coming summer. This work is: a whole act on The Bald Mountain (from Mengden's drama The Witch), a witches' sabbath, separate episodes of sorcerers, a ceremonial march of all this rubbish, a finale—glory to the sabbath... The libretto is very good. There are already some materials, perhaps a very good thing will come of it.

— Modest Mussorgsky, letter to Balakirev, 26 September 1860

However, as with the previous project, it is unknown whether any materials were written down, and, if so, whether they were transferred to subsequent projects.

== Tone poem: St. John's Eve on Bald Mountain (1867) ==
=== Composition history ===
In 1866 Mussorgsky wrote to Balakirev expressing a desire to discuss his plans for The Witches, his informal name for his Bald Mountain music. In early June 1867, he began composing the orchestral version of the piece. The score is inscribed with the following details:

Conceived in 1866. Began to write for orchestra 12 June 1867, completed work on the eve of St. John's Day, 23 June 1867, in Luga District on Minkino Farm. Modest Mussorgskiy.

Russian original: Задумана в 1866 году. Начал писать на оркестр 12-го июня 1867 года, окончил работу в Канун Иванова дня 23 июня 1867 года в Лугском уезде на Мызе Минкино. Модест Мусоргский

Mussorgsky described the piece in a letter to Vladimir Nikolsky:

So far as my memory doesn't deceive me, the witches used to gather on this mountain, ... gossip, play tricks and await their chief—Satan. On his arrival they, i.e. the witches, formed a circle round the throne on which he sat, in the form of a kid, and sang his praise. When Satan was worked up into a sufficient passion by the witches' praises, he gave the command for the sabbath, in which he chose for himself the witches who caught his fancy. So this is what I've done. At the head of my score I've put its content: 1. Assembly of the witches, their talk and gossip; 2. Satan's journey; 3. Obscene praises of Satan; and 4. Sabbath ... The form and character of the composition are Russian and original ... I wrote St. John's Eve quickly, straight away in full score, I wrote it in about twelve days, glory to God ... While at work on St. John's Eve I didn't sleep at night and actually finished the work on the eve of St. John's Day, it seethed within me so, and I simply didn't know what was happening within me ... I see in my wicked prank an independent Russian product, free from German profundity and routine, and, like Savishna, grown on our native fields and nurtured on Russian bread.

He also stated—incorrectly, as it turned out—that he would never re-model it: "with whatever shortcomings, it is born; and with them it must live if it is to live at all." Having finally completed the work, Mussorgsky was crushed when his mentor Mily Balakirev was savagely critical of it. The score is peppered with comments such as "the devil knows what [this is]", "what rubbish", and "this might be of use", probably pencilled in by Balakirev. This "first version" was put aside, and did not appear in print until 1968, in a new edition prepared by Georgiy Kirkor.

=== Performance history ===
The original tone poem, St. John's Eve on Bald Mountain (1867), was not performed until the 20th century. Musicologist Aleksandra Orlova claims that the original manuscript of this version was discovered in the library of the Leningrad Conservatory by musicologist Georgiy Orlov in the late 1920s, that it was performed once by the Leningrad Philharmonic Society, and that Nikolay Malko brought along a copy of it when he emigrated to the West. Gerald Abraham states that this version was performed by Malko on 3 February 1932, apparently in England.Calvocoressi & Abraham 1974, p. 175 Michel-Dimitri Calvocoressi claims that Malko performed this version in several countries in 1933.

=== Instrumentation ===
- Woodwinds: piccolo, 2 flutes, 2 oboes, 2 clarinets, 2 bassoons
- Brass: 4 horns, 2 cornets, 2 trumpets, 3 trombones, tuba
- Percussion: timpani, bass drum, cymbals, tambourine, triangle, snare drum, tam-tam
- Strings: violins I & II, violas, cellos, double basses

=== Program ===
==== Setting ====
Russian legend tells of a witches' sabbath taking place on St. John's Night (23–24 June) on the Lysa Hora (Bald Mountain), near Kiev.

==== Program ====
The following program is taken from the score:

Seq.	Original	Transliteration	English
1	Сбор ведьм, их толки и сплетни	Sbor ved′m, ikh tolki i spletni	Assembly of the witches, their chatter and gossip
2	Поезд Сатаны	Poyezd Satany	Satan's cortege
3	Чёрная служба (Messe noire)	Chyornaya sluzhba (Messe noire)	Black mass
4	Шабаш	Shabash	Sabbath

=== Recordings ===
- 1961, Lovro von Matacic, Philharmonia Orchestra
- 1962, Francesco Mander, Orchestra Sinfonica Torino
- 1971, David Lloyd-Jones, London Philharmonic Orchestra
- 1980, Claudio Abbado, London Symphony Orchestra
- 1988, John Williams, Boston Pops Orchestra
- 1991, Christoph von Dohnányi, Cleveland Orchestra
- 1991, Dmitriy Kitayenko, Bergen Philharmonic Orchestra
- 1993, Claudio Abbado, Berliner Philharmoniker
- 2001, Peter Richard Conte, transcribed for the Wanamaker Organ
- 2003, Theodore Kuchar, National Symphony Orchestra of Ukraine
- 2004, Valery Gergiev, BBC Symphony Orchestra
- 2006, Esa-Pekka Salonen, Los Angeles Philharmonic
- 2011, Kirill Karabits, Bournemouth Symphony Orchestra
- 2016, Gustavo Dudamel, Weiner Philharmoniker

== Glorification of Chernobog from Mlada (1872) ==
=== Composition history ===
The first re-modelling of the tone poem took place in 1872, when Mussorgsky revised and recast it for vocal soloists, chorus, and orchestra as part of act 3 that he was assigned to contribute to the collaborative opera-ballet Mlada. In this new version the music was to form the basis of the Night on Mount Triglav (Russian: Ночь на горе Триглаве, Noch′ na gore Triglave) scene.

Mussorgsky referred to this piece under the title Glorification of Chernobog (Russian: Славленье Чёрнобога, Slavlenye Chornoboga) in a list of his compositions given to Vladimir Stasov. In 1930, Pavel Lamm, in his edition of Mussorgsky's complete works, referred to the piece as Worship of the Black Goat (Russian: Служение чёрному козлу, Sluzheniye chornomy kozlu).

Mlada was a project doomed to failure, however, and this "second version" languished along with the first. The score of Glorification of Chernobog has not survived, and was never published or performed.

=== Program ===
The following scenario is taken from Rimsky-Korsakov's later "magic opera-ballet" Mlada (1890), based on the same libretto by Viktor Krïlov.

==== Setting ====
Mlada is set in the 9th or 10th century city of Retra, in the (formerly) Slavic lands between the Baltic Sea coast and the Elbe River. This would be the land of the pre-Christian Polabian Slavs, in the region corresponding to the modern German areas of Holstein, Mecklenburg, or Vorpommern.

The Mlada scenario is the only Bald Mountain setting that mentions a "Mt. Triglav", where the supernatural events of act 3 take place. The name Triglav (tri three + glav head) happens to be the name of an ancient three-headed Slavic deity or a trinity of deities, and is also the name of a famous peak in Slovenia, which is, however, some 750 km (470 miles) distant.

==== Plot ====
Voyslava and her father Mstivoy, the Prince of Retra, have poisoned Mlada, the betrothed of Yaromir, Prince of Arkona. Voyslava sells her soul to Morena, an evil goddess, to obtain her aid in making Yaromir forget Mlada so she may have him to herself. In act 3, the shade (ghost) of Mlada leads Yaromir up the slopes of Mount Triglav to a pine wood in a gorge on top of the mountain. Mlada's shade joins a gathering of the spirits of the dead. She expresses in mime to Yaromir the wish to be reunited with him in the kingdom of dead souls. He is eager to join her. However, there is a rumbling sound announcing the appearance, apparently from underground, of the following fantastic characters (many of whom also appear in Dream Vision of the Peasant Lad from The Fair at Sorochyntsi, described below):

Russian	Transliteration	Description
Злые духи	Zlyye dukhi	Evil spirits
Ведьмы	Ved′my	Witches
Кикиморы	Kikimory	Female hobgoblins
Чёрнобог	Chyornobog	Cherno (black) + bog (god), an infernal Slavic deity, in the form of a goat
Морена	Morena	An infernal Slavic deity
Кащей	Kashchey	An ogre familiar from Russian folktales; plays a gusli
Червь	Cherv′	Worm, god of famine
Чума	Chuma	Plague, god of pestilence
Топелец	Topelets	'Drowner', god of floods

The evil spirits sing in a strange demonic language, in the manner of the "demons and the damned" of Hector Berlioz's La damnation de Faust. Morena calls on Chernobog to help make Yaromir forsake Mlada. Kashchey determines that Morena and Chernobog will be successful if Yaromir is seduced by another. Chernobog commands Yaromir's soul to separate from his body, and for Queen Cleopatra to appear. Instantly the scene changes to a hall in Egypt, where the shade of Cleopatra attempts to entice Yaromir's soul to her side with a seductive dance. She almost succeeds in doing so when a cock crow announcing the break of day causes the entire infernal host to vanish. Yaromir awakens and ponders the mysterious events he has witnessed.

== Dream Vision of the Peasant Lad from The Fair at Sorochyntsi (1880) ==
=== Composition history ===
The work's "third version", the Dream Vision of the Peasant Lad (Russian: Сонное видение паробка, Sonnoye videniye parobka), was composed eight years later when Mussorgsky revived and revised the second version to function as a "dream intermezzo" in his opera The Fair at Sorochyntsi (1874–80), a work which was still incomplete at the time of his death in 1881. Mussorgsky's piano-vocal score is dated 10 May 1880.

Mussorgsky originally chose the end of act 1 of the opera as the location for his choral intermezzo. It is now generally performed in the Shebalin version (1930) of the opera, where it is relocated to act 3, just after a partial reprise of the peasant lad's dumka. The theme of the dumka also serves as one of the main themes of the new quiet ending.

=== Performance history ===
The Dream Vision of the Peasant Lad was first performed as part of Vissarion Shebalin's performing edition of The Fair at Sorochyntsi, which premiered in 1931 in Leningrad at the Maly Theater, conducted by Samuil Samosud. Shebalin's orchestration was published by Muzgiz (IMSLP) in 1934.

=== Program ===
==== Setting ====
The Fair at Sorochyntsi is set in and around the Ukrainian village of Velyki Sorochyntsi, some 500 kilometers east of Kiev and the famous "Bald Mountain" (Lysa Hora), in the year 1800.

==== Plot ====
The peasant Solopiy Cherevik, his domineering wife Khivrya, and pretty daughter Parasya are visiting the Sorochyntsi Fair. Parasya is wooed by Gritsko Golopupenko, the "peasant lad" of the title. Gritsko desires Cherevik's consent to marry his daughter. Although Cherevik is not against the match, his wife objects because Gritsko had thrown mud in her face on the way to the fair. Gritsko strikes a bargain with a gypsy to assist him in winning Parasya. They exploit the superstitious fears of the fairgoers, who believe that the location of the fair this year is ill-chosen, it being the haunt of a devil who was thrown out of hell, took to drinking, went broke, pawned his jacket, and has returned to claim it. After various pranks and comic circumstances, Gritsko achieves his goal and all ends happily.

At the end of act 1, Gritsko falls asleep some distance from the fair, and, because there has been talk of devilry, has a dream of a witches' sabbath. The following remarks are taken from the score (page numbers supplied):

Act 1, scene 2 – "Dream Vision of the Peasant Lad" (Intermezzo)

p. 1) A hilly desolate area. An approaching subterranean choir of infernal forces. The curtain rises. The peasant lad sleeps at the foot of a hill.
p. 3) Witches and devils surround the sleeping peasant lad.
p. 5) On a hill appear fiery serpents. The approach of Chernobog. Chernobog rises from underground. Following him are Kashchey, Cherv, Chuma, Topelets, Smert, and the rest of his retinue.
p. 7) Worship of Chernobog.
p. 10) Sabbath.
p. 11) Ballet.
p. 16) Stroke of a matins bell.
p. 17) Satan and his retinue vanish. The scene is covered by clouds.
p. 21) The peasant lad awakens and stands up, stretching and looking around wildly. The clouds disperse. The scene is illuminated by the rising sun.

Russian original

Первое действие, вторая картина: «Сонное видение паробка» (Intermezzo)

л. 1: Холмистая глухая местность. Подземный приближающийся хор адских сил. Занавес поднимается. У подножия холма спит Паробок.
л. 3: Ведьмы и бесы окружают спящего паробка.
л. 5: На холме показываются огненные змеи; приближение Чернобога. Из под земли поднимается Чернобог; за ним Кащей, Червь, Топелец, Чума, Смерть и прочая свита.
л. 7: Служба Чернобогу.
л. 10: Шабаш.
л. 11: Балет.
л. 16: Удар утреннего колокола.
л. 17: Сатана и его свита исчезают. Сцена покрывается облаками.
л. 21: Паробок просыпается и встает, потягиваясь и дико оглядываясь. Облака разбегаются. Сцена освещается восходящим солнцем.

Surviving the transfer from Glorification of Chernobog are the same supernatural characters, although Morena has been replaced by Death (Russian: Смерть, Smert'). Chernobog and his accomplices form a kind of Six Horsemen of the Apocalypse. The demon language the characters sing, of which Mussorgsky was contemptuous in a letter, is preserved.

Mussorgsky sent the following program to Vladimir Stasov about three months after its composition in 1880:

The peasant lad sleeps at the foot of a hillock at some distance from the hut where he should have been. In his sleep appear to him:

1. Subterranean roar of non-human voices, uttering non-human words.
2. The subterranean kingdom of darkness comes into its own—mocking the sleeping peasant lad.
3. Foreshadowing of the appearance of Chernobog (Satan).
4. The peasant lad left by the spirits of darkness. Appearance of Chernobog.
5. Worship of Chernobog and the black mass.
6. Sabbath.
7. At the wildest moment of the sabbath the sound of a Christian church bell. Chernobog suddenly disappears.
8. Suffering of the demons.
9. Voices of the clergy in church.
10. Disappearance of the demons and the peasant lad's awakening.
Russian original

Паробок спит у подножия пригорка, далеко, вдали от хаты, куда бы должен попасть. Во сне ему мерещатся:

1. Подземный гул нечеловеческих голосов, произносящих нечеловеческие слова.
2. Подземное царство тьмы входит в свои права – трунит над спящим Паробком.
3. Предзнамение появления Чернобога (Сатаны).
4. Паробок оставлен духами тьмы. Появление Чернобога.
5. Величание Чернобога и Черная служба.
6. Шабаш.
7. В самом разгаре шабаша удар колокола христианской церкви. Чернобог исчезает мгновенно.
8. Страдания бесов.
9. Голоса церковного клира.
10. Исчезновение бесов и пробуждение Паробка.

=== Recordings ===
As part of The Fair at Sorochyntsi:

- 1969, Yuriy Aronovich, Moscow Radio Orchestra and Chorus
- 1983, Vladimir Yesipov, Stanislavsky Theater Orchestra and Chorus

Concert version:

- 1981, Gennady Rozhdestvensky, BBC Singers, BBC Symphony Chorus, BBC Symphony Orchestra, Moscow Radio Orchestra
- 1997, Valeriy Polyansky, State Symphony Capella of Russia
- 1997, Claudio Abbado, Berliner Philharmoniker
- 1997, Zdeněk Mácal, New Jersey Symphony Orchestra

== Rimsky-Korsakov's fantasy: Night on Bald Mountain (1886) ==
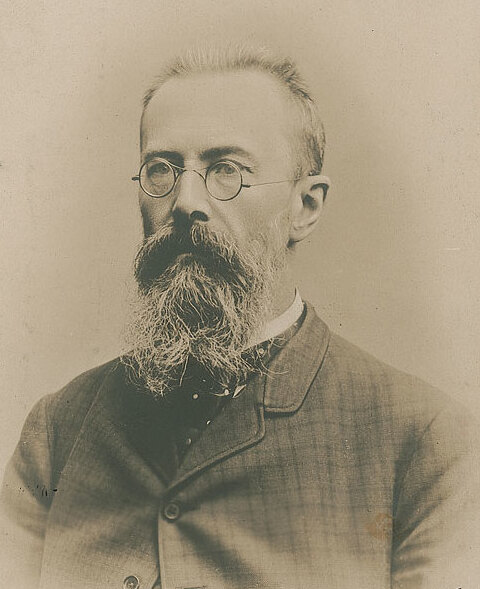
Nikolay Rimsky-Korsakov

=== Composition history ===
In the years after Mussorgsky's death, his friends prepared his manuscripts for publication and created performing editions of his unfinished works to enable them to enter the repertoire. The majority of the editorial work was done by Rimsky-Korsakov, who in 1886 produced a redacted edition of Night on Bald Mountain from the Dream Vision of the Peasant Lad vocal score. Rimsky-Korsakov discusses his work on the piece, designated a "fantasy for orchestra", in his memoirs, Chronicle of My Musical Life (1909):

During the season of 1882/83, I continued working on Khovanshchina and other compositions of Mussorgsky's. A Night on Bald Mountain was the only thing I could not find my way with. Originally composed in the sixties under the influence of Liszt's Danse Macabre (Totentanz) for the piano with accompaniment of orchestra, this piece (then called St. John's Eve, and both severely and justly criticized by Balakirev) had long been utterly neglected by its author, gathering dust among his unfinished works. When composing Gedeonov's Mlada, Mussorgsky had made use of the material to be found in Night, and, introducing singing into it, had written the scene of Chernobog on Mount Triglav. That was the second form of the same piece in substance. Its third form had developed in his composing of Sorochintsï Fair, when Mussorgsky conceived the queer and incoherent idea of making the peasant lad, without rhyme or reason, see the sabbath of devilry in a dream, which was to form a sort of stage intermezzo that did not chime at all with the rest of the scenario of Sorochintsy Fair. This time the piece ended with the ringing of the village church bell, at the sounds of which the frightened evil spirits vanished. Tranquility and dawn were built on the theme of the peasant lad himself, who had seen the fantastic dream. In working on Mussorgsky's piece, I made use of its last version for the purpose of closing the composition. Now then, the first form of the piece was for piano solo with orchestra; the second form and the third, vocal compositions and for the stage, into the bargain (unorchestrated). None of these forms was fit to be published and performed. With Mussorgsky's material as a basis, I decided to create an instrumental piece by retaining all of the author's best and coherent material, adding the fewest possible interpolations of my own. It was necessary to create a form in which Mussorgsky's ideas would mould in the best fashion. It was a difficult task, of which the satisfactory solution baffled me for two years, though in the other works of Mussorgsky I had got on with comparative ease. I had been unable to get at either form, modulation, or orchestration, and the piece lay inert until the following year.

Russian original

«В сезоне 1882/83 года я продолжал работу над «Хованщиной» и другими сочинениями Мусоргского. Не давалась мне только «Ночь на Лысой горе». Сочиненная первоначально в 60-х годах под влиянием листовского «Danse macabre» для фортепиано с сопровождением оркестра, пьеса эта (называвшаяся в то время «Ивановой ночью» и подвергшаяся суровой и справедливой критике Балакирева) была надолго совершенно заброшена автором и лежала без движения среди его «inachevé». При сочинении гедеоновской «Млады» Мусоргский воспользовался имеющимся в «Ночи» материалом и, введя туда пение, написал сцену Чернобога на горе Триглаве. Это был второй вид той же пьесы по существу. Третий вид ее образовался при сочинении «Сорочйнской ярмарки», когда Мусоргскому пришла странная и несуразная мысль заставить парубка, ни с того ни с сего, увидеть шабаш чертовщины во сне, что должно было составить некое сценическое интермеццо, отнюдь не вяжущееся со всем остальным сценариумом «Сорочинской ярмарки». На этот раз пьеса оканчивалась звоном колокола деревенской церкви, при звуках которого испуганная нечистая сила исчезала. Успокоение и рассвет были построены на теме самого парубка, видевшего фантастическое сновидение. При работе над пьесой Мусоргского я воспользовался последним вариантом для заключения сочинения. Итак, первый вид пьесы был solo фортепиано с оркестром, второй и третий вид – вокальное произведение, и притом сценическое (не оркестрованное). Ни один из видов этих не годился для издания и исполнения. Я решился создать из материала Мусоргского инструментальную пьесу, сохранив в ней все, что было лучшего и связного у автора, и добавляя своего по возможности менее. Надо было создать форму, в которую уложились бы наилучшим способом мысли Мусоргского. Задача была трудная, удовлетворительно разрешить которую мне не удавалось в течение двух лет, между тем как с другими сочинениями Мусоргского я справился сравнительно легко. Не давались мне ни форма, ни модуляции, ни оркестровка, и пьеса лежала без движения до следующего года.»

Rimsky-Korsakov made "corrections" typical of him, as he did with Khovanshchina, and was later to do with Boris Godunov, preserving the general thematic structure, but adding or omitting bars, and making modifications to melody, harmony, rhythm, and dynamics.

=== Performance history ===
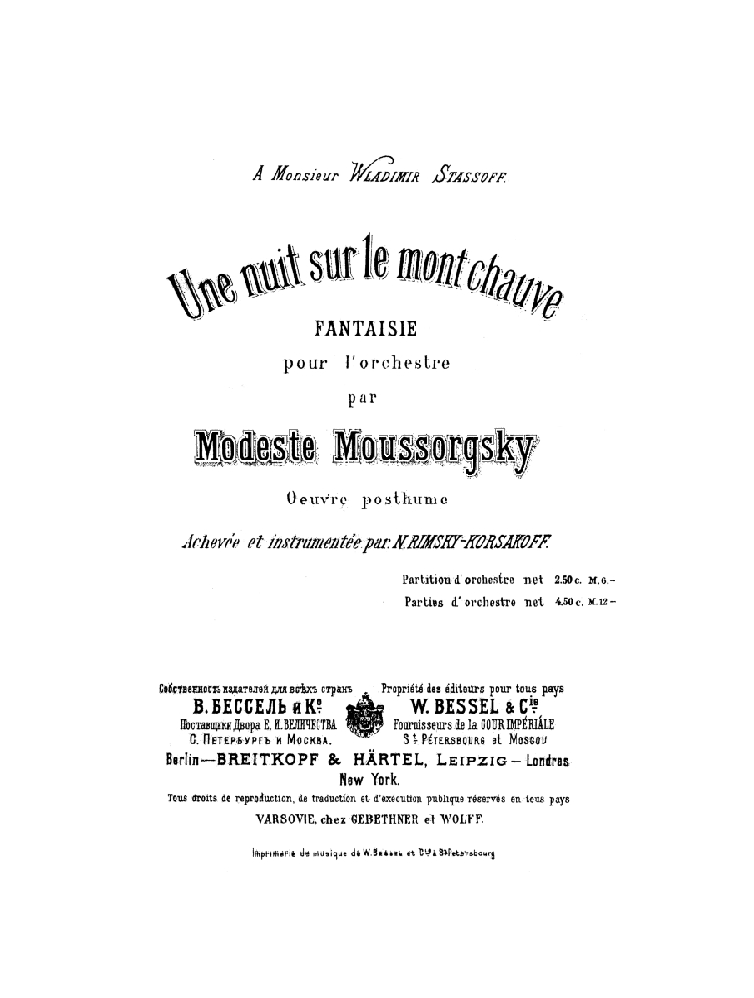
Title page of Rimsky-Korsakov's edition, published by V. Bessel and Co.

Rimsky-Korsakov's edition was completed in 1886, and published in the same year by V. Bessel and Co. It received its premiere on 15 October 1886 in St. Petersburg's Kononov Hall, performed by the orchestra of the Russian Symphony Concerts. Rimsky-Korsakov conducted the performance himself, and gives the following account of it in his memoirs, Chronicle of My Musical Life (1909):

The orchestration of A Night on Bald Mountain, which had baffled me so long, was finished for the concerts of [the 1886/87] season, and the piece, given by me at the first concert in a manner that could not be improved upon, was demanded again and again with unanimity. Only a tam-tam had to be substituted for the bell; the one I selected at the bell-store proved to be off pitch in the hall, owing to a change in temperature.

The Western European premiere performance of his edition was likely the one described further on:

In the summer of 1889, the Paris Universal Exposition took place. Belyayev decided to give there two symphonic concerts of Russian music at the Trocadéro, under my direction... The concerts were set for Saturdays 22 and 29 June, new style. Upon our arrival in Paris, rehearsals commenced. The orchestra, which proved to be excellent, the men being amiable and painstaking, had been borrowed from Colonne. Their playing in the concerts was fine... The success was considerable, with plenty of applause, but the attendance was not large.

Night on Bald Mountain was performed at the second concert, on 29 June 1889, where it followed Borodin's 'Polovtsian Dances' and 'Polovtsian March' from Prince Igor in the second half of the program. Rimsky-Korsakov later mentions another performance of the piece, taking place on 25 April 1890, at the Théâtre de la Monnaie in Brussels.

Night on Bald Mountain
(Rimsky-Korsakov edition, 1886)
Performed by the Skidmore College Orchestra.

=== Instrumentation ===
- Woodwinds: piccolo, 2 flutes, 2 oboes, 2 clarinets, 2 bassoons
- Brass: 4 horns, 2 trumpets, 3 trombones, tuba
- Percussion: timpani, bass drum, cymbals, tam-tam, bell
- Strings: harp, violins, violas, cellos, double basses

=== Program ===
The following program is printed in Rimsky-Korsakov's edition of Night on Bald Mountain, published in 1886 by V. Bessel and Co.:

Subterranean sounds of non-human voices. Appearance of the spirits of darkness, followed by that of Chernobog. Glorification of Chernobog and Black Service. Sabbath. At the height of the sabbath, the distant ringing of a village church bell is heard; it disperses the spirits of darkness. Morning.

Russian original
Подземный гулъ нечеловѣчeскихъ голосовъ. Появление духовъ тьмы и, вследъ за ними, Чернобога. Величаніе Чернобога и Черная Служба. Шабашъ. Въ самомъ разгарѣ шабаша, раздаются отдаленные удары колокола деревенской церкви; они разсѣеваютъ духовъ тьмы. Утро.

== Leopold Stokowski's arrangement: Night on Bald Mountain (1940) ==
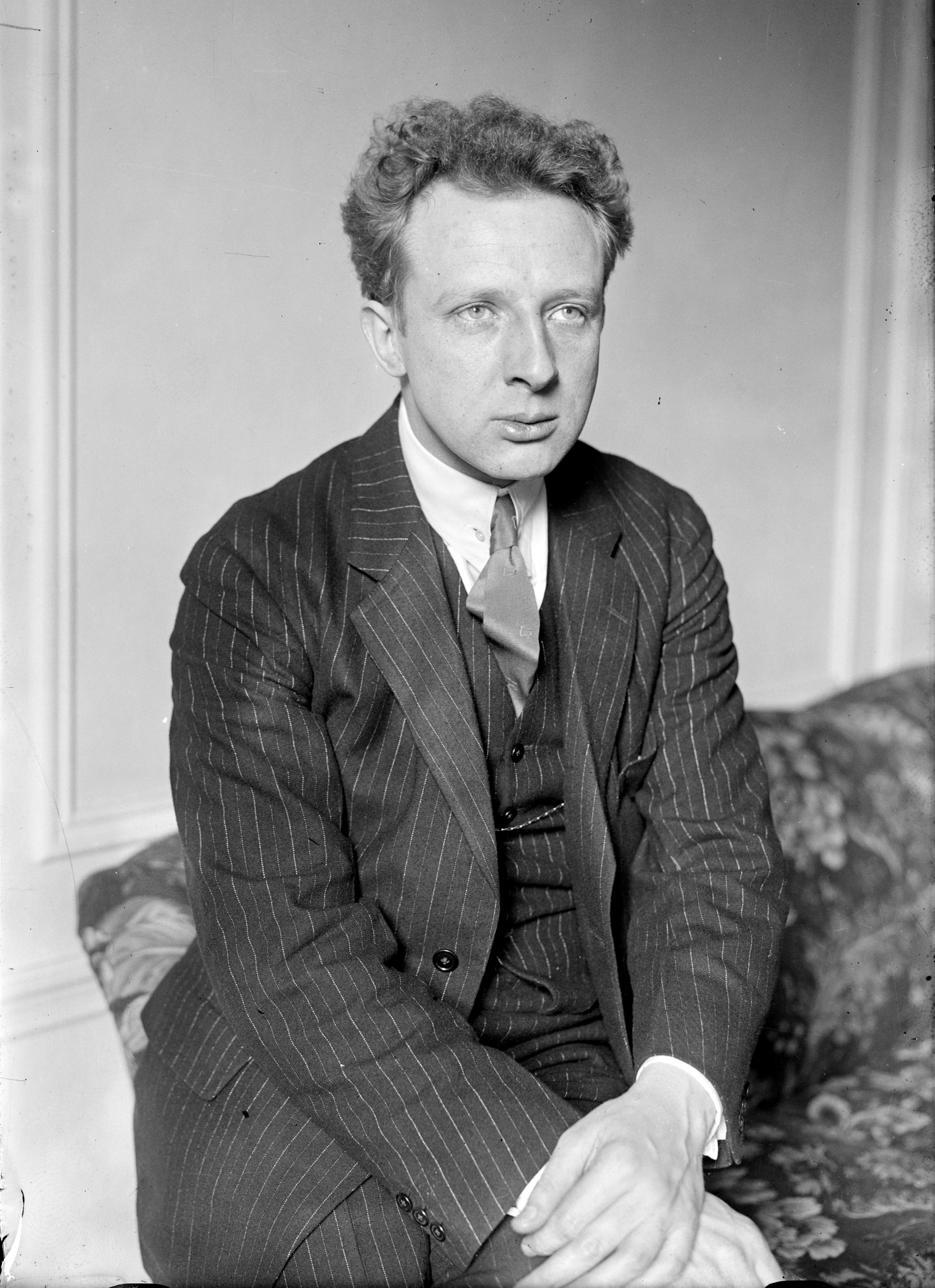
Leopold Stokowski

=== Composition history ===
Millions of 20th-century listeners owe their initial acquaintance with Mussorgsky's tone poem to Leopold Stokowski's version, specially produced for Walt Disney's 1940 film Fantasia where it was linked to Franz Schubert's Ave Maria. Stokowski stated that he based it on the Rimsky-Korsakov arrangement in form and content (though notably without the "fanfare" that marks the entrance of Chernobog), but on Mussorgsky's original in orchestration. However, like Rimsky-Korsakov, Stokowski had no copy of the original tone poem from 1867, so he did what he felt Mussorgsky would have done, being somewhat familiar with Mussorgsky's style. Stokowski had conducted the U.S. premiere of the original version of Boris Godunov in 1929, and subsequently produced a symphonic synthesis of Boris for concert purposes. Despite the success of Fantasia, Rimsky-Korsakov's orchestration remains the concert favorite, and the one most often programmed.

=== Instrumentation ===
- Woodwinds: 2 piccolos, 2 flutes, 2 oboes, 1 cor anglais, 1 E-flat clarinet, 2 clarinets, 1 bass clarinet, 2 bassoons, 1 contrabassoon
- Brass: 5 horns, 4 trumpets, 4 trombones, 1 tuba
- Percussion: timpani, snare drum, bass drum, cymbals, xylophone, tam-tam, bell
- Strings: 2 harps, violins, violas, cellos, double basses

=== Recordings ===
- 1940, Leopold Stokowski, Philadelphia Orchestra
- 1953, Stokowski, "His Symphony Orchestra"
- 1967, Stokowski, London Symphony Orchestra
- 1986, Erich Kunzel, Cincinnati Pops Orchestra
- 1995, James Sedares, New Zealand Symphony Orchestra
- 1996, Matthias Bamert, BBC Philharmonic
- 2004, Oliver Knussen, Cleveland Orchestra
- 2005, José Serebrier, Bournemouth Symphony Orchestra
