= William Ratcliff (Cui) =

Opera by César Cui

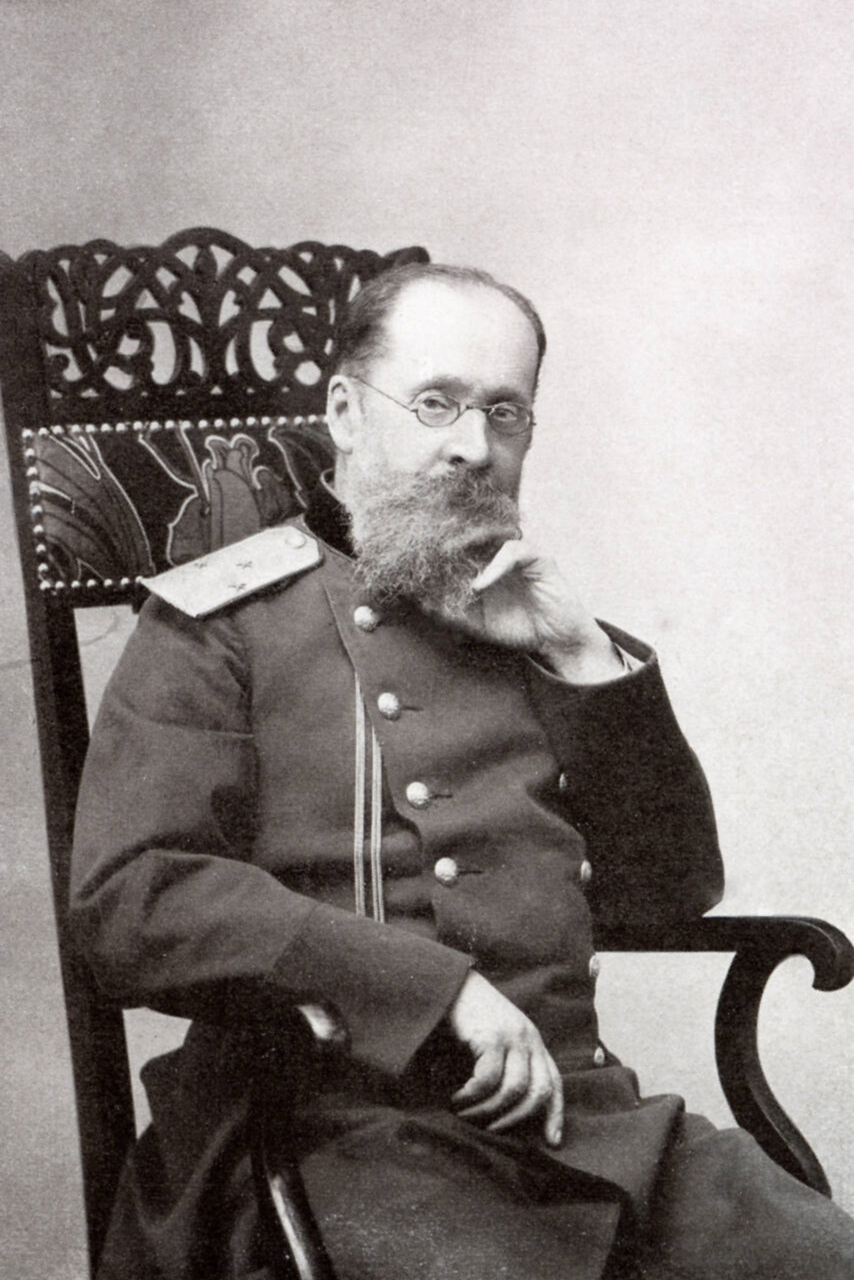
Composer César Cui

William Ratcliff (Вилльям Ратклифф or Вильям Ратклиф in Cyrillic; Vill'jam Ratkliff or Vil'jam Ratklif in transliteration) is an opera in three acts, composed by César Cui during 1861–1868; it was premiered on 14 February 1869 (Old Style) at the Mariinsky Theatre in Saint Petersburg under the conductorship of Eduard Nápravník. Although it was revived in Moscow in 1900 under Mikhail Ippolitov-Ivanov, it never became part of the standard operatic repertoire either in Russia or in the West. Nevertheless, this opera has considerable significance in the history of Russian art music, not only for the fact that it was the first opera by a member of The Five to reach the stage, but also for musical features that suggest experimentation and interrelationships among The Five.

== Libretto ==
The subject for the opera was suggested to the composer by Mily Balakirev, who also orchestrated certain passages of the opera, as did Nikolai Rimsky-Korsakov.

The libretto of the opera was adapted by the composer from Vasily Zhukovsky's Russian verse translation of the like-named tragedy by Heinrich Heine, with some additional verses by Viktor Krylov, who had already written the libretti for Cui's operas Prisoner of the Caucasus and The Mandarin's Son. (The same play has been used for other operas, most notably Pietro Mascagni's Guglielmo Ratcliff, which premiered over a quarter century later.)

The action takes place in Scotland, during the 17th century (Heine's original was set in Scotland of his own time).

== Characters and setting ==
- Principal roles:
  - MacGregor, a wealthy Scottish lord (bass)
  - Mary (Maria), his daughter (soprano)
  - Margaret, her wet-nurse (mezzo-soprano)
  - Earl Douglas, Maria's fiancé (tenor)
  - William Ratcliff (baritone)
- Minor roles:
  - Lesley, Ratcliff's friend (tenor)
  - Robin, a vagrant (bass)
  - Tom, a vagrant (baritone)
  - Betsy, a servant at the tavern (soprano)
  - Servants, wedding guests, swindlers, robbers (chorus)

== Synopsis ==
The plot is fairly bloody, and follows the conventions of the German Schicksalsdrama, or "drama of fate" of the early 19th century. Many relevant motives and events actually occur before the curtain rises and have to be rendered in long narratives, leaving the action on stage significantly static for much of the time. The primary departures from Heine's original drama include the wedding choruses in Act I and the replacement of the intimate "Pater Noster" episode in the tavern scene of Act II, Tableau 1 with a comic ensemble scene.

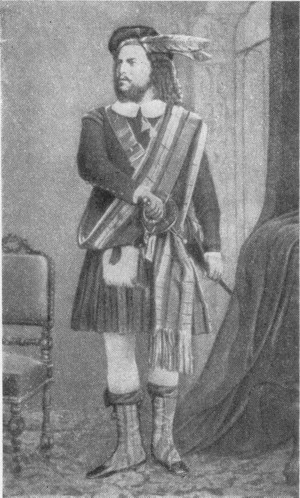
I.A. Mel'nikov premiering in the title role of Cui's William Ratcliff, 1869

- Pre-curtain events: In years past MacGregor's wife Betty fell in love with Edward Ratcliff, the father of William. When MacGregor killed Edward out of jealousy, Betty herself died from grief. The spectres of Edward and Betty haunt William, who kills the first two men to whom MacGregor's daughter Mary has been betrothed.

Act I, Tableau 1. In MacGregor's castle, Mary, who in her heart really loves William, is being wed to Douglas. The guests celebrate the wedding. MacGregor blesses the couple. Margaret intones a portentous song with the line "Why is your sword so red with blood, Edward"? This disturbs Douglas, and Mary tries to calm him. He tells about being attacked on the road by highwaymen. Mary faints, but soon recovers. Douglas continues by telling of a mysterious man who rescued him. MacGregor sends Mary and the guests away to the banquet hall. He reveals to Douglas the details of Mary's previous two suitors.

Act I, Tableau 2. Amidst a congratulatory chorus, Ratcliff's agent Lesley delivers a challenge to Douglas to a duel.

Act II, Tableau 1. At a tavern, the patrons are entertaining themselves by making fun of the drunken Robin. Lesley sings a merry song. Ratcliff enters, and the people fall asleep. He tells Lesley of the two spectres that reach out to embrace each other, and of his childhood with Mary, and why he killed her two previous suitors. He begins to hallucinate, and the sleeping tavern clientele wake up. Ratcliff and Lesley leave, and the rest go back to sleep.

Act II, Tableau 2. Outside, by the Black Stone, Ratliff awaits Douglas. When the latter enters, he recognizes Ratcliff as the man who saved him from the robbers. Nevertheless, the duel is engaged. Douglas seriously wounds Ratcliff and leaves. Ratcliff, regaining consciousness, begins to hear witches laughing at him and runs off amidst thunder, lightning, and wind.

Act III. In Mary's bedroom, she tells Margaret how sweet William Ratcliff used to be, and how she is having dreams that he is a spectre reaching out to her. She asks what happened to her mother, and Margaret relates the events. Despite his injury, Ratcliff, whom Margaret mistakes as Edward, enters. Mary tends to his wounds. When Margaret intones her song again, Ratcliff goes mad and kills Mary. MacGregor, responding to calls for help, enters, and is killed by Ratcliff, who goes off to the alcove and commits suicide. The two phantoms appear and embrace. Douglas and guests enter and react to the tragedy.

== Notable selections ==
- Orchestral Introduction
- Mary's Romance (Act I, Tableau 1)
- MacGregor's Narrative (Act I, Tableau 1)
- Lesley's Song (Act II, Tableau 1)
- Ratcliff's Narrative (Act II, Tableau 1)
- Scene by the Black Stone (Act II, Tableau 2)
- Orchestral Introduction to Act III
- Mary's [Second] Romance (Act III)
- Margaret's Narrative (Act III)
- Duet of Ratcliff and Mary (Act III)

== Bibliography ==
Bernandt, G.B. Словарь опер впервые поставленных или изданных в дореволюционной России и в СССР, 1736-1959 [Dictionary of Operas First Performed or Published in Pre-Revolutionary Russia and in the USSR, 1836-1959] (Москва: Советский композитор, 1962), p. 56.

Cui, César. Вилльям Ратклифф: опера в трех действиях. Фортепианное переложение с пением [William Ratcliff, opera in three acts. Piano-vocal score]. Leipzig: R. Seitz, 1869.

Nazarov, A.F. Цезарь Антонович Кюи [Cezar' Antonovič Kjui]. Moskva: Muzyka, 1989.

Stasov, V.V. "Цезарь Антонович Кюи: биографический очерк" ["César Antonovich Cui: a biographical sketch."] Артист [Artist] [Moscow], no. 34 (1894).

Taruskin, Richard. Opera and Drama in Russia As Preached and Practiced in the 1860s. New ed. Rochester: University of Rochester Press, 1993.
