= Mlada =

1872 opera-ballet by multiple composers

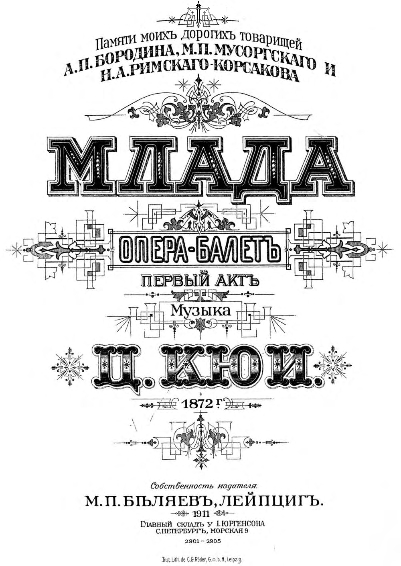
Title page to the score of César Cui's contribution to Mlada, published "in memory of my dear comrades A. P. Borodin, M. P. Mussorgsky, and N. A. Rimsky-Korsakov" (M. P. Belyayev, Leipzig, 1911).

Mlada (Russian: Млада, the name of a main character) was a project conceived in 1870 by Stepan Gedeonov (1816–1878), director of the Saint Petersburg Imperial Theatres, originally envisioned as a ballet to be composed by Aleksandr Serov with choreography by Marius Petipa.

The project was revised in 1872 as an opera-ballet in four acts, with a libretto by Viktor Krïlov. The composition of the score was divided between César Cui, Modest Mussorgsky, Nikolay Rimsky-Korsakov, and Aleksandr Borodin, including interpolated ballet music by Ludwig Minkus. The project was never completed, although much of the score was composed. A printed version, primarily in piano-vocal score, based upon materials available at the time, was published in 2016 by A-R Editions under the editorship of Albrecht Gaub. A performing version of the whole opera was completed by British composer Peter Cowdrey in 2023.

This work is not to be confused with the completed and occasionally performed opera-ballet Mlada (1890) by Nikolay Rimsky-Korsakov, which uses the same libretto by Viktor Krylov, but is otherwise a different composition.

== Composition history ==
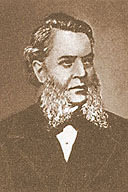
Stepan Gedeonov
(1816–1878)

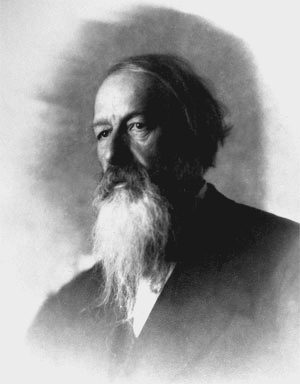
Vladimir Stasov
(1824–1906)

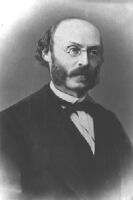
Ludwig Minkus
(1826–1917)

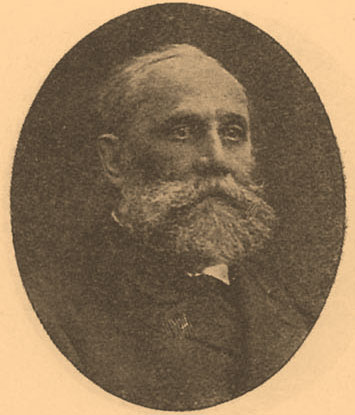
Viktor Krïlov
(1838–1908)

Mlada was conceived in 1870 by Stepan Gedeonov, director of the Imperial Theatres (1867–1875), as a ballet to be choreographed by Marius Petipa with music by Alexander Serov. The plot of Mlada was adapted, with a new time and place, from a ballet by Filippo Taglioni entitled The Shadow (French: L'Ombre, Russian: Тѣнь, Tyeñ ), which premiered in 1839 in Saint Petersburg.

Serov died, however, in 1871 before composing anything for the work. Gedeonov revised his conception as an opera-ballet, with a libretto by Viktor Krïlov, and in 1872 proposed through Vladimir Stasov a collaborative effort by four members of The Mighty Handful—César Cui, Nikolay Rimsky-Korsakov, Modest Mussorgsky, and Aleksandr Borodin—who were to write music for the sung portions of the libretto and dramatic action. Ludwig Minkus, at that time the Bolshoy Kamenniy Theatre's First Imperial Ballet Composer, was to write ballet music to be inserted at various points.

Rimsky-Korsakov provides the following details concerning the work's genesis in his memoirs, Chronicle of My Musical Life, 1909:

"Gedeonov, Director of the Imperial Theatres at the time, had conceived the idea of producing a work which should combine ballet, opera and spectacle. For this purpose he had written the program of a stage performance in four acts on a subject borrowed from the Elbe slavs and had commissioned V. A. Krïlov to work up the text. Mlada, with its mixture of fantasy and everyday reality, was a most grateful subject for musical treatment. Gedeonov asked Cui, Borodin, Mussorgsky, and myself to compose music for it; moreover, Minkus, the official ballet composer of the Imperial Theatres, was to compose the incidental ballet music. Who the initiator of this order was, I do not know. I suspect here the influence of Lukashevich, an official of the Board of Directors of the Theatres, who had begun to gain power under Gedeonov... I also believe that the connection had not happened without V. V. Stasov's having something to do with it. The four of us were invited to Gedeonov's for a joint deliberation on the work. Act 1, as the most dramatic, was entrusted to the most dramatic composer—Cui; Act 4, a mixture of the dramatic and poetic, to Borodin; Acts 2 and 3 were distributed between Mussorgsky and myself. Some portions of Act 2 (folk-wise choruses) were assigned to me; the first half of Act 3 (flight of shadows and appearance of Mlada) was reserved for me; while Mussorgsky undertook the second half—appearance of Chernobog, for which he wanted to utilize his Night on Bald Mountain, heretofore unused.

The thought of Mlada and the few sketches I made for it took me away from The Maid of Pskov and the work on The Stone Guest. Cui composed the whole first act of Mlada rather rapidly. Borodin, who had been somewhat disappointed in writing Prince Igor, now took much of the suitable material from it, composed some new music also, and thus wrote almost the whole draft of Act 4. Mussorgsky composed the 'March of the Princes' on a Russian theme (subsequently published separately, with the 'Trio alla Turca'), as well as some other portions of Act 2; he also made suitable changes in his Night on the Bare Mountain and adapted it for Chernobog's appearance in Act 3 of Mlada. On the other hand, my notes of the chorus in Act 2 and the flight of shadows in Act 3 were still uncompleted and nothing would come of them, owing to a certain haziness and indefiniteness in the task of writing music to a scenario insufficiently worked out.

Gedeonov's scheme was not destined to be realized. Soon he left the post of Director of the Imperial Theatres and vanished from sight. The Mlada affair dropped into oblivion, and all of us turned to the work we had left for it; whatever we had composed for Mlada found its way into other compositions later."

Russian original

«Тогдашний директор императорских театров Гедеонов задумал осуществить произведение, соединяющее в себе балет, оперу и феерию. С этой целью он написал программу сценического представления в 4-х действиях, заимствовав сюжет из жизни полабских славян, и поручил разработку текста В. А. Крылову. Сюжет «Млады» с его фантастическими и бытовыми сценами являлся весьма благодарным для воспроизведения в музыке. Сочинение этой музыки было предложено Гедеоновым Кюи, Бородину, Мусоргскому и мне; сверх того, чисто балетные танцы должен был сочинить официальный балетный композитор при императорских театрах —Минкус. Откуда шел почин этого заказа, я не знаю. Предполагаю здесь влияние Лукашевича, чиновника театральной дирекции, начинавшего входить в силу при Гедеонове. Лукашевич был близок к певице Ю. Ф. Платоновой и знаменитому О. А. Петрову, последние оба пользовались симпатией Л. И. Шестаковой; таким образом устанавливалась некоторая связь между нашим кружком и директором театров. Полагаю также, что это дело не обошлось без участия В. В. Стасова. Мы четверо были приглашены к Гедеонову для совместного обсуждения работы, 1-е действие, как наиболее драматичное, было поручено наиболее драматическому композитору —Кюи; 4-е, смесь драматического и стихийного, — Бородину, 2-е и 3-е действия были распределены между мною и Мусоргским, причем некоторые части 2-го действия (бытовые хоры) достались мне, а в 3-м мне была предоставлена первая его половина: полет теней и явление Млады, а Мусоргский взял на себя вторую половину —явление Чернобога, в которую он намеревался пристроить оставшуюся не у дел «Ночь на Лысой горе».

Мысль о «Младе» и сделанные мною некоторые наброски отвлекли меня от «Псковитянки» и от работы над «Каменным гостем». Кюи довольно быстро сочинил все 1-е действие «Млады»; Бородин, несколько разочарованный в ту пору в сочинении «Князя Игоря», взял из последнего много подходящего материала, а некоторое сочинив вновь, написал почти что весь эскиз 4-го действия. Мусоргский сочинил «Марш князей» на русскую тему (впоследствии изданный отдельно с трио ala turca) и еще кое-что для 2-го действия, а также переделал соответственно свою «Ночь на Лысой горе», приспособив ее для явления Чернобога в 3-м действии «Млады». Мои же наброски хора из 2-го действия и полет теней 3-го оставались недоделанными и не клеились, по некоторой неясности и неопределенности самой задачи, с недостаточно выработанной сценической программой.

Затее Гедеонова не суждено было осуществиться; вскоре он покинул должность директора императорских театров и куда-то скрылся из виду. Дело с «Младой» заглохло, и мы все снова принялись за покинутые из-за нее на время работы, а все сделанное нами для «Млады» впоследствии разошлось по другим сочинениям.»

Although the music was for the most part completed, the work was never staged. To date there is no published edition that collates the original manuscripts containing all the extant music composed for the Mlada of 1872.

== Roles ==
- Princess Voyslava, daughter of Mstivoy
- Mstivoy, Prince of Retra
- Svyatokhna, later transformed into the goddess Morena
- Yaromir, Prince of Arkona, Voyslava's fiancé, formerly betrothed to Mlada
- A Ruthenian
- Lumir, a Czech singer
- A Priest
- The High Priest
- Chernobog
- Mlada
- Chorus, silent roles, corps de ballet: Maidens, people, hunters, merchants, Polabians, Novgorodians, devils, witches, dwarves

== Synopsis ==
Time: The 9th to 10th centuries
Place: The land of the Polabian Slavs, between the Baltic Sea coast and the Elbe River.

Note: Certain elements of the plot below are conjectural, owing to the paucity of documentation of the 1872 project, and are taken from the plots of Minkus' ballet (1879) and Rimsky-Korsakov's complete operatic setting (1890).

=== Act 1 ===
The castle of Mstivoy, Prince of Retra

Voyslava has killed Mlada, Yaromir's bride, to have him for herself. With the help of Morena, the goddess of the underworld, she has captivated Yaromir. But he sees the murder in his dreams.

=== Act 2 ===
The plain near Retra on the banks of Lake Dolinskoye

At the midsummer festival the people dance, however the spirit of Mlada intervenes between Yaromir and Voyslava.

=== Act 3 ===
Night. A gorge on Mount Triglav

By night Mlada leads Yaromir up Mount Triglav, where the dead gather, before the Witches' Sabbath in which Yaromir is shown a vision of Cleopatra.

=== Act 4 ===
Outside the Temple of Radegast in Retra

Yaromir, at the Temple of Radegast, is shown by the spirits that Voyslava is guilty. She confesses her sin and he kills her. Morena, with whom Voyslava had made a compact, destroys the temple and the city of Retra, but Yaromir is united with Mlada in heaven.

== Subsequent use of musical materials ==
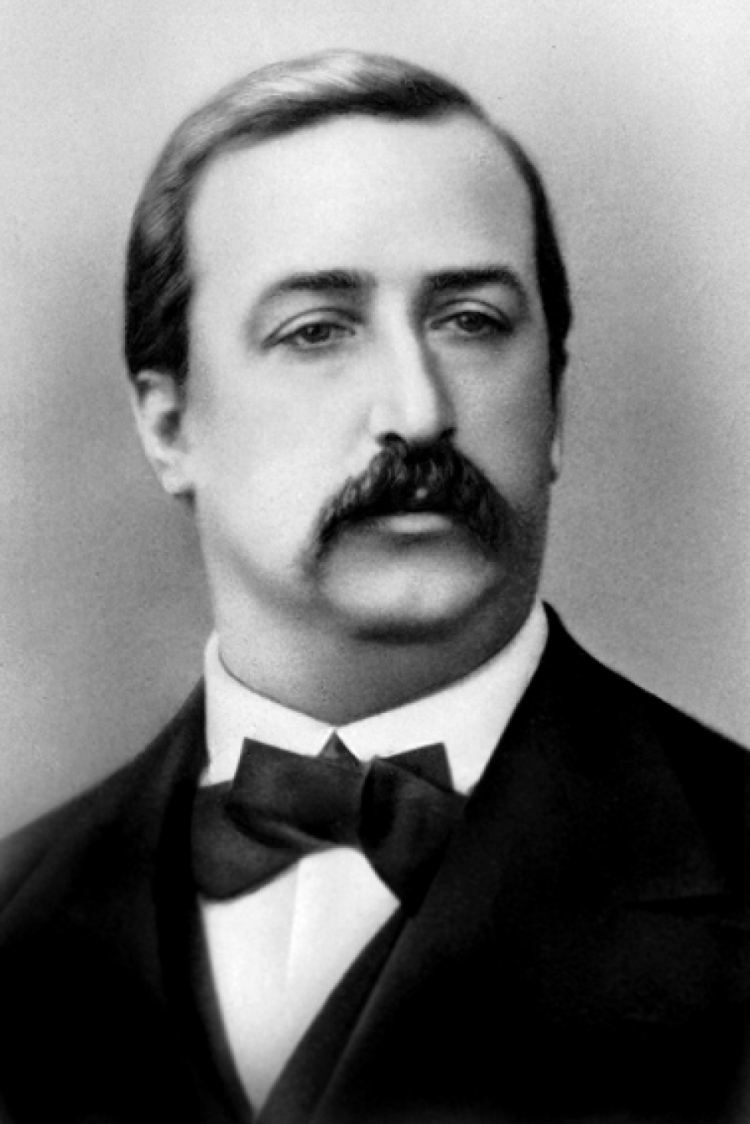
Aleksandr Borodin
(1833-1887)

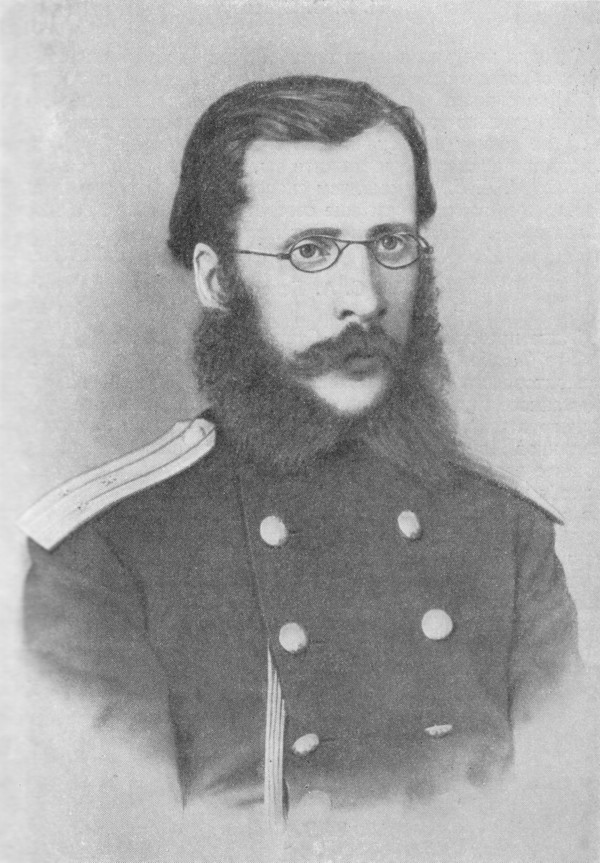
César Cui
(1835–1918)

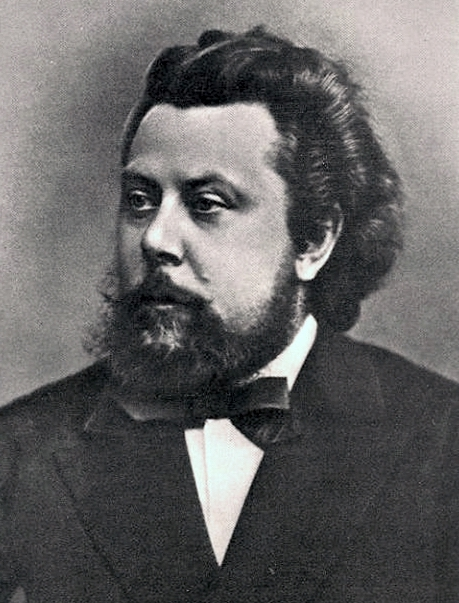
Modest Mussorgsky
(1839–1881)

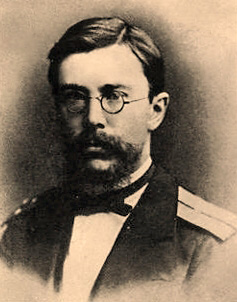
Nikolai Rimsky-Korsakov
(1844–1908)

Most of the composers used their music from the 1872 project in later works.

Cui

The only extended unrecycled music from The Mighty Handful's collaborative Mlada is Act 1, which was composed by Cui (except for inserted dance music assigned to Minkus). Although Cui borrowed a terzetto from it for his revision of Prisoner of the Caucasus in 1881–1882, the remainder of the act was not appropriated for other works. Late in life (1911) he edited and published Act 1 and dedicated it to the memory of Borodin, Mussorgsky, and Rimsky-Korsakov.

Mussorgsky

Mussorgsky contributed four numbers—two borrowed from previous works and two newly composed for Mlada. All of them would be recycled in subsequent projects:

1. The 'Market Scene' (Russian: «Сцена торга», Stsena torga) in Act 2 was later adapted as the 'Fair Scene' in the opera Sorochintsï Fair (1880).
2. The 'Fistfight' (Russian: «Кулачный бой», Kulachnïy boy) in Act 2 was borrowed from the 'Scene in the Temple: Chorus of the People' from Oedipus in Athens (1860), Mussorgsky's earliest stage work. The composer had attempted to recycle this piece in Salammbô (1866), and planned to do so again in Sorochintsï Fair, thus making it, in four attempts, his most adapted composition.
3. The 'March of the Princes and Priests' (Russian: «Марш князей и жрецов», Marsh knyazey i zhretsov) in Act 2 was later adapted as The Capture of Kars (1880), an occasional piece for orchestra. The main theme of this march was taken from song no. 6 (Russian: «А как по лугу, лугу», A kak po lugu, lugu) in Miliy Balakirev's Anthology of Russian Folk Songs (1866). This theme was later used by Tchaikovsky as the opening theme of the 4th movement of his Serenade for Strings, Op. 48 (1880). Mussorgsky's march corresponds to Rimsky-Korsakov's dazzling 'Procession of the Princes' (popularly known as the 'Procession of the Nobles') in his later setting of Mlada.
4. The 'Glorification of Chornobog' (Russian: «Славленье Чёрнобога», Slavlenye Chornoboga) in Act 3 was borrowed from the tone poem St. John's Night on the Bare Mountain (1867), and was later adapted as the 'Dream Vision of the Peasant Lad' in Sorochintsï Fair (1880). Among other changes, this revision saw the addition of vocal soloists and chorus to what had previously been a purely orchestral score. The manuscript score of the 'Glorification of Chornobog' is either no longer extant or was reused (with the necessary alternations made) as that of the 'Dream Vision of the Peasant Lad'.

Borodin

After Borodin's death, Rimsky-Korsakov edited and published the Finale from Act 4 as an orchestral concert piece.

Act	Composer	Mlada Scenario 1872	Borrowings and subsequent use of materials
Act 1	Cui	• Voyslava and Mstivoy • Voyslava and Svyatokhna • Appearance of Yaromir • Yaromir's Dreams • Yaromir and Retainers	Later published as Mlada: The First Act (1911)
Act 2	Mussorgsky	Market Scene	Later adapted as the Fair Scene (in Act 1, Scene 1) in the opera The Fair at Sorochyntsi (1880)
Act 2	Mussorgsky	Fistfight	Borrowed from 'Scene in the Temple: Chorus of the People' from Oedipus in Athens (1860) Later planned to be adapted in the opera The Fair at Sorochyntsi (1880)
Act 2	Mussorgsky	Lumir and the Czechs	—
Act 2	Mussorgsky	March of the Princes and Priests	Later adapted as The Capture of Kars (1880), an occasional piece for orchestra. In the middle portion (the trio), the "theme of the priests" is by Rimsky-Korsakov (called by him the "melody of the pagan nuptials"), and was used in the Andante of his String Quartet in F major (1875)
Act 2	Rimsky-Korsakov	• The Divination • Folk Dances • Kolo (Khorovod)	• Some Mlada materials suggested "Pannochka's singing with the harps" (in Act 3, No.13) in May Night (1879) • The Kolo was adapted as the 'Khorovod of the Rusalki' (Act 3, No. 13c) in May Night • Two elements from sketches for Mlada were transferred to The Snow Maiden (1881), becoming: Mizgir's motive "Oh, tell me, tell me, say but one word", and "the harmonic base of the motive of the glow-worm"
Act 3	Rimsky-Korsakov	• Flight of Shadows • The Appearance of Mlada	• Some Mlada materials suggested "Pannochka's singing with the harps" (in Act 3, No.13) in May Night (1879) • The Kolo was adapted as the 'Khorovod of the Rusalki' (Act 3, No. 13c) in May Night • Two elements from sketches for Mlada were transferred to The Snow Maiden (1881), becoming: Mizgir's motive "Oh, tell me, tell me, say but one word", and "the harmonic base of the motive of the glow-worm"
Act 3	Mussorgsky	• Sabbath of Dark Spirits • Apparition of Queen Cleopatra • Yaromir Awakens	Some themes were borrowed from the tone poem St. John's Night on the Bare Mountain (1867); subsequently adapted as Dream Vision of the Peasant Lad (Act 1, Scene 2) in the opera The Fair at Sorochyntsi (1880)
Act 4	Borodin	Numbers 1-4: • Offerings to Radegast • Yaromir and the Priests • Yaromir and the Spectres • Yaromir and Voyslava	These materials were later used in Prince Igor (1887): • The opening chorus (in the Prologue) • Yaroslavna's arioso and Igor's aria (in Acts 1 & 2) • The eclipse (in the Prologue) • The trio (in Act 3)
Act 4	Borodin	Numbers 5-7: • Morena's Wrath • Storm and Flood, Destruction of the Temple • Mlada and Yaromir Re-United	Finale to Act IV of Mlada (1892), concert piece edited and orchestrated by Rimsky-Korsakov
Act 4	Borodin	Number 8: Conclusion	Materials later used in Prince Igor (1887): The closing chorus

== Related works ==
Mlada (1879), a ballet by Ludwig Minkus

A pure ballet adaptation of the scenario was later realized by choreographer Marius Petipa and composer Ludwig Minkus, premiering on December 2, 1879, the year after Gedeonov's death, at the St. Petersburg Imperial Bolshoi Kammeny Theatre by the Imperial Ballet. A revival of the ballet, mounted by Petipa, was presented on September 25, 1896.

Mlada (1890), an opera-ballet by Nikolai Rimsky-Korsakov

In 1889-1890 Rimsky-Korsakov dusted off the libretto of 1872 and composed his own complete setting. The St. Petersburg premiere took place at the Mariinsky Theatre on 1 November 1892, conducted by Eduard Nápravník.
