= Veselka (disambiguation) =

Veselka is a Ukrainian restaurant in Manhattan.

Veselka can also refer to:

- Veselka (surname)
- Veselka Pevec (fl. 2016), Slovene Paralympic sport shooter
- Veselka (Centuria), member of the Iris Stratum in the Japanese web manga Centuria
