= Symphony No. 2 (Borodin) =

Symphony composed by Alexander Borodin

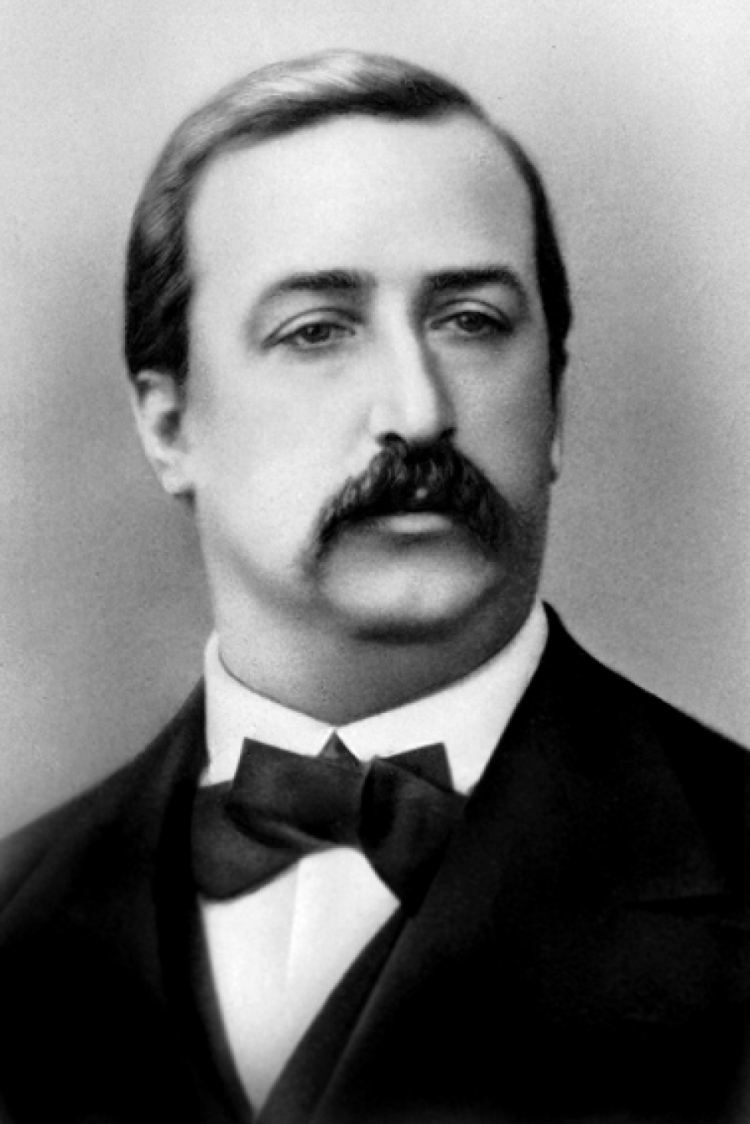
Borodin, c. 1865

Symphony No. 2 in B minor by Alexander Borodin was composed intermittently between 1869 and 1876. It consists of four movements and is considered the most important large-scale work completed by the composer himself. It has many melodic resemblances to both Prince Igor and Mlada, two theatre works that diverted Borodin's attention on and off during the six years of composition.

== Composition ==
Although he had a keen interest in music, Borodin's scientific research and teaching duties as an adjunct professor of Chemistry in the Medico-Surgical Academy at St. Petersburg since 1874 interrupted his composition of the Second Symphony. As a result, this symphony took several years to complete.

On visiting him I seldom found him working in the laboratory which adjoined his apartment. When he sat over his retorts filled with some colorless gas and distilled it by means of a tube from one vessel into another, I used to tell him that he was ‘transfusing emptiness into vacancy’. Having finished his work, he would go without me to his apartment, where he began musical operations or conversations, in the midst of which he used to jump up, run back to the laboratory to see whether something had not burned out or boiled over; meanwhile he filled the corridor with incredible sequences from successions of ninths or sevenths.

— Rimsky-Korsakov

Immediately after the successful premiere of his first symphony in E♭ conducted by Mily Balakirev at the Imperial Russian Music concert in 1869, Borodin began writing the Second Symphony in B minor. That summer, he left off work on the piece in order to work on Prince Igor (Knyaz Igor), an opera based on a 12th-century epic "the Story of Igor's Army," suggested by his friend and first biographer Vladimir Stasov. Borodin suddenly decided to abandon Prince Igor in March 1870, criticizing his own inability to write a libretto that would satisfy both musical and scenic requirement. He told his wife, "There is scarcely any drama or scenic movement… Anyhow, opera seems to me an unnatural thing… besides I am by nature a lyricist and symphonist; I am attracted by the symphonic forms."

Soon after setting Prince Igor aside, Borodin returned to the B minor Symphony, assuring Stasov that the "materials" created for the opera would be used in the newly revived symphony. According to Stasov in an article contributed to the "Vestnik Evropi" in 1883, Borodin told him more than once that in the first movement he wished to depict a gathering of Russian warrior-heroes, in the slow movement the figure of a bayan—a type of Russian accordion, and in the finale a scene of heroes feasting to the sound of guslis—an ancient plucked instrument.

He composed most of the first movement in April 1870, and he wrote it out onto a piano score a year later, in spring 1871. In that same year he sketched the Scherzo and Andante. That summer he orchestrated the first movement, and in October he drafted the finale.

Borodin's work on the symphony was again interrupted when the Director of the Imperial Theatres, Stephan Gedenov, asked him to collaborate on an extravagant opera-ballet Mlada with other members of Vladimir Stasov's "mighty little heap," namely Cesar Cui, Modest Petrovich Mussorgsky, and Nikolai Rimsky-Korsakov. In his usual fashion of composing, Borodin borrowed heavily from earlier works, in this case Prince Igor. The show was ultimately cancelled because of production costs, and Borodin once again turned to the B minor Symphony.

A new interest took his attention away from the composition once again in the fall of 1872 as the Tsar Alexander II's government passed legislation allowing women to take advanced medical courses. As an advocate of the new campaign, Borodin became the founder of a School of Medicine for women, where he taught several courses. Despite these distractions, Borodin finished the piano score in May 1873.

The following academic year (1873–74), more and more irritated that he was not receiving support or recognition for his scientific work, he published his last paper on aldehydes and turned to teaching; it was at this time that he became director of the Medical-Surgical Academy's laboratory facilities. Meanwhile, he also took up Prince Igor again and worked on orchestrating the final three movements of the symphony, although this work was not ultimately completed until 1875.

In the autumn of 1876, the Russian Musical Society showed an interest in performing the symphony; however, Borodin was disconcerted to find that he had lost the full score. Although the middle movements were eventually found, he had to reorchestrate the outer two movements while sick in bed. The work was premiered 10 March 1877 under the baton of Eduard Nápravník. This symphony fits in the debate over the merit of folklore elements and traditional western art music values, which was a central conflict of Romantic nationalism. The work was popular, but according to Rimsky-Korsakov, only enjoyed "moderate success" because Borodin had written the brass part too thickly.

Borodin's relationship with Liszt also had influenced his symphonic writing. Later in 1877, Borodin traveled to Germany in order to enroll some of his chemistry pupils in Jena University. While in Germany, Borodin visited Liszt in Weimar where the two played through both of Borodin's symphonies in four-hand piano arrangements. Liszt had been an admirer of Borodin's music and he arranged performances of Borodin's symphonies, making them the first Russian symphonies to be received abroad. Regarding Borodin's attempt to revise his score, Liszt said,

Heaven forbid! Do not touch it; alter nothing. Your modulations are neither extravagant nor faulty. Your artistic instinct is such that you need not fear to be original. Do not listen to those who would deter you from following your own way. You are on the right road. Similar advice was given to Mozart and to Beethoven, who wisely ignored it. Despite the adage that ‘there is nothing new under the sun,’ your Second Symphony is entirely new. Nobody had done anything like it. And it is perfectly logical in structure.

From another source,

you are always lucid, intelligent and perfectly original […] work in your own way and pay no attention to anyone.

== Instrumentation ==
The symphony is scored for the following orchestra:

Woodwinds
piccolo
2 flutes
2 oboes (one doubling on cor anglais)
2 clarinets
2 bassoons
Brass
4 horns
2 trumpets
3 trombones
tuba

Percussion
3 timpani
triangle
tambourine
bass drum
cymbals (in the finale only)

Strings
harp

1st violins
2nd violins
violas
cellos
double basses

== Score and edition ==
In 1879 Borodin revised the orchestration of the symphony and thinned out the heavy brass parts. The premiere of this final version took place 4 March 1879 under the baton of Rimsky-Korsakov at a Free School Concert. Borodin became occupied with the symphony one last time in 1886, while preparing the manuscript full score for the printer. He made a few refinement changes suggested by Rimsky-Korsakov, who also provided the metronome markings based on the successful second performance.

== Description ==
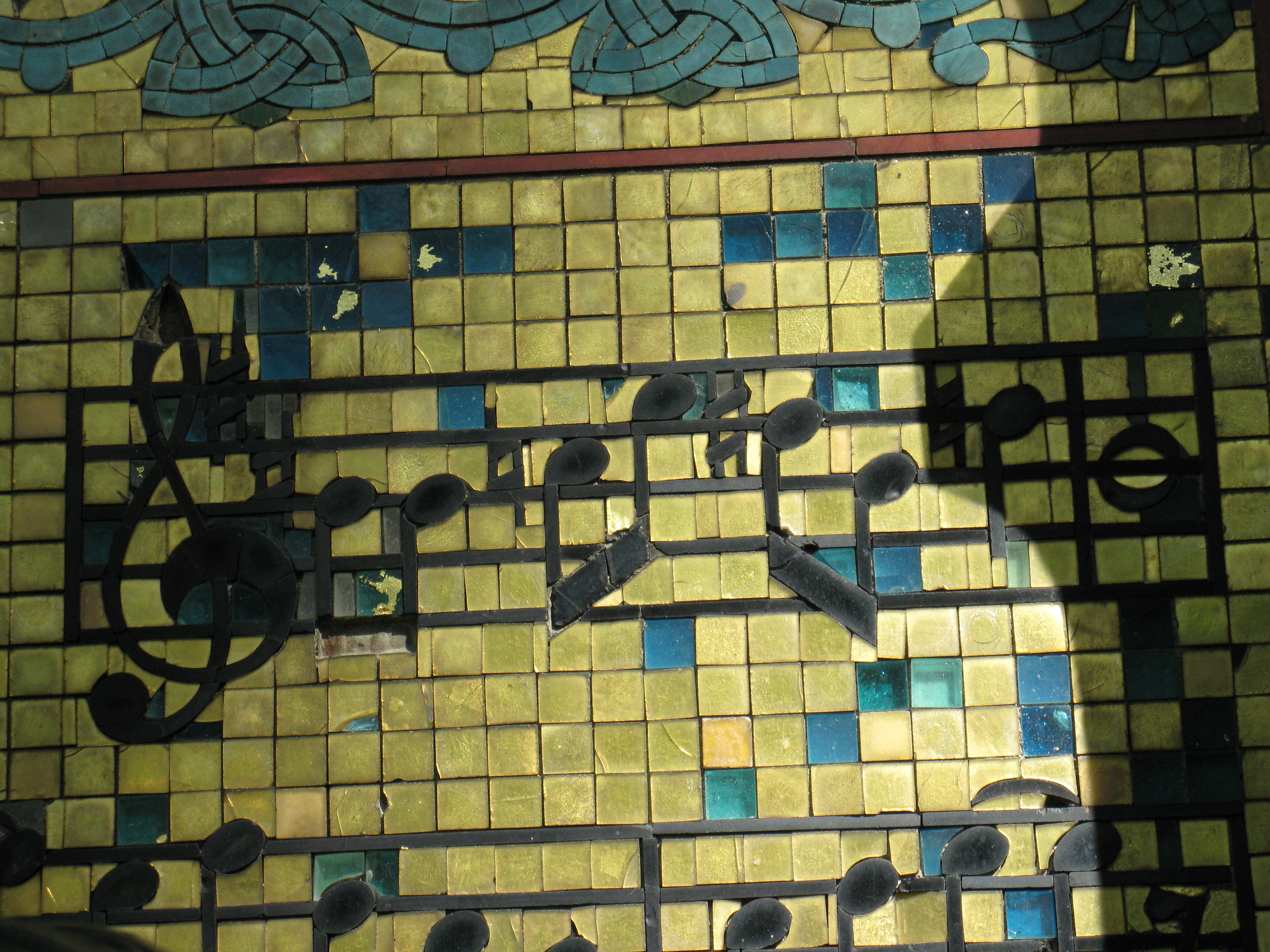
Theme of the first movement on Borodin's grave monument.

The B minor Symphony is arguably the most important large-scale work completed by the composer, and is considered to be one of his greatest compositions. It has many melodic resemblances to both Prince Igor and Mlada, which were two theatrical works that diverted Borodin's attention from the B minor symphony between 1869–75. According to the account of Borodin's friend Nikolay Kashkin, the symphony's striking and abrupt opening theme originated from the abandoned chorus of Polovtsians, and the Soviet biographer Serge Dianin notes that there is a common thread present in all three pieces. According to Dianin, "it is for this reason that we find certain similarities in the themes Borodin uses in these works." The relation to the heroic world of Prince Igor led Stasov to nickname the work the "Bogatirskaya simfoniya" ("Heroic symphony").

=== I. Allegro moderato ===
Excluding the E natural, the opening theme is made up of an octatonic subcollection which consists of the major and minor 3rd above the tonic. The alternation between major and minor thirds is found throughout the symphony, and is based on this opening theme. The lyrical second theme in D major not only sets a contrast to the first theme, but also to present the cyclic elements evident in the whole work. This is very recognizable in the trio of the scherzo movement, and distantly echoed in the finale. Maes states that the second theme is a protyazhnaya stylization, which he defines as "a splendid form of melismatically decorated song set to poetry of great expressive power and lyrical intensity."

The second theme in the recapitulation is also in E♭ (a diminished fourth away from the opening theme), making it an enharmonic major third above B natural. This makes the interchange between the major and minor third not only melodic, but structural as well.

Musicologist A. Peter Brown notes that the first movement is a sonata form, shaped by a somewhat unusual key scheme in the recapitulation, and provides the following analysis of the first movement.

	Primary	Secondary	Closing		Pr.	Sec.		Cl.
Exposition:	B minor	D		Recapitulation:	B minor	E♭	C	B minor
	1	78	93		224	263		283

While Borodin treats the exposition in a typical manner, S in the recapitulation does not return to the tonic key or even to a closely related key. Instead, he uses two keys (E♭ and C) which are not only distant from B minor, but also unrelated to the tonic key of S in the exposition. Brown concludes with the following thoughts about the first movement:

For a supposedly dilettante composer who had little training in the academic studies of musical composition, this first movement is a significant accomplishment. Though it has virtually no polyphony, Borodin has sustained this piece with attractive melodies motivically interrelated, a large-scale sense of rhythm, effective orchestration in the revised version, and idiosyncratic use of harmony and modulation, particularly in the recapitulation. This masterly first movement is a considerable advance over that of his First Symphony, whose high originality made it at times less effective.

In spite of the first movement's sonata-like form, according to Brown, musicologist Francis Maes states that because of a compulsive repetition of the motto – in sequences, diminutions, and augmentations – the orchestration – with intensive use of the low brass – and the peculiarity of tempo changes, "all this turns the first movement into a montage of contrasts rather than into a developing sonata form." Despite this apparent conflict, music critic David Fanning argues that Borodin's use of melodic material, and the heroic themes that result, are "virtually unprecedented in the history of the symphony."

=== II. Scherzo. Molto vivo ===
The second movement is unconventional in many ways, as it moves to the key of F major – a very remote key; which may have been Balakirev's idea originally. It breaks from the usual triple meter, and it groups together unusual lengths of phrases. Instead, Borodin opts for 1/1 time with a tempo marking of 108 – four quarter notes to a bar with a whole note receiving the beat – and alternates between four and five bar phrases, with an occasional one or two bar phrase. There is a great deal of rhythmic contrast between the two main ideas; the first is firmly on the beat, while the second is syncopated.

After a four bar introduction, a majority of the Scherzo proper is a continuation of quarter note figures passed throughout the orchestra in a "kaleidoscope of color." Dianin notes that the second subject in this passage ends in an unusual fashion, marked by descending leaps of a fourth; while Maes points out the recollection of Glinka, particularly the oriental-sounding Trio (Allegretto). Following the transition to the Allegretto section in 6/4, we have the second main theme. Brown had the following thoughts of this portion of the second movement:

Perhaps, this Allegretto is a Russian Barcarolle with its lilting rhythms in compound-duple meter, mild hemiolas, and a melody marked cantabile e dolce. Borodin's orchestration of the background is almost Klangfarben with harp, triangle, and horns providing a pointilistic accompaniment. The form builds through repetitions of its four-measure theme with changes to its background in good kuchkist fashion.

Following the Allegretto is a return of the Scherzo proper, which Rimsky-Korsakov found to be the weak link in the symphony.

=== III. Andante ===
According to Borodin's friend and chief biographer Vladimir Stasov, the third movement of the symphony was intended to depict the Slavic minstrel Boyan accompanying himself on a gusli (a type of zither), represented by the harp. While this movement is similar to the third movement of his first symphony, the structure differs being rondo-like:

Introd.	A	B	A	C(A)	B	A	B	A	Introd.
D♭		E minor	A♭	A	D♭				
1	5	23	46	80	87	91	101	113	121

The Andante begins with what Oldani calls "one of Borodin's most serene melodies," played by solo clarinet and accompanied by the harp, and what follows is a horn solo with the ornamental grace notes that are quite typical of Borodin's lyrical melodies. This melody is heard from various instruments throughout the piece, while some of the material incorporates the interaction between minor and major thirds present in the Allegro (I).

The movement ends in a similar fashion to how it began, with clarinet solo followed by horn solo, accompanied by harp. Maes eloquently summarizes the mystique of the third movement by pointing out how powerfully it refers to the "mythical, imaginary world of both Ruslan and Prince Igor." It leads directly into the finale without a break.

=== IV. Finale. Allegro ===
According to Oldani the finale is in sonata form, but more free than the first movement. However, Brown points out that there are at least three viable ways to interpret the formal structure of this movement: 1) in the standard western tradition of the symphony with the movement being either in sonata or rondo form; 2) as a collection of dances that mimic sonata form; 3) as a programmatic piece that follows the events laid out by Stasov. This section begins with a pentatonic theme in the violin and viola, with the development consisting of a whole-tone passage which is also used in both Mlada and the prologue of Prince Igor.

Intr.	Pr. Trans.(Intr.)	Sec.	Clos.(Sec.)	Pr. aug.	Trans.(Intr.)	Pr.	New 1	Intr.	Pr. Trans.(Intr.) Sec./Clos.	New 2	New 1	1N1	Intr./Pr.
Introd.	Exposition			Development					Recapitulation	Coda			
1	18 44	53	76	96	102	118	149	168	184 201 208	232	251	257	265

Stasov states that this movement is a scene of great celebration, which Borodin conveys by writing Slavic dances in mixed triple and duple meter, and syncopated downbeats. These elements, combined with the addition of cymbals, triangle, tambourine, and bass drum, give the music not only a Slavic dance feel, but also makes it "Turkish" sounding to western ears. Each dance has its own bold rhythmic motion which is a result of the syncopation, as well as the resilient anacrustic formations; Dianin describes the tone of the movement as being "bright and jubilant."

=== Summary ===
According to Dianin, Stasov believed that Borodin had the knights and heroic figures of ancient Russia in mind with this piece. "The first movement depicts an assembly of Russian knights […] the Scherzo could be intended to suggest a headlong chase, but it could equally well be a festive scene […] the third movement was to have depicted Bayan, the legendary minstrel who appears in the Lay of Igor's Campaign […] and the finale is meant to depict ‘the knights’ feast, the sound of the gusli, and a jubilant throng of people."

Dianin concludes by stating that the overall character of Borodin's Symphony No. 2 is patriotic, and that he is showing his sincere admiration for the strength and courage of the men of old, who "saved Russia from her enemies." Borodin not only admired these great heroes of Russian history, but was able to capture their essence in his music. In summing up the work, Brown had the following comment:

The Second Symphony proved to be Borodin's great work. Whatever Borodin's technical limitations as a composer, they fail to be revealed in this symphony. The power, the playfulness, the lyricism, and the liveliness incorporated into each of the movements make for a compelling gesture.

== Selected discography ==
- London Symphony Orchestra, Albert Coates (EMI, 1929/1931)
- NBC Symphony Orchestra, Arturo Toscanini (Relief, TIM CD, broadcast 26 Feb. 1938)
- Minneapolis Symphony Orchestra (now the Minneapolis Orchestra), Dimitri Mitropoulos (Columbia Records 78s & Lp, Nickson CD, 7 December 1941)
- Hallé Orchestra, Constant Lambert (His Master's Voice/EMI 78s, Dutton CD, 1943)
- Moscow Radio Symphony Orchestra, Nikolai Golovanov (21st Century Sound, 1948)
- Minneapolis Symphony Orchestra (now the Minneapolis Orchestra), Antal Dorati (Mercury LP only, 19 Feb. 1952 – mono)
- New York Philharmonic, Dimitri Mitropoulos, (Columbia Records LP, 1952 – mono)
- Orchestre de la Suisse Romande, Ernest Ansermet (Decca, 11 Nov. 1954 – 1st stereo version)
- Philharmonia Orchestra, Nicolai Malko (His Master's Voice Lp, IMG/EMI CD, 22 Sept. 1955)
- Royal Concertgebouw Orchestra, Kirill Kondrashin (Philips, 1980)
- Philharmonia Orchestra, Paul Kletzki (Testament – mono)
- Staatskapelle Dresden, Kurt Sanderling (1961)
- Vienna Philharmonic, Rafael Kubelík (EMI)
- London Symphony Orchestra, Jean Martinon (Decca)
- Stuttgart Radio Symphony Orchestra, Carlos Kleiber (Hänssler, live, 12 Dec. 1972)
- Toronto Symphony Orchestra, Andrew Davis (Newton Classics)
- National Philharmonic Orchestra, Loris Tjeknavorian (RCA, 1977)
- Bratislava Radio Symphony Orchestra, Stephen Gunzenhauser (Naxos)
- New Russian Orchestra, Oleg Poltevsky (Bel Air Music)
- Rotterdam Philharmonic Orchestra, Valery Gergiev (Decca)
- Gothenburg Symphony Orchestra, Neeme Järvi (Decca)
- Royal Philharmonic Orchestra, Vladimir Ashkenazy (Decca)
- Rome RAI Orchestra, José Serebrier (ASV)
- State of Mexico Symphony Orchestra, Enrique Batiz (Asv Living Era)
- Royal Stockholm Philharmonic Orchestra, Gennady Rozhdestvensky (Brilliant Classics)
- Russian State Symphony, Evgeni Svetlanov (Melodiya)
- Samara Philharmonic Orchestra, Samuel Friedman (Arte Nova)
- Berlin Philharmonic, Simon Rattle (EMI)
- Dresden Philharmonic, Michel Plasson (Berlin Classics)
- Seattle Symphony, Gerard Schwarz (Naxos)

Royal Philharmonic Orchestra, Ole Schmidt (Regis)

== Bibliography ==
- Abraham, Gerald. Borodin: The Composer and His Music. London, William Reeves, 1927.
- ________. Foreword to Alexander Borodin. Symphony No. 2 in B minor. London: Ernst Eulenburg, 193-?.
- Borodin, Alexander. Symphony No. 2 in B minor. London: Ernst Eulenburg, 193-?.
- Brown, A. Peter. Approaching Musical Classicism: Understanding Styles and Style Change in Eighteenth-Century Instrumental Music. United States: College Music Society, 1980.
- Brown, A. Peter, with Brian Hart. The European Symphony from ca. 1800 to ca. 1930, vol. 3 part B: Great Britain, Russia, and France. Bloomington: Indiana University Press, 2008.
- Dianin, Serge. Borodin. Transl. Robert Lord. London: Oxford University Press, 1963.
- Fanning, David. "Building a Library; Borodin's Symphony No. 2." BBC Music Magazine. Vol. 5, no. 8. (1997): 46–47.
- Greenwalt, Terrence Lee. "A Study of the Symphony in Russia from Glinka to the Early Twentieth Century." PhD, University of Rochester, Eastman School of Music, 1972.
- Lloyd-Jones, David. "Towards a Scholarly Edition of Borodin's Symphonies." Soundings: A Music Journal, 6 (1977): 81–87.
- Maes, Francis. A History of Russian Music: From Kamarinskaya to Babi Yar. Translated by Arnold J. Pomerans and Erica *Pomerans. Berkeley: University of California Press, 2002.
- Oldani, Robert W. "Borodin, Aleksandr Porfir’yevich," Grove Music Online, from http://www.oxfordmusiconline.com: Internet; accessed 10 March 2009.
