= Mlada (Rimsky-Korsakov) =

Opera-ballet by Nikolai Rimsky-Korsakov

- Opera-ballet by Nikolai Rimsky-Korsakov
- Fyodor Stravinsky as Mstivoy in the premiere
- Native title: Russian: Млада
- Librettist: Viktor Krylov
- Language: Russian
- Premiere: 1892; Mariinsky Theatre, St. Petersburg

Mlada (Russian: Млада, romanized: Mláda) is an opera-ballet in four acts, composed between 1889 and 1890 by Nikolai Rimsky-Korsakov, to a libretto by Viktor Krylov that was originally destined for an aborted project of the same name from 1872. The composer was "somewhat ahead of his time, in that he combined within one scenic whole song, movement, dance, decor, reality and make-believe. Both real people and their 'souls' appear: the physical world alternates with the mystical, the commonplace with the magical, and dry land with water-the transformations are continuous."

"In the middle of Rimsky-Korsakov's Mlada, a fantasy tale about ancient pagan Slavs, the spectators suddenly find themselves in the palace of Cleopatra. The Egyptian scene exudes sensuality ...." Rimsky-Korsakov said, "Among my musical impressions of Paris [at the World Exhibition, summer 1889] I reflect on music in Hungarian and Algerian cafes. The virtuoso playing of a Hungarian orchestra on tsevnitsas (Pan flutes) gave me the idea of introducing this ancient instrument ... during the dances at Cleopatra's. In an Algerian cafe, I was attracted to the beat of a large drum .... This effect I also borrowed for the scene of Cleopatra."

== Performance history ==
The St. Petersburg premiere of Rimsky-Korsakov's setting of the libretto was given on 1 November 1892 and conducted by Eduard Nápravník. The scene designers were Ivan Andreyev and Mikhail Bocharov; balletmasters were Lev Ivanov and Enrico Cecchetti. The first production of Mlada was not a success, and it did not become a regular repertory item. (The decor, however, was reused for Petipa's 1896 revival of the ballet adaptation of the scenario by composer Ludwig Minkus, which had premiered in 1879).

Other notable performances of Rimsky-Korsakov's Mlada were given in 1904 in St. Petersburg in the Great Hall of the St. Petersburg Conservatory by Tsereteli's opera company; in 1913 in Moscow by the Zimin Opera; and in 1923 in Petrograd at the State Theatre of Opera and Ballet.

On 25 December 1988 a new production was mounted at the Bolshoi by its director Alexander Lazarev with designer Valery Levental, producer Boris Pokrovsky and ballet-master Andrei Petrov. The cast included Makvala Kasrashvili as Voislava, Oleg Kul'ko as Yaromir, Galina Borisova as Morena, Boris Morozov as Prince Mstivoi, and the ghost of Mlada and Cleopatra were danced by Nina Ananiashvili; it was also issued on video and DVD directed by Barrie Gavin.

A semi-staged complete performance was given at the Barbican in London in May 1989 by the London Symphony Orchestra conducted by Michael Tilson Thomas with Sergei Leiferkus, Makvala Kasrashvili, Edward R. White jnr, Felicity Palmer, and Alfreda Hodgson among the cast. The Bolshoy production was performed in a 4,000-seat venue as part of Glasgow's 1990 European City of Culture festival, which also marked the first British appearance of the Bolshoy Opera.

== Roles ==
Role	Voice type	Premiere cast 1 November 1892 (Conductor: Eduard Nápravník)
Mstivoy, prince of Rethra	bass	Fyodor Stravinsky
Voyslava, his daughter	soprano	Evelina Sonki
Yaromir, prince of Arkona	tenor	Mikhail Mikhaylov
Shade of Princess Mlada	dancer	Marie Petipa
Lumir, Czech singer	alto	Mariya Dolina
Morena, goddess of the underworld, appearing in the first act in the form of the old woman Svyatokhna	mezzo-soprano	Maria Piltz
The Moor from the Caliphate	tenor	Vasily Karelin
The Novgorodian	tenor	Grigory Ugrinovich
Wife of the Novgorodian	mezzo-soprano	Elena Markovskaya
A Varangian	baritone	Maksim Titov
Tiun	bass	Aleksandr Klimov
High Priest of Radegast	baritone	V.N. Yefimov
Chornobog	chorus of basses	
Kashchéy the Immortal	chorus of tenors	
Chumá (Plague), god of pestilence	silent role	
Cherv' (Worm), god of famine	silent role	
Topelets, god of floods	silent role	
Shade of Queen Cleopatra	dancer	
Chorus, silent roles: Maidens, armor-bearers and retinue of Mstivoy, merchants, supplicators, people of various Slavic lands, priests and priestesses of Radegast, trumpeters, wood-sprites, werewolves, kikimoras, witches, ghosts of the deceased, ghosts of dancers, of black male and female slaves of Queen Cleopatra, spectres of bogatïrs, Slavic gods

Mariya Skorsyuk as the shade of Queen Cleopatre (Mariinsky Theatre, St. Petersburg, 1892)

== Synopsis ==
Time: The ninth or tenth century
Place: The Slavic lands of the Baltic sea-coast, in the city of Rethra, near the Labe (Elbe) river, in modern-day Germany.

=== Act 1 ===
Voyslava has killed Mlada, Yaromir's bride, with a poisoned wedding-ring, in order to have him for herself but he rejects her. Voyslava's old nurse offers to support her provided she pledges allegiance to Morena, the goddess of the underworld. When Prince Yaromir comes by his followers to celebrate mid-summer Morena's bewitches him, but in his enchanted sleep he has a vision of Voyslava murdering Mlada with a poisoned ring.

=== Act 2 ===
At the midsummer folk festival near the city of Rethra the people dance. Entry of the princes. The priest of the god Radegast prophesies by means of a horse oracle. In the circle of dancing couples, the spirit of Mlada intervenes between Yaromir and Voyslava. Yaromir rushes off after Mlada and Voyslava curses Morena who spell has failed to overcome Yaromir's love.

=== Act 3 ===
By night Mlada leads Yaromir up Mount Triglav, where the dead gather, and he begs her to welcome him to the spirit word. With thunder and a crimson moon the Witches' Sabbath commences. Chernobog conjures a vision of Cleopatra for Yaromir but at cock's crow he decides to return to the Temple of Radegast and ask assistance from the priests.

=== Act 4 ===
Yaromir, at the Temple of Radegast, is shown by the spirits that Voyslava is guilty. She arrives and confesses her sin while saying it was her love for him to caused it; he kills her with his sword. With her last breath she calls on Morena, with whom Voyslava had made a compact, who destroys the temple and the city of Rethra with storms and an earthquake, but Yaromir is united with Mlada in heaven.

== Concert excerpts ==
Two orchestral works were derived from the opera by the composer. The first, Night on Mt. Triglav, is an arrangement of Act 3. The second is a suite.

- Suite from the Opera-Ballet Mlada (1894)
1. Introduction
2. Redowa: A Bohemian Dance
3. Lithuanian Dance
4. Indian Dance
5. Cortège

The Redowa appears in Act 1. The Lithuanian Dance and the Indian Dance are taken from Act 2, Scene 5. The cortège is the well-known Procession of the Nobles (Russian: Шествие князей, literally, Procession of the Princes), and appears in Act 2, Scene 3.

- Night on Mt. Triglav (1899–1901)

This is a purely orchestral arrangement of Act III, restyled as a lengthy symphonic poem for orchestra. Approximately a half-hour in duration, the program in the printed score follows the action of the opera during the corresponding act of the opera.

== Instrumentation ==
Piccolo, 2 Flutes, Alto Flute (doubles on 3rd flute), 2 Oboes, English Horn, 3 Clarinets, Bass Clarinet, 3 Bassoons (3rd doubles on Contrabassoon), 6 Horns, 3 Trumpets, 3 Trombones, Tuba, Timpani, Bass Drum, Cymbals, Triangle, Side Drum, Strings.

== Use in broadcast media ==
"Procession of the Nobles" was used as the theme for the PBS public affairs program Agronsky & Co. and its successor, Inside Washington, and was used between 1957 and 1969 as the opening theme for the UK TV programme What the Papers Say.

== Recordings ==
role key: conductor/Voyslava/Morena/Yaromir/Mstivoy

- Yevgeny Svetlanov/Tugarinova/Kulagina/Makhov/Korolyov, 1962, audio studio, with Tatyana Tugarinova (Voyslava), Nina Kulagina (Morena), Vladimir Makhov (Yaromir), Alexey Korolyov (Mstivoy), Moscow Radio Symphony Chorus, Moscow Radio Symphony Orchestra, Melodiya
- Alexander Lazarev/Kasrashvili/Borisova/Kulko/Nikolsky, 1989, Moscow video, Videoland
- Lazarev/Gavrilova/Borisova/Kulko/Nikolsky, 1992, Moscow video, Teldec
- Michael Tilson Thomas/Kazarnovskaya/Poretsky/Grigorian/Martirossian, 2002, live in San Francisco, pirate
- Valery Gergiev/Khudoley/Savova/Armonov/Petrenko-M, 2004, live in Amsterdam, Premiere Opera
