= List of symphonies in B minor =

This is a list of symphonies in the key of B minor.

Composer	Symphony
Anton Arensky	Symphony No. 1, Op. 4 (1883)
Kurt Atterberg	Symphony No. 1, Op. 3 (1909–11)
Carl Philipp Emanuel Bach	Symphony in B minor, Wq.182:5 / H661 (1773)
Wilhelm Berger	Symphony No. 2, Op. 80
Alexander Borodin	Symphony No. 2 (1869, rev 1877)
Rutland Boughton	Symphony No. 3 (1937)
Fritz Brun	Symphony No. 1 (1908)
Paul Büttner	Symphony No. 4 (1918)
Alfredo Casella	Symphony No. 1, Op. 5 (1905-6)
Edward Joseph Collins	Symphony Nos habebit humus (1929)
Claude Debussy	Symphony in B minor (1880-1, two movements for piano four-hands, first movement orchestrated by Tony Finno)
Cornelis Dopper	Symphony No. 2 (1903)
Wilhelm Furtwängler	Symphony No. 1 (1938–1941, premiere 18 January 2000)
Niels Gade	Symphony No. 8, Op. 47 (1871)
Florian Leopold Gassmann	Symphony (1769)
Reinhold Glière	Symphony No. 3, "Ilya Muromets", Op. 42 (1908-11)
Alexander Gretchaninov	Symphony No. 1, Op. 6 (1894)
Henry Kimball Hadley	Symphony No. 3, Op. 60 (1906)
Alfred Hill	Symphony No. 3 "Australia" (1951)
Jānis Ivanovs	Symphony No. 8 (1956)
Jan Kalivoda	Symphony No. 5 Op. 106 (1840/1?)
Heino Kaski	Symphony (1919)
Rued Langgaard	Symphony No. 1 BVN 32 (1908–11)
Sergei Lyapunov	Symphony No. 1, Op. 12 (1887)
Borys Lyatoshynsky	Symphony No. 2, Op. 26 (1935–36, rev. 1940); Symphony No. 3, Op. 50 (1951, rev 1955 with a new finale)
Miguel Marqués	Symphony No. 3
Aarre Merikanto	Symphony No. 1, Op. 5 (1916)
Vano Muradeli	Symphony No. 1 "To the Memory of Kirov" (1938)
Nikolai Myaskovsky	Symphony No. 7, Op. 24 (1921-2) (nominally in the key); Symphony No. 22, Op. 54 (1941)
Ludolf Nielsen	Symphony No. 1, Op. 3 (1902/03)
Karl von Ordonez	Symphony Brown I:Bm1
Ignacy Jan Paderewski	Symphony "Polonia", Op. 24 (completed 1908)
Hubert Parry	'Symphonic Fantasia 1912' (Symphony No. 5) (1912)
Wilhelm Peterson-Berger	Symphony No. 5 Solitude (1932–33)
Ernst Rudorff	Symphony No. 3, Op. 50 (1910)
Johann Rufinatscha	Symphony No. 4 (1846)
Joly Braga Santos	Symphony No. 2, Op. 13 (1948)
Martin Scherber	Symphony No. 3 (1952–55)
Franz Schubert	Symphony No. 8, D 759 "Unfinished"
Dmitri Shostakovich	Symphony No. 6, Op. 54 (1939)
Leo Sowerby	Symphony No. 2
Louis Spohr	Symphony No. 9, Op. 143 'Die Jahreszeiten' (1850)
Heikki Suolahti	Sinfonia Piccola (1935)
Yevgeny Svetlanov	Symphony No. 1, Op. 13 (1956)
Wilhelm Taubert	Symphony, Op.80 (pub. 1851)
Pyotr Ilyich Tchaikovsky	Manfred Symphony, Op. 58 (1885); Symphony No. 6, Op. 74 "Pathétique"
Charles Tournemire	Symphony No. 8, Op. 51 "La Triomphe de la Mort"
Max Trapp	Symphony No. 2, Op. 15
Eduard Tubin	Symphony No. 2 (1937) Symphony No. 5 (1946)
Mieczysław Weinberg	Symphony No. 3, Op. 45 (1949-50, rev 1959)
Felix Weingartner	Symphony No. 6, Op. 74 "in Gedenken des 19. November 1828"
Louis Vierne	Organ Symphony No. 6, Op. 59 (1930)

== See also ==
- Sonata in B minor (disambiguation)
- String Quartet in B minor (disambiguation)
- Category:Compositions in B minor
