= Veselka (surname) =

Veselka is a surname. Czech: Veselka means a 'wedding', Ukrainian: Веселка means a 'rainbow'. Notable people with the surname include:

- Chris Veselka (born 1970), American soccer player
- Stefan Veselka (born 1968), Norwegian classical pianist and conductor
- Vanessa Veselka (born 1969), American writer
