= Stepan Gedeonov =

Russian art scholar, playwright, critic and historian

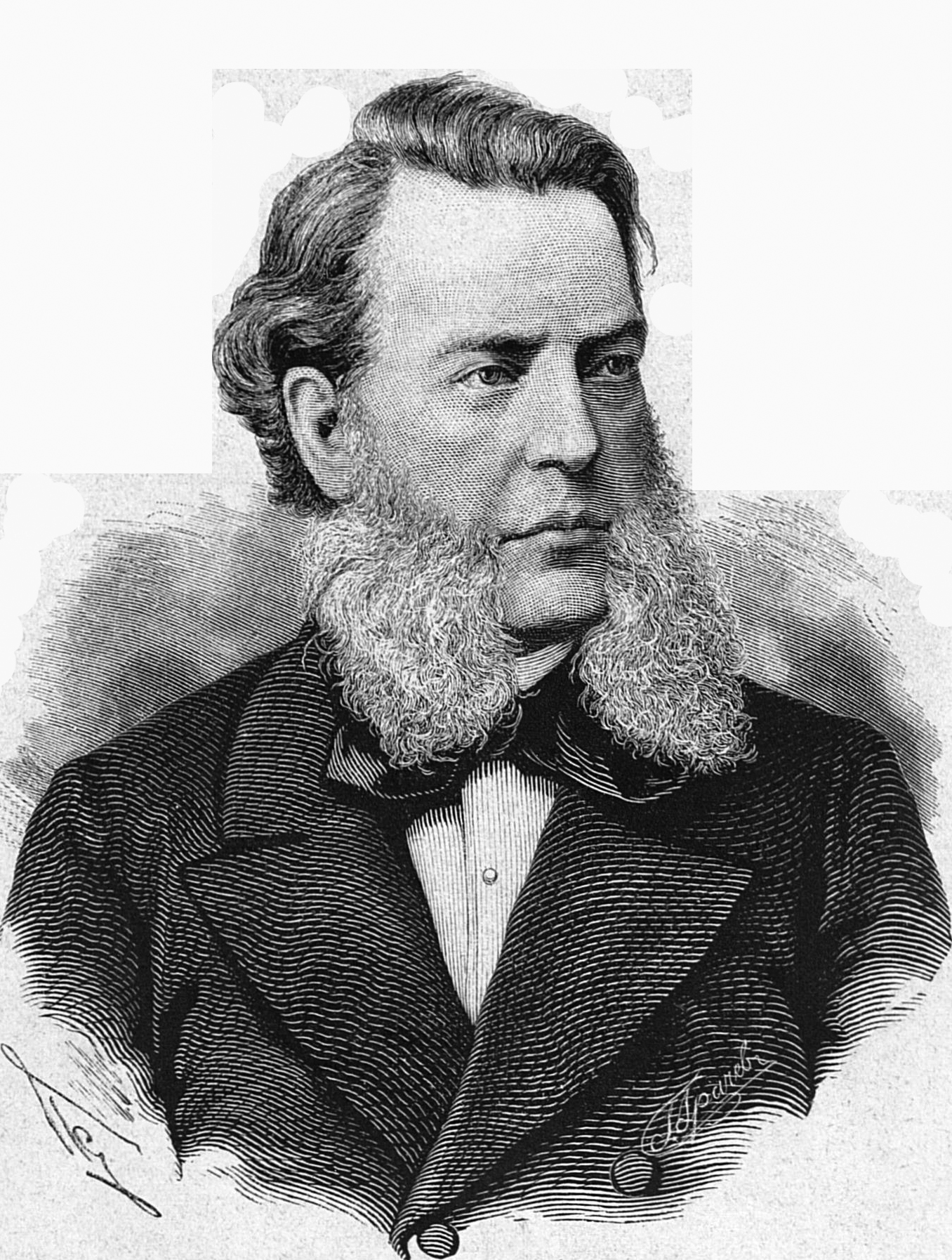
- Portarait by Pyotr Borel; Vsemirnaya Illustratsiya, 1881
- Born: Степан Александрович Гедеонов; 13 June 1816; Saint Petersburg, Russian Empire
- Died: 27 September 1878 (aged 62); Saint Petersburg, Russian Empire
- Occupations: historian, art and theatre critic
- Awards: Uvarov Prize (1876)

Stepan Alexandrovich Gedeonov (Russian: Степан Александрович Гедеонов; 13 June 1816 – 17 September 1878) was a Russian art scholar, playwright, critic and historian. He was the director of the Hermitage Museum in 1863–1878 and Russian Imperial Theatres in 1867—1875.

== Life ==
Gedeonov was born on 13 June 1816 in Saint Petersburg.

In 1863, Gedeonov was elected the honourable member of the Saint Petersburg Academy of Sciences. As a historian, he is best known for his 1876 anti-Normanist 2-volume magnum opus Varangians and Rus (Варяги и Русь) which won him the Uvarov Prize of that year.

Reportedly not keen on the Russian drama, Gedeonov (as the head of the Imperial Theatres) did little to foster its development. He strongly supported, though, Italian opera and was instrumental in getting several prominent Italian singers to perform in the Russian capital.

Gedeonov had at least one musical project of his own, Mlada. The idea was revised in 1872 as a 4-act opera-ballet, with a libretto by Viktor Krylov. The composition of the score was divided between César Cui, Modest Mussorgsky, Nikolai Rimsky-Korsakov and Alexander Borodin. The project was never completed, Ludwig Minkus came up with a ballet of the same name which was produced by Marius Petipa in Saint Petersburg in 1879. Later Rimsky-Korsakov revived the original idea and wrote his own ballet-opera Mlada, premiered in 1892.

Vasilisa Melentyeva, the play that Gedeonov wrote later in his life, suffered a somewhat similar fate. Dissatisfied with his own effort, he passed the text to Alexander Ostrovsky, and the latter used the plot to write the completely new play of the same title.

Gedeonov authored one original play, The Death of Lyapunov (Смерть Ляпунова, 1845) which was produced by Alexandrinsky Theatre and had considerable success, running for 18 performances in its first season. Later, as the director of the Imperial Theatres, Gedeonov refused to give the permission for it to be produced, describing it as his 'childish fallacy'.
