= Sonata in B minor =

Sonata in B minor may refer to:

== Piano sonatas in B minor ==
- Piano Sonata No. 3 (Chopin)
- Piano Sonata in B minor (Liszt)
- Piano Sonata No. 2 (Shostakovich)
- Piano Sonata in B minor (Strauss)

== Other sonatas in B minor ==
- Sonata in B minor (Atterberg), for string instrument or horn with piano, by Kurt Atterberg
- Sonata in B minor (Scarlatti), for harpsichord, by Domenico Scarlatti, part of Essercizi per gravicembalo, with Kirkpatrick number K.27
- Sonata No. 1 in B minor, BMV 1014, for violin and harpsichord, by Johann Sebastian Bach
- Flute Sonata in B minor, BWV 1030, for flute and obbligato harpsichord, by Johann Sebastian Bach
- Violin Sonata in B minor (Respighi), for violin and piano, by Ottorino Respighi

== See also ==
- String Quartet in B minor (disambiguation)
- List of symphonies in B minor
- Category:Compositions in B minor
