= Piano Sonata in B minor (Strauss) =

Piano sonata composed by Richard Strauss

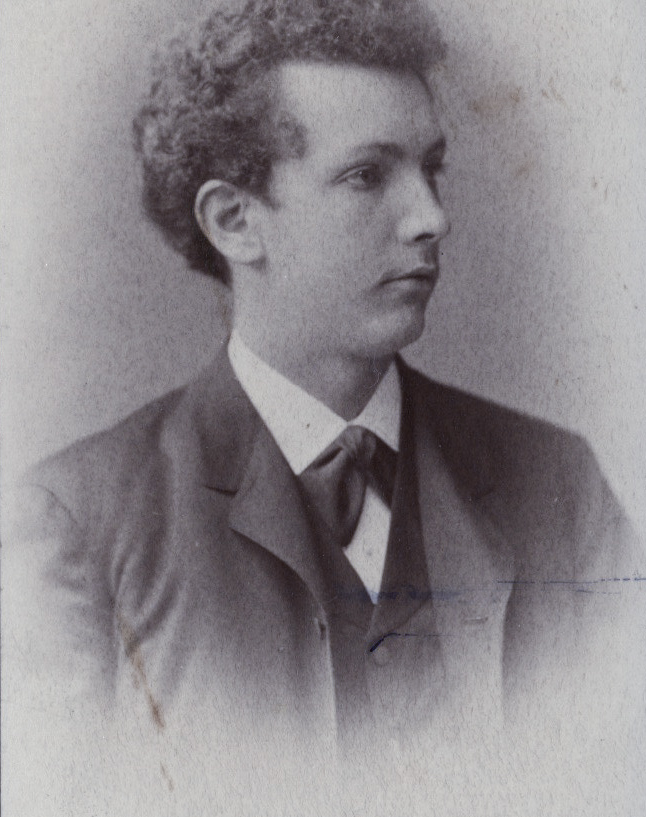
Strauss in 1886, four years after writing the Piano Sonata

Sonata in B minor for piano
Part 1

Part 2

Part 3

Part 4
All played by Tjako van Schie

The Piano Sonata in B minor, Op.5, was written by Richard Strauss in 1880–81. The Sonata is in the Romantic style of his teenage years.

== Composition ==
The Piano Sonata is in four movements:

1. Allegro molto appassionato
2. Adagio cantabile
3. Scherzo: Presto – Trio: Un poco più lento
4. Finale. Allegretto vivo

The first movement and Finale are in Sonata form. The Adagio is in Ternary form with an ABA structure; the Scherzo is a "full fledged Scherzo in an expanded ABABA form." The first movement is notable for having the main theme based on the repeated note short-short-short long which echoes the rhythm of the Fate motif of Beethoven's Fifth symphony. Larry Todd states that:

The first movement appropriates its familiar four-note head motive from Beethoven's Fifth Symphony. The first movement is fairly saturated with the motive, which appears in the first theme, the bridge and the closing section of the exposition. In addition, much of the development is devoted to a treatment of the motive, and in the closing bars of the movement we find a major key version of the close of Beethoven's first movement".

In the three subsequent movements, "the reliance on Mendelssohn comes more and more to the fore". In particular, Todd argues that Strauss' Adagio Cantabile is effectively a Mendelssohnian Lied ohne Worte (Song without words). In the Scherzo and Finale, one can also find echoes of Mendelssohn, both in terms of structure, time signature and thematic material. The performance time is approximately 27 minutes.

Strauss had been writing pieces for the piano since he was six years old, but the Piano Sonata was the most significant one of three to which he gave an opus number (the other two being his Five piano pieces, Op. 3, written in 1882, and Stimmungsbilder, Op. 9, written in 1884). After 1884 his piano writing was either for piano and orchestra (Burleske in D minor (1886) and Parergon zur Symphonia Domestica (1925)) or as an accompaniment to the voice in Lieder or other instruments.

== Recordings ==
Recordings of the piece include:

CD title (release date)	Pianist	Reference
Richard Strauss: Sonata, Op. 5; Five Piano Pieces, Op. 3 (1954)	Alfred Brendel	SPA Records – SPA 48
Richard Strauss: Sonata In b, Op. 5; Stimmungsbilder, Op. 9 (1971)	Carol Colburn	Orion Records – ORS 7147
Richard Strauss: Sonata, Op. 5; 5 Piano Pieces, Op. 3 (1984)	Glenn Gould	CBS Masterworks – IM 38659
Richard Strauss – Piano Music (2006)	Stefan Veselka	Naxos – 8557713
Emili Blasco plays Berg, Soler & Strauss (2005)	Emili Blasco	Ars Harmonica – AH100
Richard Strauss: Piano Music (1997)	Oleg Marshev	Danacord – DACOCD440
Tigran Alikhanov in Recital	Tigran Alikhanov	Moscow State Conservatory – SMCCD0096
R. Strauss: Complete Chamber Music (2014)	Gitti Pirner	Brilliant Classics – 9231

== Sources ==
- Del Mar, Norman (1986), Richard Strauss: A Critical Commentary on his Life and Works, (second edition), London, Faber and Faber. ISBN 978-0-571-25098-1.
- Todd, Larry (1992), Strauss before Liszt and Wagner, In Richard Strauss: new perspectives on the composer and his work, edited by Bryan Gilliam, Duke University Press, pages 3–40. ISBN 978-0-8223-2114-9.
