= String Quartet in B minor =

String Quartet in B minor may refer to:

- No. 1 of the String Quartets, Op. 33 (Haydn)
- No. 2 of the String Quartets, Op. 64 (Haydn)
- String Quartet No. 18 (Spohr)
- String Quartet No. 1 (Prokofiev)
- String Quartet (Barber)

== See also ==
- Sonata in B minor
- List of symphonies in B minor
- Category:Compositions in B minor
