= The Prisoner of the Caucasus (opera) =

Opera by César Cui

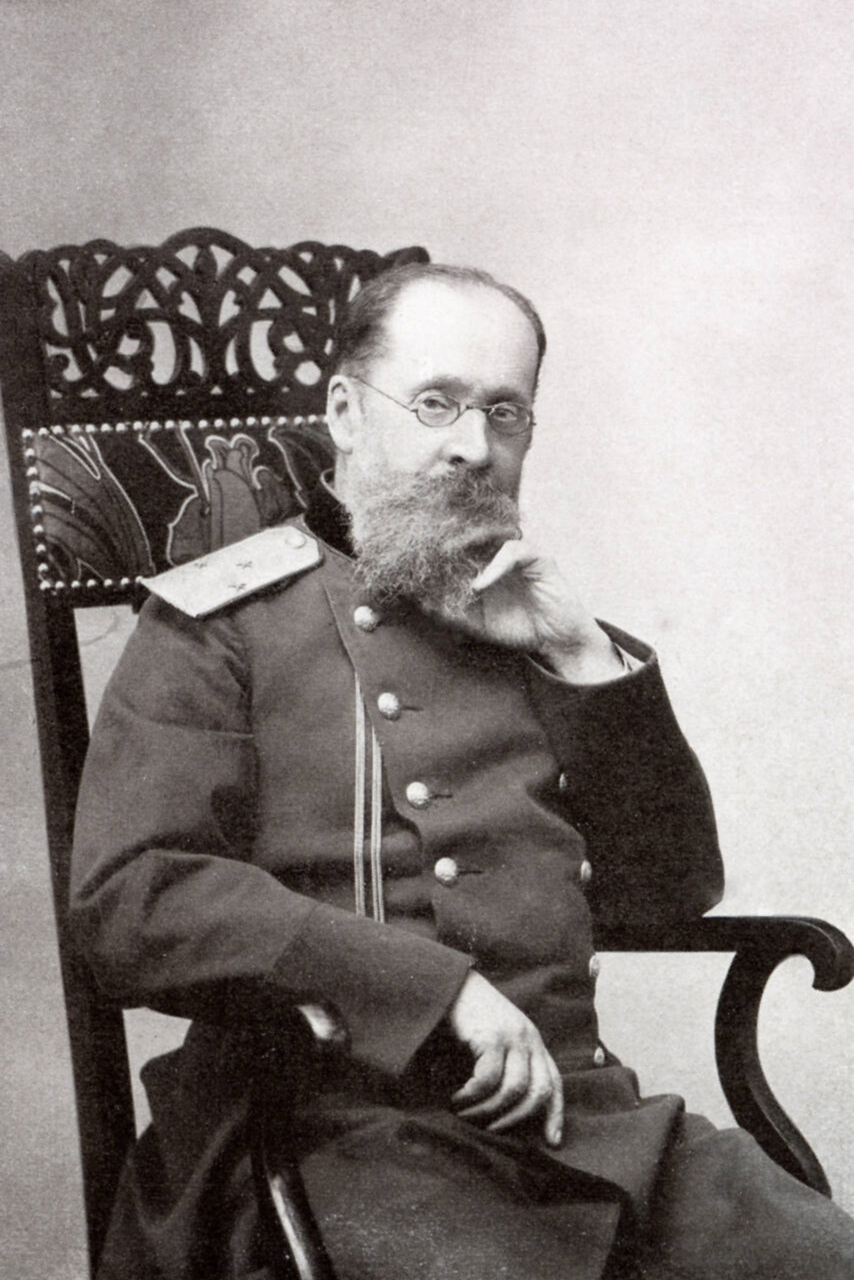
Composer César Cui

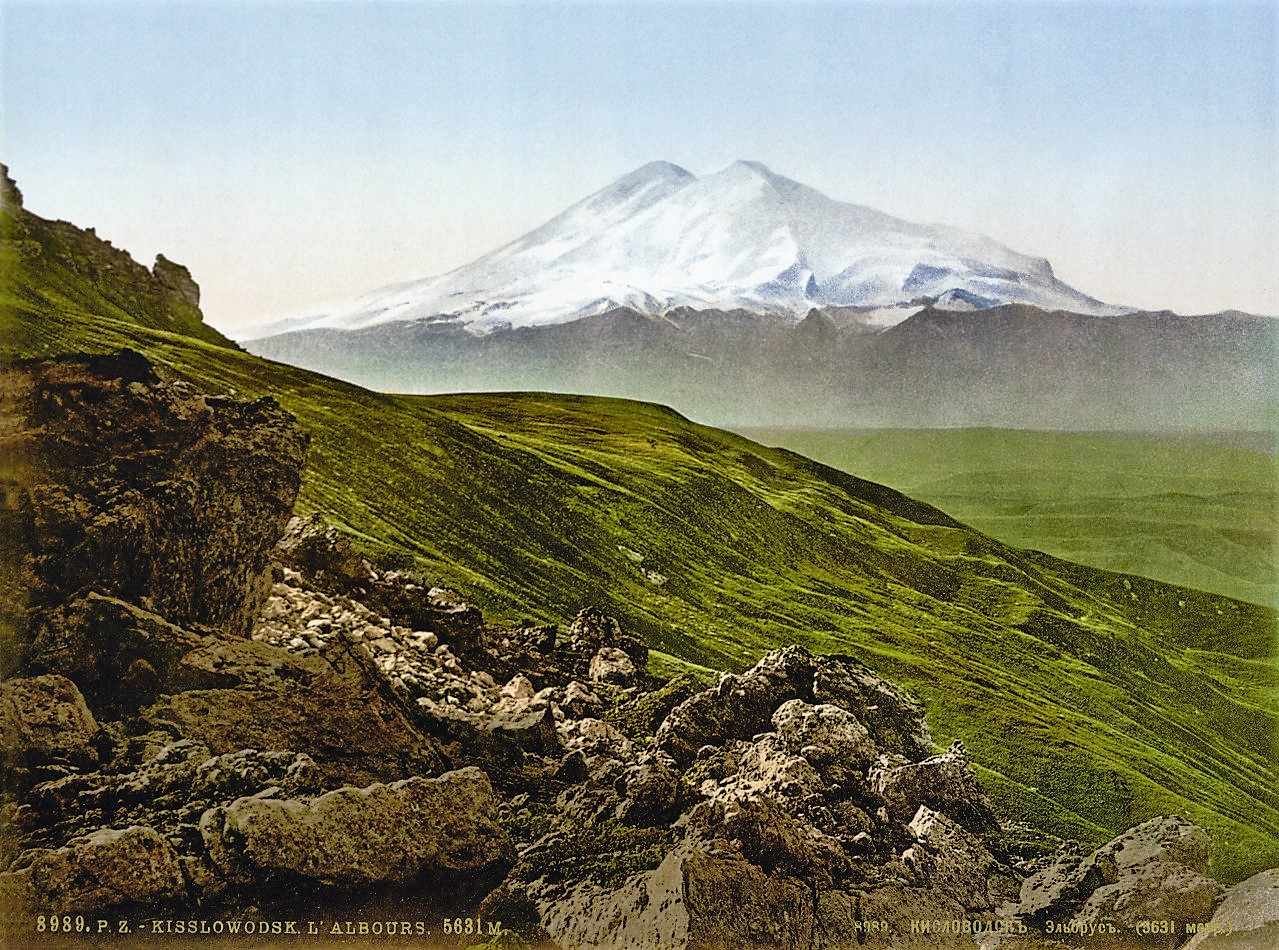
19th-century postcard of Mount Elbrus in the Caucasus Mountains

The Prisoner of the Caucasus (Кавказский пленник in Cyrillic, Kavkazskij plennik in transliteration) is an opera in three acts, composed by César Cui. The libretto is credited to Viktor Krylov, and is based on Alexander Pushkin's 1822 poem The Prisoner of the Caucasus.

The English title has been rendered also as The Prisoner in the Caucasus and The Captive in the Caucasus.

The opera was preceded on the Russian stage by choreographer Charles Didelot's ballet of 1825.

== Composition ==
The opera was composed in three versions. The first, in 1857–1858, consisted of only two acts (which later became Acts I and III), but its staging was cancelled due to poor orchestration and insufficient length. Meanwhile, the overture, orchestrated by Mily Balakirev, could be heard in concerts. Many years later, Cui decided to revise the two-act work: during 1881-1882 he added a new middle act (Act II) and another dance to Act III. This version constituted the score for the Russian premiere. In 1885, with the prospect of a Belgian production, he expanded the finale of Act II, creating the third version of the opera.

== Performance history ==
The Prisoner of the Caucasus was premiered on 4 February 1883 (Old Style), at the Mariinsky Theatre in Saint Petersburg under the conductorship of Eduard Nápravník. This opera became the most widely performed of the composer's full-length operas. Its production in Liège in 1886 — made possible in no small way by the enthusiastic support of Cui's friend, La Comtesse de Mercy-Argenteau — marked the first time that an opera by "The Mighty Handful" was performed in the West. Nevertheless, with this exception, the opera seems to have never been staged outside of Imperial Russia and to have fallen out of the repertory in Russia after the composer's death.

== Roles ==
Role	Voice type	Premiere cast, 4 February 1883 (Conductor: Eduard Nápravník)
Kazenbek	bass	Fyodor Stravinsky
Fatima, his daughter	soprano	M. A. Slavina, F. N. Belinskaya
Mar'iam, her friend	mezzo-soprano	N. A. Fride
Abubeker, Fatima's bridegroom	baritone	I. P. Pryanishnikov
Fekherdin, a mullah	bass	M. M. Koryakin
A Russian prisoner	tenor	M. D. Vasilyev
1st Circassian	tenor	
2nd Circassian	baritone	V. F. Sobolev
2nd mullah	tenor	

== Synopsis ==
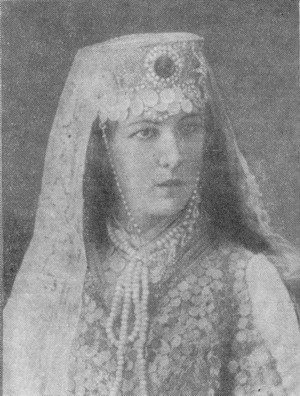
Tsvetkova in the role of Fatima

Place: Caucasus, in a mountain aoul

Act I. After the men of the aoul pray to Allah, Kazenbek tells his melancholy daughter, Fatima, that a bridegroom has been chosen for her. She meditates on her sorrow. Suddenly a crowd of highlanders arrive, bringing along a Russian Prisoner that Fatima's bridegroom has captured as a wedding gift. Fatima begins to sympathize and eventually to fall in love with the Prisoner.

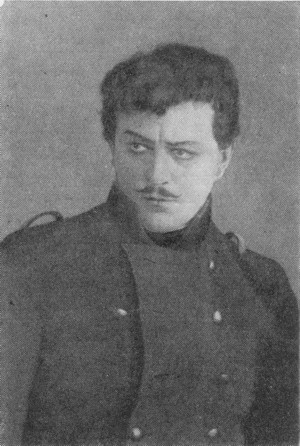
Sobinov as the Prisoner

The Prisoner is left alone until night, when Fatima secretly brings him some food. After they part, a highlander runs in to tell Kazenbek of a group of Russians raiding a nearby aoul. The people come out to join in the combat against the despised enemy.

Act II. A group of women congratulates Fatima on her impending nuptials. After they leave, Fatima reveals her sadness to her friend Mar'iam. Hearing the approaching steps of Kazenbek and Fekherdin, the two of them hide behind a curtain while overhearing the conversation. The mullah has had a dream revealing Fatima's love for the Russian Prisoner. The two men exit.

Then the bridegroom, Abubeker, arrives. He expresses his love for Fatima. She greets him, and gifts from the groom are presented. Abubeker gives the Prisoner to Kazenbek, who hates the Russian. The people condemn the Prisoner to death, which he welcomes to end his suffering.

Act III. At the wedding feast, the people praise the bridegroom. The women, then the men, perform dances. After Mar'iam sings a Circassian song, all exit except for the newlyweds. Fatima is still sad, and Abubeker asks the reason. When they exit, the shackled Prisoner enters. Then Fatima appears; she urges the Prisoner to escape and frees him. He tells her that he loves not her, but another in his homeland. She is devastated as he runs away.

Mar'iam appears and tells Fatima that the entire village is preparing to take revenge on the Russian. The people arrive and are horrified at the news of Fatima's actions. As they set out to kill her, Fatima stabs herself to death. [Note: According to the score, this is the method of Fatima's demise in the opera, not drowning, which is implied in Pushkin's original poem.]

== Notable musical excerpts ==
- Overture
- Aria of Fatima (Act I)
- Aria of the Prisoner (Act I)
- Aria of Abubeker (Act II)
- Dances (Act III)
- Circassian Song (Act III)

== Bibliography ==
- Bernandt, G.B. Словарь опер впервые поставленных или изданных в дореволюционной России и в СССР, 1736-1959 [Dictionary of Operas First Performed or Published in Pre-Revolutionary Russia and in the USSR, 1836-1959] (Москва: Советский композитор, 1962), p. 125-126.
- César, Cui. Кавказский пленник: опера в трех действиях (либретто по Пушкину). Переложение для пения и фортепиано [Prisoner of the Caucasus, opera in three acts (libretto after Pushkin). Piano-vocal score]. Ст.-Петербург: В. Бессель, 1882.
- _______. Le prisonnier du Caucase: opéra en 3 actes. Partition chant et piano. St. Petersbourg, B. Bessel, 1885.
