= Stefan Veselka =

Norwegian musician

Stefan Veselka is a Norwegian classical pianist and conductor.

== Biography and career ==
Stefan Veselka was born in Stavanger, Norway. He studied piano at the Salzburg Mozarteum, and then moved to the Hochschule der Künste in Berlin where he completed his studies. Debuting as a performer in 1985, Veselka has won prizes in many national and international piano competitions, including the Luxemburg European Piano Competition, the Vienna Beethoven International Piano Competition and the Berlin A. Schnabel Competition. In 1988 he was awarded the SHELL Prize.

Veselka has performed in many major venues and festivals, both as soloist and with orchestras. He has performed with the Berliner Philharmonie, Musikverein Wien, and Bridgewater Hall, and at the Berliner Festwochen, at the Ruhr Festival, Festival de Musique Divonne, Schubertiade Feldkirch, Moravian Spring and Piano 2000 Festival. As a conductor, Veselka has performed in opera houses and concerts in cities such as Berlin, Brno, Flensburg, Karlsruhe, Manchester, Osnabrück, Ulm and Stuttgart. He has conducted a number of operas, including Don Giovanni, Werther, Manon, Aida, L`elisir d’Amore, Tosca and Lohengrin.

Veselka has recorded a number of CDs of piano works by Beethoven, Prokofiev, Debussy, Strauss, and Webern, and notably recorded the complete piano works of Dvorak for the Naxos label, which earned him the Classical Internet Award in 2004.
