= Viktor Krylov =

Russian playwright, theatre critic and librettist

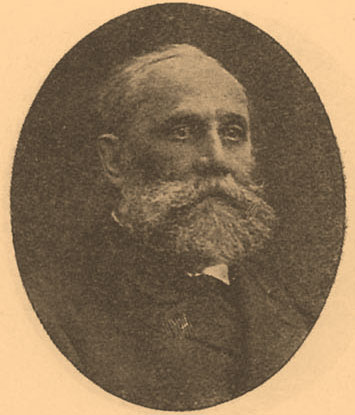
- Born: Виктор Александрович Крылов; February 10, 1838; Moscow, Russian Empire
- Died: March 13, 1908 (aged 70); Saint Petersburg, Russian Empire
- Occupations: playwright, poet, theatre critic, librettist
- Years active: 1877—1903

Viktor Alexandrovich Krylov (Russian: Виктор Александрович Крылов; 2 February 1838 – 13 March 1908) was a Russian playwright (who occasionally used the pen name Viktor Alexandrov), theatre critic, librettist, Imperial Theatres official and one of the major contributors to the Brockhaus and Efron Encyclopedic Dictionary.

== Biography ==
Born in Moscow to a lawyer, Krylov studied at the Moscow Engineering College, where he became friends with fellow student and budding composer César Cui. Krylov started out as a lyricist and wrote verses for several romances composed by Cui, and later, during 1857-1859, wrote the librettos for Cui's operas Prisoner of the Caucasus and The Mandarin's Son, and portions of the libretto for Cui's William Ratcliff.

In 1858 Krylov debuted as a playwright with a comedy based upon Alexander Druzhinin's novella Polinka Saks. In 1862 he published (in Severnaya Ptchela) his first large critical essay on Griboyedov's Woe from Wit and the production of it in the Alexandrinsky Theatre which impressed the head of Sankt-Peterburgskiye Vedomosti Valentin Korsh enough to invite Krylov to contribute regularly to this newspaper's theatre section, which he did in 1863—1865.

His first major play Against the Tides (Против течения, after Mikhail Shchepkin's story) came out in 1864, but it was the 1870 comedy Heading for the Judge (K mirovomu, К мировому) that brought Krylov his first major success prompting him to devote himself to the theatre entirely. Krylov authored more than thirty original plays and almost a hundred lesser works, including re-makes and translations, concentrating on comedy and vaudeville. His best-known non-fiction work was Stolby (Pillars, 1868) which told the story of massive wrongdoings by the landlords, abusing the legal rights of peasant communities. In 1899 with Osip Etinger he dramatised Fyodor Dostoyevsky's The Idiot.

In 1893—1898 Krylov was the head of the head of the Repertoire Department of the Imperial Theatres. "Have you read the article in Russkaya Mysl by V. Krylov? This man loves theatre and I trust him, even if I do not like his plays," Anton Chekhov wrote in a letter to Alexey Suvorin. Krylov's best work were collected in an 8-volume compilation The Dramas by V. Krylov published in Saint Petersburg in 1877—1894, as well as The Poems (Стихотворения, 1898) and The Prose (Проза, in two volumes, 1908).
