= List of symphonies by key =

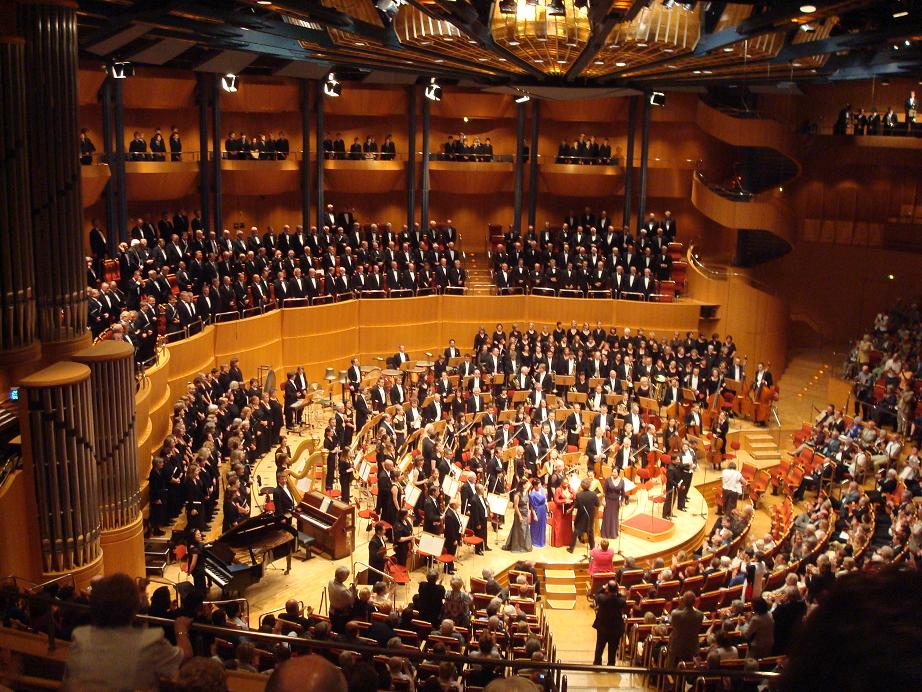
A performance of Gustav Mahler's Eighth Symphony in the Kölner Philharmonie by the Sinfonieorchester Wuppertal conducted by Heinz Walter Florin

This list of symphonies by key is a list of symphonies sorted by key. For the least often used keys in orchestral music, the symphony listed might be famous only for being in that key.

== C major ==
In the Classical period, C major was the key most often chosen for symphonies with trumpets and timpani. Even in the Romantic period, with its greater use of minor keys and the ability to use trumpets and timpani in any key, C major remained a very popular choice of key for a symphony. The following list includes only the most famous examples.

- Ludwig van Beethoven
  - Symphony No. 1, Op. 21 (1800)
- Georges Bizet
  - Symphony in C (1855)
- Paul Dukas
  - Symphony in C (1896)
- Joseph Haydn
  - Symphony No. 7, “Le Midi” (1761)
  - Symphony No. 48, “Maria Theresia” (1769)
  - Symphony No. 82, “The Bear” (1786)
  - Symphony No. 97 (1792)
- Michael Haydn
  - Symphony No. 39, MH 478, Perger 31 (1788)
- Wolfgang Amadeus Mozart
  - Symphony No. 9, KV 73 (1769)
  - Symphony No. 16, KV 128 (1772)
  - Symphony No. 22, KV 162 (1773)
  - Symphony No. 28, KV 200 (1774)
  - Symphony No. 34, KV 338 (1780)
  - Symphony No. 36, "Linz", KV 425 (1783)
  - Symphony No. 41, "Jupiter", KV 551 (1788)
- Sergei Prokofiev
  - Symphony No. 4 (original version), Op. 47, 1930
  - Symphony No. 4 (revised version), Op. 112, 1947
- Franz Schubert
  - Symphony No. 6, D. 589
  - Symphony No. 9, "The Great", D. 944 (1828)
- Robert Schumann
  - Symphony No. 2, Op. 61 (1846)
- Dmitri Shostakovich
  - Symphony No. 7, "Leningrad", Op. 60 (1942)
- Jean Sibelius
  - Symphony No. 3, Op. 52 (1907)
  - Symphony No. 7, Op. 105 (1924)
- Igor Stravinsky
  - Symphony in C (1940)
- Richard Wagner
  - Symphony in C major, WWV 29 (1832)

== C minor ==
The key of C minor was, like most other minor keys, associated with the literary Sturm und Drang movement during the Classical period. But ever since Ludwig van Beethoven's famous Symphony No. 5, Op. 67, of 1808, C minor imparts a symphony in the key a character of heroic struggle. Early classical symphonies in the key typically ended in C minor but with a picardy third for the very final chord. Following Beethoven's precedent, most C minor symphonies of the Romantic period end in C major. Another option is to end in E♭ major (the relative key), as Mahler does in his Second Symphony.

- Ludwig van Beethoven
  - Symphony No. 5, op. 67 (1808)
- Felix Mendelssohn
  - Symphony No. 1, Op. 11 (1824)
- Johannes Brahms
  - Symphony No. 1, Op. 68 (1876)
- Anton Bruckner
  - Symphony No. 1 (1868)
  - Symphony No. 2 (1872)
  - Symphony No. 8 (1887)
- Antonín Dvořák
  - Symphony No. 1 (1865)
- Joseph Haydn
  - Symphony No. 52
  - Symphony No. 95
- Franz Liszt
  - Faust Symphony, S 108 (1857)
- Gustav Mahler
  - Symphony No. 2 "Resurrection" (1894)
- Camille Saint-Saëns
  - Symphony No. 3 "Organ", Op. 78 (1886)
- Franz Schubert
  - Symphony No. 4 "Tragic", D 417
- Alexander Scriabin
  - Symphony No. 2, Op. 29 (1901)
  - Symphony No. 3 "Le Divin Poème", Op. 43 (1904)
- Dmitri Shostakovich
  - Symphony No. 4, Op. 43 (1936)
  - Symphony No. 8, Op. 65 (1943)
- Pyotr Ilyich Tchaikovsky
  - Symphony No. 2 "Little Russian", Op. 17 (1872)
- Alexander Glazunov
  - Symphony No. 6, Op. 58

== C♯ minor ==
Even by Mahler's time, symphonies in C♯ minor were rare. Some of the works listed below might have no claim to fame besides being in this key.

- Arnold Bax
  - Symphony No. 5
- Ernest Bloch
  - Symphony in C♯ minor (1902)
- Joseph Martin Kraus
  - Symphony in C♯ minor, VB 140. Identified by musicologist Bertil H. van Boer in program notes for the Naxos recording as one of only two C♯ minor symphonies written in the 18th century.
- Gustav Mahler
  - Symphony No. 5 (1902) - Mahler objected to this key assignment, preferring none at all
- Nikolai Myaskovsky
  - Symphony No. 2 (1910–11)
- Sergei Prokofiev
  - Symphony No. 7, Op. 131 (1952)
- Ture Rangström
  - Symphony No. 1 August Strindberg in Memoriam (1914)
- Vissarion Shebalin
  - Symphony No. 2 (1929 )

== D♭ major ==
Symphonies in D♭ major are very rare and one has to look beyond the standard core repertoire to find them.

- Erwin Dressel
  - Symphony in D♭ major (1928)
- Anastazy Wilhelm Dreszer
  - Symphony No. 1, Op. 3 (1865)
- Nikolai Myaskovsky
  - Symphony No. 25, Op. 69 (1945-6)
- Ture Rangström
  - Symphony No. 3, "Song under the Stars" (1929)

== D major ==
Baroque and Classical symphonies in D major typically used horns in D (reading a seventh down) and when they used trumpets, trumpets in D reading a step up. The following list includes only the most famous of the Classical and Romantic periods.

- Ludwig van Beethoven
  - Symphony No. 2, Op. 36 (1802)
- Johannes Brahms
  - Symphony No. 2, Op. 73 (1877)
- Joseph Haydn
  - Symphony No. 6 "Le Matin" (1761)
  - Symphony No. 13 (1763)
  - Symphony No. 70 (1779)
  - Symphony No. 86 (1786)
  - Symphony No. 93 (1791)
  - Symphony No. 96 "Miracle" (1791)
  - Symphony No. 101 "Clock" (1794)
  - Symphony No. 104 "London" (1795)
- Antonín Dvořák
  - Symphony No. 6, Op. 60, B. 112 (1880)
- Gustav Mahler
  - Symphony No. 1 (1888)
  - Symphony No. 9 (1909)
- Wolfgang Amadeus Mozart
  - Symphony No. 4, KV 19 (1765)
  - Symphony No. 7, KV 45 (1768)
  - Symphony No. 8, KV 48 (1768)
  - Symphony No. 11, KV 84 (1770)
  - Symphony No. 20, KV 133 (1772)
  - Symphony No. 23, KV 181 (1773)
  - Symphony No. 30, KV 202 (1774)
  - Symphony No. 31 "Paris", KV 297 (1778)
  - Symphony No. 35 "Haffner", KV 385 (1782)
  - Symphony No. 38 "Prague", KV 504 (1786)
- Franz Schubert
  - Symphony No. 1, D 82
  - Symphony No. 3, D 200
  - Symphony No. 10, D 936A (unfinished)
- Jean Sibelius
  - Symphony No. 2, Op. 43 (1902)
- Sergei Prokofiev
  - Symphony No. 1 "Classical", Op. 25 (1917)
- Johann Stamitz
  - Symphony in D major, Op. 3, No. 2
- Pyotr Ilyich Tchaikovsky
  - Symphony No. 3 "Polish", Op. 29 (1875)
- Ralph Vaughan Williams
  - Symphony No. 5 - nominally in the key
- Alexander Glazunov
  - Symphony No. 3, Op. 33

== D minor ==
Baroque and Classical symphonies in D minor usually used 2 horns in F (whereas for most other minor keys 2 or 4 horns were used, half in the tonic and half in the relative major). Michael Haydn's Symphony No. 29 in D minor is notable for using two trumpets in D (the horns are in F but change to D for the coda of the finale). In the Romantic era, D minor symphonies, like symphonies in almost any other key, used horns in F and trumpets in B♭.

- Ludwig van Beethoven
  - Symphony No. 9 "Choral", Op. 125 (1824)
- Havergal Brian
  - Symphony No. 1 "Gothic" (1927)
- Robert Schumann
  - Symphony No. 4, Op. 120 (1841)
- Anton Bruckner
  - Symphony No. 0 (1869)
  - Symphony No. 3 (1873, 1877, 1891)
  - Symphony No. 9 (1896, unfinished)
- Antonín Dvořák
  - Symphony No. 4, Op. 13, B. 41 (1874)
  - Symphony No. 7, Op. 70, B. 141 (1885)
- César Franck
  - Symphony in D minor
- Alexander Glazunov
  - Symphony No. 9 (1910, unfinished)
- Joseph Haydn
  - Symphony No. 26 "Lamentatione" (1768)
  - Symphony No. 80 (1784)
- Michael Haydn
  - Symphony No. 29 (1784)
- Gustav Mahler
  - Symphony No. 3 (1896)
- Sergei Rachmaninoff
  - Symphony No. 1, Op. 13 (1895)
- Felix Mendelssohn
  - Symphony No. 5 "Reformation", Op. 107 (1830)
- Martin Scherber
  - Symphony No. 1 (1938)
- Dmitri Shostakovich
  - Symphony No. 5, Op. 47 (1937)
  - Symphony No. 12, Op. 112 (1961)
- Jean Sibelius
  - Symphony No. 6, Op. 104 (1923)
- Richard Strauss
  - Symphony No. 1 (1880)
- Ralph Vaughan Williams
  - Symphony No. 8 (1955)

== E♭ major ==
- Elfrida Andrée
  - Symphony No. 2
- Ludwig van Beethoven
  - Symphony No. 3 "Eroica", Op. 55 (1804)
- Alexander Borodin
  - Symphony No. 1 (before 1869)
- Anton Bruckner
  - Symphony No. 4 "Romantic" (1874)
- Antonín Dvořák
  - Symphony No. 3 (1873)
- Edward Elgar
  - Symphony No. 2, Op. 63 (1911)
- Alexander Glazunov
  - Symphony No. 4, Op. 48
  - Symphony No. 8, Op. 83
- Karl Goldmark
  - Rustic Wedding Symphony, Op. 26 (1875)
- Joseph Haydn
  - Symphony No. 22 "The Philosopher" (1764)
  - Symphony No. 99 (1793)
  - Symphony No. 103 "Drumroll" (1795)
- Robert Schumann
  - Symphony No. 3 "Rhenish", Op. 97 (1850)
- Jean Sibelius
  - Symphony No. 5, Op. 82 (1915)
- Gustav Mahler
  - Symphony No. 8 "Symphony of a Thousand" (1907)
- Wolfgang Amadeus Mozart
  - Symphony No. 1, KV 16 (1764)
  - Symphony No. 3, KV 18 (1765)
  - Symphony No. 19, KV 132 (1772)
  - Symphony No. 39, KV 543 (1788)
- Dmitri Shostakovich
  - Symphony No. 3 "The First of May", Op. 20 (1931)
  - Symphony No. 9, Op. 70 (1945)
- Johann Stamitz
  - Symphony in E♭ major, Op. 11, No. 3

== E♭ minor ==
The two examples of symphonies in E♭ minor that come up most readily are both Sixth Symphonies by Soviet composers.

- Nikolai Myaskovsky
  - Symphony No. 6, Op. 23 (1921-3)
- Sergei Prokofiev
  - Symphony No. 6, Op. 111 (1947)

== E major ==
In the classical period, symphonies in E major used horns in E but no trumpets.

- Joseph Haydn
  - Symphony No. 12 (1763)
  - Symphony No. 29 (1765)
- Max Bruch
  - Symphony No. 3
- Joachim Raff
  - Symphony No. 5 "Lenore", Op.177 (1872)
- Anton Bruckner
  - Symphony No. 7 (1883)
- Alexander Scriabin
  - Symphony No. 1, Op. 26 (1900)
- Franz Schubert
  - Symphony No. 7, D 729
- Alexander Glazunov
  - Symphony No. 1, Op. 5

== E minor ==
- Amy Beach
  - Gaelic Symphony, Op. 32 (1894)
- Johannes Brahms
  - Symphony No. 4, Op. 98 (1885)
- Antonín Dvořák
  - Symphony No. 9 "From the New World", Op. 95, B. 178 (1893)
- Joseph Haydn
  - Symphony No. 44 "Trauer" (1770)
- Pyotr Ilyich Tchaikovsky
  - Symphony No. 5, Op. 64 (1888)
- Jean Sibelius
  - Symphony No. 1, Op. 39 (1898)
- Gustav Mahler
  - Symphony No. 7 (1906)
- Sergei Rachmaninoff
  - Symphony No. 2, Op. 27 (1907)
- Dmitri Shostakovich
  - Symphony No. 10, Op. 93 (1948)
- Ralph Vaughan Williams
  - Symphony No. 6 (1948)
  - Symphony No. 9 (1957)

== F major ==
- Joseph Haydn
  - Symphony No. 79 (1784)
  - Symphony No. 89 (1787)
- Ludwig van Beethoven
  - Symphony No. 6 "Pastoral", Op. 68 (1808)
  - Symphony No. 8, Op. 93 (1812)
- Alexander Glazunov
  - Symphony No. 7 "Pastoral", Op. 77
- Joachim Raff
  - Symphony No. 3 "Im Walde", Op. 153 (1870)
- Antonín Dvořák
  - Symphony No. 5, Op. 76, B. 54 (1875)
- Johannes Brahms
  - Symphony No. 3, Op. 90 (1883)
- Zdeněk Fibich
  - Symphony No. 1, Op. 17 (1883)
- Nikolai Myaskovsky
  - Symphony No. 16 "Aviation", Op. 39 (1935-1936)

== F minor ==
Even in the Sturm und Drang era, F minor was not a frequent choice for a minor key symphony, though Haydn did contribute one.

- Anton Bruckner
  - Study Symphony in F minor
- Joseph Haydn
  - Symphony No. 49 "La Passione" (1768)
- Richard Strauss
  - Symphony No. 2, Op. 12 (1884)
- Pyotr Ilyich Tchaikovsky
  - Symphony No. 4, Op. 36 (1878)
- Sir Charles Villiers Stanford
  - Symphony No. 3 "The Irish", Op. 28 (1887)
- Dmitri Shostakovich
  - Symphony No. 1, Op. 10 (1925)
- Richard Strauss
  - Symphony No. 2, Op. 12 (1885)
- Ralph Vaughan Williams
  - Symphony No. 4 (1934)
- Martin Scherber
  - Symphony No. 2 (1951–52)

== F♯ major ==
The only notable (completed) symphony written explicitly in F♯ major is Erich Wolfgang Korngold's Symphony in F♯ major, Op. 40 of 1950.

Gustav Mahler's unfinished Tenth Symphony is in this key. So is Olivier Messiaen's Turangalîla-Symphonie, as several of its movements including the finale are in that key, although it could be excluded on the grounds that it is very far from traditionally tonal.

== F♯ minor ==
Though it has just three sharps and its relative major was used somewhat frequently, F♯ minor was an unusual choice of key in the Classical era.

- George Frederick Bristow
  - Symphony in F♯ minor, Op. 26
- Alexander Glazunov
  - Symphony No. 2, Op. 16
- Joseph Haydn
  - Symphony No. 45 "Farewell" (1772)
- Nikolai Myaskovsky
  - Symphony No. 21, Op. 51 (1940)
- Dora Pejačević
  - Symphony (1917)

== G major ==
In the Baroque and Classical periods, G major was one of the most often used keys. Classical symphonies in G major typically had horns in G, but no trumpets. In the Romantic era, the key was less often used. The following list only includes the most famous works.

- Antonín Dvořák
  - Symphony No. 8, Op. 88, B. 163 (1889)
- George Dyson
  - Symphony in G major (1937)
- Joseph Haydn
  - Symphony No. 8 "Le Soir" (1761)
  - Symphony No. 88 (late 1780s)
  - Symphony No. 92 "Oxford" (1791)
  - Symphony No. 94 "Surprise" (1791)
  - Symphony No. 100 "Military" (1794)
- Wolfgang Amadeus Mozart
  - Symphony No. 10, KV 74 (1770)
  - Symphony No. 12, KV 110 (1771)
  - Symphony No. 15, KV 124 (1772)
  - Symphony No. 17, KV 129 (1772)
  - Symphony No. 27, KV 199 (1773)
  - Symphony No. 32, KV 318 (1779)
- Gustav Mahler
  - Symphony No. 4 (1901)
- Johann Stamitz
  - Symphony in G major "Mannheim No. 1"
- Ralph Vaughan Williams
  - Symphony No. 2 "A London Symphony" (1914)

== G minor ==
G minor was a frequent choice for minor key symphonies. In the Classical period, symphonies in G minor almost always used four horns, two in G and two in B♭ alto.

- Joseph Haydn
  - Symphony No. 39 (1767)
  - Symphony No. 83, The Hen (1785)
- Wolfgang Amadeus Mozart
  - Symphony No. 25, KV 183 (1773)
  - Symphony No. 40, KV 550 (1788)
- Pyotr Ilyich Tchaikovsky
  - Symphony No. 1 "Winter Daydreams" (1866)
- Carl Nielsen
  - Symphony No. 1 (1891)
- Dmitri Shostakovich
  - Symphony No. 11 "The Year 1905", Op. 103 (1957)

== A♭ major ==
Although A♭ major was chosen often enough for inner movements of symphonies in other keys (most notably slow movements of C minor symphonies), there are very few symphonies with A♭ major as their main key.

- Edward Elgar
  - Symphony No. 1, Op. 55 (1908)
- Jef van Hoof
  - Symphony No. 2 (1941)
- Johann Baptist Wanhal
  - Symphony in A♭ major, Bryan Ab1

== G♯ minor ==
- Nikolai Myaskovsky
  - Symphony No. 17
- Elliot Goldenthal
  - Symphony in G♯ minor

== A major ==
The following list only includes the most famous A major symphonies.

- Ludwig van Beethoven
  - Symphony No. 7, Op. 92 (1812)
- Anton Bruckner
  - Symphony No. 6 (1881)
- Joseph Haydn
  - Symphony No. 59, "Fire" (before 1769)
  - Symphony No. 64, "Tempora mutantur" (1778)
  - Symphony No. 87 (1785/6)
- Felix Mendelssohn
  - Symphony No. 4 "Italian", Op. 90 (1833)
- Wolfgang Amadeus Mozart
  - Symphony No. 14, KV 114 (1771)
  - Symphony No. 21, KV 134 (1772)
  - Symphony No. 29, KV 201 (1774)
- Dmitri Shostakovich
  - Symphony No. 15, Op. 141 (1971)
- Johann Stamitz
  - Symphony in A major "Mannheim No. 2"
- Richard Wetz
  - Symphony No. 2, Op. 47 (1921)

== A minor ==
- Alexander Borodin
  - Symphony No. 3 (1886–1887, unfinished)
- Felix Mendelssohn
  - Symphony No. 3 "Scottish", Op. 56 (1842)
- Gustav Mahler
  - Symphony No. 6 "Tragic" (1904)
- Jean Sibelius
  - Symphony No. 4, Op. 63 (1911)
- Sergei Rachmaninoff
  - Symphony No. 3, Op. 44 (1936)
- Stephen Brown
  - Symphony, The Northern Journey (1986–89, revision 1992)

== B♭ major ==
Haydn's Symphony No. 98 is credited as the first symphony written in B♭ major in which trumpet and timpani parts are included. Actually, his brother Michael Haydn had written one such symphony earlier, No. 36. However, Joseph still gets credit for writing the timpani part at actual pitch with an F major key signature (instead of transposing with a C major key signature), a procedure that made sense since he limited that instrument to the tonic and dominant pitches. Many editions of the work, however, use no key signature and specify the instrument as "Timpani in B♭ - F." (Note that in German, the pitch B♭ is called "B", and B natural is "H", thus the specification for timpani in a B♭ work could be written "Pauken in B. - F.")

- Ludwig van Beethoven
  - Symphony No. 4, Op. 60 (1806)
- Anton Bruckner
  - Symphony No. 5 (1876)
- Ernest Chausson
  - Symphony in B♭, Op. 20 (1890)
- Antonín Dvořák
  - Symphony No. 2 (1865)
- Alexander Glazunov
  - Symphony No. 5, Op. 48
- Joseph Haydn
  - Symphony No. 85 "La Reine" (1785/6)
  - Symphony No. 98 (1792)
  - Symphony No. 102 (1794/5)
- Andrea Luchesi
  - Symphony in B♭ major (ca.1770)
- Wolfgang Amadeus Mozart
  - Symphony No. 24, KV 182 (1773)
  - Symphony No. 33, KV 319 (1779)
- Franz Schubert
  - Symphony No. 2, D 125 (1815)
  - Symphony No. 5, D 485 (1816)
- Robert Schumann
  - Symphony No. 1 "Spring", Op. 38 (1841)
- Sergei Prokofiev
  - Symphony No. 5, Op. 100 (1944)
- Johann Stamitz
  - Symphony in B♭ major "Mannheim No. 3"

== B♭ minor ==
B♭ minor occurs often enough in the piano repertoire, much less so in the orchestral repertoire. Even allowing little-known works, the list is rather short.

- Havergal Brian
  - Symphony No. 8 (1949)
- Frederic Hymen Cowen
  - Symphony No. 4
- Jānis Ivanovs
  - Symphony No. 1 (1933)
- Dmitry Kabalevsky
  - Symphony No. 3, Op. 22 (1933)
- Miloslav Kabeláč
  - Symphony No. 5 Dramatic, Op. 41 (1960)
- Tikhon Khrennikov
  - Symphony No. 1, Op. 4 (1933-5)
- Sergei Lyapunov
  - Symphony No. 2, Op. 66
- Albéric Magnard
  - Symphony No. 3, Op. 11 (1896)
- Nikolai Myaskovsky
  - Symphony No. 11, Op. 34 (1932)
  - Symphony No. 13, Op. 36 (1933)
- Harald Sæverud
  - Symphony No. 3, Op. 5
- Dmitri Shostakovich
  - Symphony No. 13 "Babi Yar", Op. 113 (1962)
- Maximilian Steinberg
  - Symphony No. 2, Op. 8 (1909) In Memoriam Rimsky-Korsakov
- Richard Wetz
  - Symphony No. 3, Op.48 (1922)
- William Walton
  - Symphony No. 1 (1932–35)

== B major ==
Haydn's use of B major in his Symphony No. 46 was deemed "extraordinary" for a symphony in the 18th century.

- Joseph Haydn
  - Symphony No. 46 (1772)
- Erich Wolfgang Korngold
  - Sinfonietta, Op. 5 (1912)
- Georg Matthias Monn
  - Sinfonia (1740s)
- Dmitri Shostakovich
  - Symphony No. 2 "To October", Op. 14 (1927)

== B minor ==
B minor is the key of some famous symphonies in the repertoire, as well as a few lesser known ones.

- Alexander Borodin
  - Symphony No. 2 (1876)
- Wilhelm Furtwängler
  - Symphony No. 1 (1941)
- Ignacy Jan Paderewski
  - Symphony in B minor (Polonia), Op. 24 (1908)
- Martin Scherber
  - Symphony No. 3 (Die Russische) (1952–55)
- Franz Schubert
  - Symphony No. 8 (Unfinished), D. 759 (1822, inc.)
- Dmitri Shostakovich
  - Symphony No. 6, Op. 54 (1939)
- Pyotr Ilyich Tchaikovsky
  - Manfred Symphony, Op. 58 (1885)
  - Symphony No. 6 (Pathétique), Op. 74 (1893)
- Reinhold Glière
  - Symphony No. 3 "Ilya Muromets", Op. 42 (1911)
