= List of compositions by Alexander Glazunov =

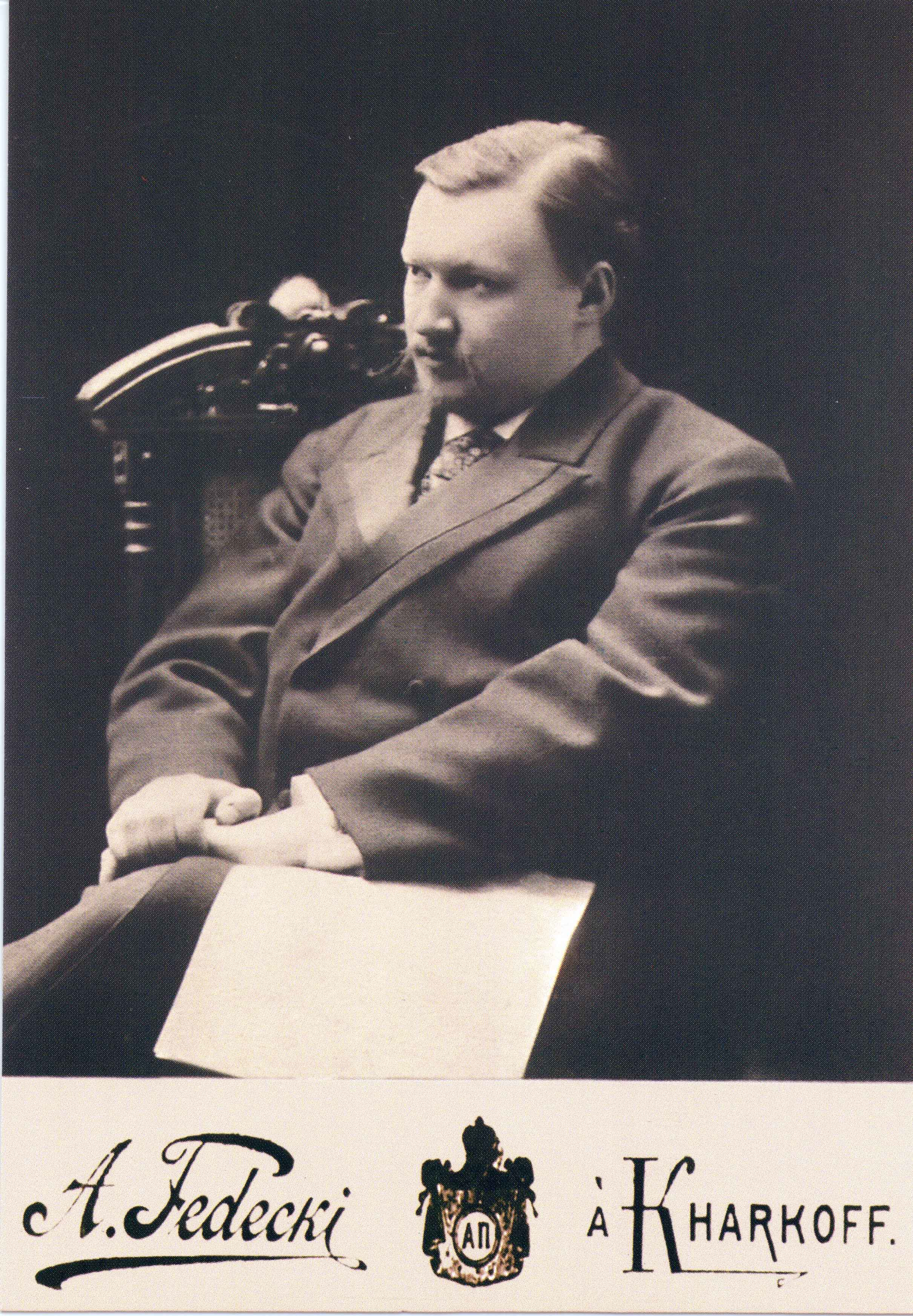
Alexander Glazunov, 1899

This is a list of compositions by Alexander Glazunov (1865–1936).

== By genre ==
=== Stage ===
Op. 57: Raymonda, ballet in three acts (1898)
Op. 61: Les Ruses d'Amour (The Ruses of Love), also known as The Trial of Damis or Lady Soubrette, ballet in one act (1900)
Op. 67: The Seasons, ballet in one act (1900)
Op. 95: Music for the drama The King of the Jews after K. K. Romanov (1913)
Incidental music for Lermontov’s play Masquerade (1912–13)

=== Orchestral ===
Symphonies

Op. 5: Symphony No. 1 in E major "Slavonian Symphony" (1881–1884)
Op. 16: Symphony No. 2 in F♯ minor "To the Memory of Liszt" (1886)
Op. 33: Symphony No. 3 in D major (1890)
Op. 48: Symphony No. 4 in E♭ major (1893)
Op. 55: Symphony No. 5 in B♭ major (1895)
Op. 58: Symphony No. 6 in C minor (1896)
Op. 77: Symphony No. 7 in F major "Pastorale" (1902–1903)
Op. 83: Symphony No. 8 in E♭ major (1905–1906)
Symphony No. 9 in D minor (1910), first movement (incomplete; orchestrated by Gavril Yudin)

Op. 3: Overture No. 1 in G minor for orchestra "On Greek Themes" (1882)
Op. 6: Overture No. 2 in D major for orchestra (1883)
Op. 7: Serenade No. 1 in A major for orchestra (1882)
Op. 8: To the Memory of a Hero, elegy for orchestra (1885)
Op. 9: Suite Charactéristique in D major for orchestra (1884–1887)
Op. 11: Serenade No. 2 in F major for small orchestra (1884)
Op. 12: Poème Lyrique in D♭ major for orchestra (1884–1887)
Op. 13: Stenka Razin, symphonic poem in B minor (1885)
Op. 14: Two Pieces for orchestra (1886–1887)
Op. 18: Mazurka in G major for orchestra (1888)
Op. 19: The Forest, fantasy in C♯ minor for orchestra (1887)
Op. 21: Wedding March in E♭ major for orchestra (1889)
Op. 26A: Slavonian Feast, symphonic sketches (1888)
Op. 28: The Sea, fantasy in E major for orchestra (1889)
Op. 29: Oriental Rhapsody in G major for orchestra (1889)
Op. 30: The Kremlin, symphonic picture in three parts (1890)
Op. 34: The Spring, symphonic picture in D major (1891)
Op. 45: Carnaval, overture for large orchestra and organ in F major (1892)
Op. 46: Chopiniana, suite for orchestra after piano pieces by Chopin (1893)
Op. 47: Concert Waltz No. 1 in D major for orchestra (1893)
Op. 50: Cortège Solennel in D major for orchestra (1894)
Op. 51: Concert Waltz No. 2 in F major for orchestra (1894)
Op. 52: Scènes de Ballet, suite, not intended as dance piece (1894)
Op. 53: Fantasy From Dark into Light for orchestra (1894)
Op. 68: "Pas de Caractère" from Raymonda in G major for orchestra (1899)
Op. 69: Intermezzo Romantica in D major for orchestra (1900)
Op. 73: Solemn Overture for orchestra (1900)
Op. 76: March on a Russian Theme in E♭ major (1901)
Op. 78: Ballade in F major for orchestra (1902)
Op. 79: From the Middle Ages, suite in E major for orchestra (1902)
Op. 81: Dance-Scene in A major for orchestra (1904)
Op. 84: The Song of Destiny, dramatic overture in D minor for orchestra (1908)
Op. 85: Two Preludes for orchestra (1908)
Op. 86: Russian Fantasy in A major for balalaika-orchestra (1906)
Op. 87: To the Memory of Gogol, symphonic prologue in C major (1909)
Op. 88: Finnish Fantasy in C major for orchestra (1909)
Op. 89: Finnish Sketches in E major for orchestra (1912)
Op. 90: Introduction and Dance of Salomé, to the drama of Oscar Wilde (1908)
Op. 91: "Cortège Solennel" in B♭ major for orchestra (1910)
Op. 96: Paraphrase on the Hymn of the Allies for orchestra (1914–1915)
Op. 99: Karelian Legend in A minor for orchestra (1916)
Op. 102: Romance of Nina from the play "Masquerada" (1918)
Poème épique in A minor for orchestra (1933–34)

=== Concertante ===
Op. 20: Two Pieces for cello and orchestra (1887–1888)
Op. 32: Méditation in D major for violin and orchestra or piano (1891)
Op. 82: Concerto in A minor for violin and orchestra (1904)
Op. 92: Concerto No. 1 in F minor for piano and orchestra (1910–1911)
Op. 100: Concerto No. 2 in B major for piano and orchestra (1917)
Op. 100A/B: Mazurka Oberek for violin and orchestra or piano (1917)
Op. 108: Concert Ballade in C major for cello and orchestra (1931)
Op. 109: Concerto for Alto Saxophone and String Orchestra in E♭ major (1934) (same opus number as Saxophone Quartet, but different work

In 1896 he arranged Tchaikovsky's violin and piano piece Souvenir d'un lieu cher for violin and orchestra.

=== Choral with orchestra ===
Op. 40: Triumph March for large orchestra and chorus (1892)
Op. 56: Coronation Cantata for four soloists, chorus and orchestra (1895)
Op. 65: Commemorative Cantata for the Centenary of the Birth of Pushkin for solo voices, chorus and orchestra (1899)
Op. 97: Song of the Volga-skippers for chorus and orchestra (1918)

=== Chamber ===
String Quartets

Op. 1: String Quartet No. 1 in D major (1881–1882)
Op. 10: String Quartet No. 2 in F major (1884)
Op. 26: String Quartet No. 3 in G major "Quatuor Slave" (1886–1888)
Op. 64: String Quartet No. 4 in A minor (1894)
Op. 70: String Quartet No. 5 in D minor (1898)
Op. 106: String Quartet No. 6 in B♭ major (1920–1921)
Op. 107: String Quartet No. 7 in C major "Hommage au passé" (1930)

Op. 14: Oriental Reverie for clarinet and string quartet (original version of 2 Pieces for Orchestra) (1886)
Op. 15: Five Novelettes for String Quartet (1886)
Op. 35: Suite in C major for string quartet (1887–1891)
Op. 38: In Modo Religioso, quartet for trumpet, horn and two trombones (1892)
Op. 39: String Quintet in A major for string quartet and cello (1891–1892)
Op. 105: Elegy in D minor for string quartet in memory of M. P. Belaieff (1928)
Op. 109: Saxophone Quartet in B♭ major (1932)

=== Instrumental ===
Op. 17: Elegy in D♭ major for cello and piano (1888)
Op. 24: Rêverie in D♭ major for horn and piano (1890)
Op. 32A: Meditation in D major for violin and piano (1891)
Op. 44: Elegy in G minor for viola and piano (1893)
Op. 71: Chant du Ménestrel for cello and piano (1900) (a version exists for cello and orchestra)
Op. 93: Preludium and Fugue No. 1 in D major for organ (1906–1907)
Op. 98: Preludium and Fugue No. 2 in D minor for organ (1914)
Op. 110: Fantasy in G minor for organ (1934–1935)
Albumblatt for trumpet and piano (1899)
10 Duets for Two Clarinets

=== Piano ===
Op. 2: Suite on the Theme "S–A–C–H–A" for Piano (1883)
Op. 22: Two Pieces for Piano (1889)
Op. 23: Waltzes on the name S–A–B–E–L–A for piano (1890)
Op. 25: Preludium and Two Mazurkas for piano (1888)
Op. 31: Three Études for piano (1891)
Op. 36: Small Waltz in D major for piano (1892)
Op. 37: Nocturne in D♭ major for piano (1889)
Op. 41: Grand Concert Waltz in E♭ major for piano (1893)
Op. 42: Three Miniatures for piano (1893)
Op. 43: Salon Waltz in C major for piano (1893)
Op. 49: Three Pieces for piano (1894)
Op. 54: Two Impromptus for piano (1895)
Op. 62: Prelude and Fugue in D minor, for piano (1899)
Op. 72: Theme and Variations in F♯ minor for piano (1900)
Op. 74: Piano Sonata No. 1 in B♭ minor (1901)
Op. 75: Piano Sonata No. 2 in E minor (1901)
Op. 101: Four Preludes and Fugues for piano (1918–1923)
Op. 103: Idylle in F♯ major for piano (1926)
Op. 104: Fantasy in F minor for two pianos (1919–1920)

arr. of Liszt Sposalizio, S161/1 for 2 pianos (date?) [on IMSLP]

=== Vocal/Choral ===
Op. 4: Five Romances, songs (1882–1885)
Op. 27: Two Songs after Pushkin (1887–1890)
Op. 59: Six Songs for middle voice (1898)
Op. 60: Six songs (romances to poetry of Alexander Pushkin and Apollon Maykov) for high voice (1897–1898)
Op. 63: Festive Cantata for solo-voices, women's chorus and two pianos eight hands (1898)
Op. 65: Commemorative Cantata for the Centenary of the Birth of Pushkin for mezzo-soprano, tenor, mixed choir and piano (1899)
Op. 80: Chant Sans Bornes for soprano and alto with piano accompaniment (1900)
Op. 94: Love after Shukovsky for mixed chorus a cappella (1907)

== By opus number ==
Op. 1: String Quartet No. 1 in D major (1881–1882)
Op. 2: Suite on the Theme "S–A–C–H–A" for Piano (1883)
Op. 3: Overture No. 1 in G minor for orchestra "On Greek Themes" (1882)
Op. 4: Five Romances, songs (1882–1885)
Op. 5: Symphony No. 1 in E major "Slavonian Symphony" (1881–1884)
Op. 6: Overture No. 2 in D major for orchestra (1883)
Op. 7: Serenade No. 1 in A major for orchestra (1882)
Op. 8: To the Memory of a Hero, elegy for orchestra (1885)
Op. 9: Suite Charactéristique in D major for orchestra (1884–1887)
Op. 10: String Quartet No. 2 in F major (1884)
Op. 11: Serenade No. 2 in F major for small orchestra (1884)
Op. 12: Poème Lyrique in D♭ major for orchestra (1884–1887)
Op. 13: Stenka Razin, symphonic poem in B minor (1885)
Op. 14: Two Pieces for orchestra (1886–1887)
Op. 15: Five Novelettes for String Quartet (1886)
Op. 16: Symphony No. 2 in F♯ minor "To the Memory of Liszt" (1886)
Op. 17: Elegy in D♭ major for cello and piano (1888)
Op. 18: Mazurka in G major for orchestra (1888)
Op. 19: The Forest, Fantasy in C♯ minor for orchestra (1887)
Op. 20: Two Pieces for cello and orchestra (1887–1888)
Op. 21: Wedding March in E♭ major for orchestra (1889)
Op. 22: Two Pieces for Piano (1889)
Op. 23: Waltzes on the name S–A–B–E–L–A for piano (1890)
Op. 24: Rêverie in D♭ major for horn and piano (1890)
Op. 25: Preludium and Two Mazurkas for piano (1888)
Op. 26: String Quartet No. 3 in G major "Quatuor Slave" (1886–1888)
Op. 26A: Slavonian Feast, symphonic sketches (1888)
Op. 27: Two Songs after Pushkin (1887–1890)
Op. 28: The Sea, fantasy in E major for orchestra (1889)
Op. 29: Oriental Rhapsody in G major for orchestra (1889)
Op. 30: The Kremlin, symphonic picture in three parts (1890)
Op. 31: Three Études for piano (1891)
Op. 32: Meditation in D major for violin and orchestra (1891)
Op. 32A: Meditation in D major for violin and piano (1891)
Op. 33: Symphony No. 3 in D major (1890)
Op. 34: The Spring, symphonic picture in D major (1891)
Op. 35: Suite in C major for string quartet (1887–1891)
Op. 36: Small Waltz in D major for piano (1892)
Op. 37: Nocturne in D♭ major for piano (1889)
Op. 38: In Modo Religioso, quartet for trumpet, horn and two trombones (1892)
Op. 39: String Quintet in A major for string quartet and cello (1891–1892)
Op. 40: Triumph March for large orchestra and chorus (1892)
Op. 41: Large Concert Waltz in E♭ major for piano (1893)
Op. 42: Three Miniatures for piano (1893)
Op. 43: Salon Waltz in C major for piano (1893)
Op. 44: Elegy for viola and piano (1893)
Op. 45: Carnaval, overture for large orchestra and organ in F major (1892)
Op. 46: Chopiniana, suite for orchestra after piano pieces by Chopin (1893)
Op. 47: Concert Waltz No. 1 in D major for orchestra (1893)
Op. 48: Symphony No. 4 in E♭ major (1893)
Op. 49: Three Pieces for piano (1894)
Op. 50: Cortège Solennel in D major for orchestra (1894)
Op. 51: Concert Waltz No. 2 in F major for orchestra (1894)
Op. 52: Scènes de Ballet, suite, not intended as dance piece (1894)
Op. 53: Fantasy From Dark into Light for orchestra (1894)
Op. 54: Two Impromptus for piano (1895)
Op. 55: Symphony No. 5 in B♭ major (1895)
Op. 56: Coronation Cantata for four soloists, chorus and orchestra (1895)
Op. 57: Raymonda, ballet in three acts (1898)
Op. 58: Symphony No. 6 in C minor (1896)
Op. 59: Six Songs for middle voice (1898)
Op. 60: Six songs (romances to poetry of Alexander Pushkin and Apollon Maykov) for high voice (1897–1898)
Op. 61: Les Ruses d'Amour (The Ruses of Love), also known as The Trial of Damis or Lady Soubrette, ballet in one act (1900)
Op. 62: Prelude and Fugue in D minor, for piano (1899)
Op. 63: Festive Cantata for solo-voices, women's chorus and two pianos eight hands (1898)
Op. 64: String Quartet No. 4 in A minor (1894)
Op. 65: Commemorative Cantata for the Centenary of the Birth of Pushkin for solo voices, chorus and orchestra (1899)
Op. 66: Hymn after Pushkin for women's chorus and piano (1899)
Op. 67: The Seasons, ballet in one act (1900)
Op. 68: "Pas de Caractère" from Raymonda in G major for orchestra (1899)
Op. 69: Intermezzo Romantica in D major for orchestra (1900)
Op. 70: String Quartet No. 5 in D minor (1898)
Op. 71: Chant du Ménestrel for cello and piano (1900) (a version exists for cello and orchestra)
Op. 72: Theme and Variations in F♯ minor for piano (1900)
Op. 73: Solemn Overture for orchestra (1900)
Op. 74: Piano Sonata No. 1 in B♭ minor (1901)
Op. 75: Piano Sonata No. 2 in E minor (1901)
Op. 76: March on a Russian Theme in E♭ major (1901)
Op. 77: Symphony No. 7 "Pastorale" in F major (1902–1903)
Op. 78: Ballade in F major for orchestra (1902)
Op. 79: From the Middle Ages, suite in E major for orchestra (1902)
Op. 80: Chant Sans Bornes for soprano and alto with piano accompaniment (1900)
Op. 81: Dance-Scene in A major for orchestra (1904)
Op. 82: Concerto in A minor for violin and orchestra (1904)
Op. 83: Symphony No. 8 in E♭ major (1905–1906)
Op. 84: The Song of Destiny, dramatic overture in D minor for orchestra (1908)
Op. 85: Two Preludes for orchestra (1906)
Op. 86: Russian Fantasy in A major for balalaika-orchestra (1906)
Op. 87: To the Memory of Gogol, symphonic prologue in C major (1909)
Op. 88: Finnish Fantasy in C major for orchestra (1909)
Op. 89: Finnish Sketches in E major for orchestra (1912)
Op. 90: Introduction and Dance of Salomé, to the drama of Oscar Wilde (1908)
Op. 91: Cortège Solennel in B♭ major for orchestra (1910)
Op. 92: Concerto No. 1 in F minor for piano and orchestra (1910–1911)
Op. 93: Preludium and Fugue No. 1 in D major for organ (1906–1907)
Op. 94: Love after Shukovsky for mixed chorus a cappella (1907)
Op. 95: Music to the drama The King of the Jews after K. K. Romanov (1913)
Op. 96: Paraphrase on the Hymn of the Allies for orchestra (1914–1915)
Op. 97: Song of the Volga-skippers for chorus and orchestra (1918)
Op. 98: Preludium and Fugue No. 2 in D minor for organ (1914)
Op. 99: Karelian Legend in A minor for orchestra (1916)
Op. 100: Concerto No. 2 in B major for piano and orchestra (1917)
Op. 100A/B: Mazurka Oberek (1917) for violin and orchestra or piano (1917)
Op. 101: Four Preludes and Fugues for piano (1918–1923)
Op. 102: Romance of Nina from the play "Masquerada" (1918)
Op. 103: Idylle in F♯ major for piano (1926)
Op. 104: Fantasy in F minor for two pianos (1919–1920)
Op. 105: Elegy in D minor for string quartet in memory of M. P. Belyayev (1928)
Op. 106: String Quartet No. 6 in B♭ major (1920–1921)
Op. 107: String Quartet No. 7 in C major "Hommage au passé" (1930)
Op. 108: Concert Ballade in C major for cello and orchestra (1931)
Op. 109: Saxophone Quartet in B♭ major (1932)
Op. 109: Concerto for Alto Saxophone and String Orchestra in E♭ major (1934) (same opus number as quartet, but different work)
Op. 110: Fantasy in G minor for organ (1934–1935)

- Works without opus number:

Albumblatt for trumpet and piano (1899)
Symphony No. 9 in D minor (1910) – first movement (incomplete)
Reverie Orientale for Clarinet and String Quartet (1886)
10 Duets for Two Clarinets
Poème épique in A minor for orchestra (1933–34)
Incidental music for Lermontov’s play Masquerade (1912–13)
Prelude and Fugue in E minor for piano [Published by Muzgiz]
