= Symphony in E =

Symphony in E can refer to:

- List of symphonies in E minor
- List of symphonies in E major

== See also ==
- List of symphonies by key
