= List of symphonies in E major =

This is a list of symphonies in E major written by notable composers.

| Composer | Symphony |
|---|---|
| Carl Friedrich Abel | Symphony in E major, Op. 10 No. 1, E19 (1773) |
| Hugo Alfvén | Symphony No. 3, Op. 23 (1905 Summer) |
| Frederic Austin | Symphony (premiered 1913) |
| Carl Philipp Emanuel Bach | Symphony in E major, Wq.182:6 / H662 (1773) |
| Johann Christian Bach | Symphony No. 28 Op. 18 no. 5 (CW C28, T270/10), 1772. |
| Johann Christoph Friedrich Bach | Symphony in E major, BR-JCFB C 7 / Wf I:4 (ca. 1768) |
| Franz Ignaz Beck | Sinfonia, Op. 13 no. 1 (Callen 25) |
| Hermann Bischoff | Symphony No.1 (ca.1906) |
| Max Bruch | Symphony No. 3, Op. 51 (1882, revised 1884–86) |
| Anton Bruckner | Symphony No. 7 (1881–83, revised 1885) (WAB 107) |
| Christian Cannabich | Symphony No. 52 (published 1772) |
| Frederic Hymen Cowen | Symphony No. 6 "Idyllic" (1897) |
| Eric DeLamarter | Symphony No. 3 (premiered 1933) |
| Carl Ditters von Dittersdorf | Symphony Grave E1 (by 1761); Symphony Grave E2 |
| Ernő Dohnányi | Symphony No. 2, Op. 40 (1945, revised 1954–57) |
| Alban Förster | Symphony (published 1888) |
| Robert Fuchs | Symphony No. 3, Op. 79 (1906) |
| Niels Gade | Symphony No. 2, Op. 10 (1843) |
| Florian Leopold Gassmann | Symphonies Hill 63, 105, 106. One of Wanhal's was attributed to Gassmann once. |
| Alexander Glazunov | Symphony No. 1 "Slavonic", Op. 5 (1881) |
| Alexander Grechaninov | Symphony No. 3, Op. 100 (1920–23) |
| Asger Hamerik | Symphony No. 3, Op. 33 "Symphonie lyrique" (1885) |
| Johan Peter Emilius Hartmann | Symphony No. 2, Op. 48 (1847–48) |
| Joseph Haydn | Symphony No. 12 (1763); Symphony No. 29 (1765) |
| Michael Haydn | Symphony No. 7, MH 65, Perger 5 (1764); Symphony No. 17, MH 151, Perger 17 (1771?) |
| Franz Anton Hoffmeister | Symphony, Op.3 No.1 (1778) |
| Leopold Kozeluch | Symphony P I:E1 |
| Franz Lachner | Symphony No. 4 (1834) |
| Albéric Magnard | Symphony No. 2, Op. 6 (1892–93, rev. 1896) |
| Miguel Marqués | Symphony No. 4 |
| Étienne Méhul | Symphony No. 4 (1810) |
| Erkki Melartin | Symphony No. 4 "Summer", Op. 80 (1912) |
| Nikolai Myaskovsky | Symphony No. 20, 0p. 50 (1940) |
| Ludolf Nielsen | Symphony No. 2, Op. 19 (1907–1909) |
| Carlo d'Ordonez | Symphony, Brown E1; Symphony, Brown E2; Symphony, Brown E3; Symphony, Brown E4 |
| Wenzel Pichl | Symphony Clio, Zakin 8 (1768) |
| Joachim Raff | Symphony No. 5 "Lenore", Op. 177 (1870–1) |
| Levko Revutsky | Symphony No. 2, Op. 12 (1926–27, revised 1940 and 1970) |
| Julius Röntgen | Symphony No. 18 (1932) |
| Guy Ropartz | Symphony No. 3 with choir (1905–1906) |
| Hans Rott | Symphony (1878–80) |
| Franz Schmidt | Symphony No. 1 (1896–99) |
| Arnold Schoenberg | Chamber Symphony No. 1, Op. 9 (1906) |
| Franz Schubert | Symphony No. 7, D. 729 |
| Alexander Scriabin | Symphony No. 1, Op. 26 (1899–1900) |
| Josef Suk | Symphony No. 1, Op. 14 (1897–99) |
| Arthur Sullivan | Symphony "Irish" (1863) (arguably actually in E minor.) |
| Thomas Täglichsbeck | Symphony No. 2, Op. 48 |
| Alexander Tcherepnin | Symphony No. 1, Opus 42 |
| Harold Truscott | Symphony (1949–50) |
| Johann Baptist Wanhal | Symphony, Bryan E1; *Symphony, Bryan E2; Symphony, Bryan E3; Symphony, Bryan E4; Symphony, Bryan E5 |
| Richard Wagner | Symphony in E major (two movements sketched but abandoned in 1834, completed by Felix Mottl in 1887) |
| Karl Weigl | Symphony No. 1, op. 5 (1908) |
| Felix Weingartner | Symphony No. 3, op. 49 with organ (1908–10) |
