= Op. 65 =

In music, Op. 65 stands for Opus number 65. Compositions that are assigned this number include:

- Beethoven – Ah! perfido
- Brahms – Neue Liebeslieder
- Britten – Cello Sonata
- Chopin – Cello Sonata
- Dvořák – Piano Trio No. 3
- Glazunov – Commemorative Cantata for the Centenary of the Birth of Pushkin
- Koechlin – Les Heures persanes
- Mendelssohn – Organ Sonatas, Op. 65
- Prokofiev – Music for Children, Op. 65
- Reger – Zwölf Stücke, Op. 65
- Saint-Saëns – Septet in E♭ major
- Schumann – Ritornelle in canonischen Weisen (7 canonic part songs)
- Shostakovich – Symphony No. 8
- Sibelius – The Bells of Kallio Church (Kallion kirkon kellosävel), transcription for solo piano (1912)
- Strauss – Die Frau ohne Schatten
- Weber – Invitation to the Dance
