= Auf dem Strom =

1828 lied by Franz Schubert

- Lied by Franz Schubert
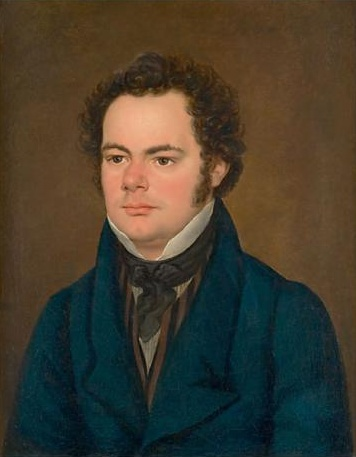
- Schubert
- English: On the River
- Catalogue: D 943
- Opus: 119 (posthumous)
- Text: Poem by Ludwig Rellstab
- Language: German
- Composed: 1828
- Published: 1829
- Scoring: horn, voice, and piano

"Auf dem Strom" (On the River), D 943, Op. posth. 119, is a lied in E major originally written for horn, voice, and piano by Franz Schubert. Set to a poem of the same name by Ludwig Rellstab, the composition was written in March 1828, specifically for a self-organized Vienna concert Schubert would give later that month consisting solely of his own works. The concert took place on 26 March 1828; "Auf dem Strom" was the sole work specifically written for the occasion, and was performed with Schubert at the piano, tenor Ludwig Titze, and hornist Josef Rudolf Lewy. The concert, the only public concert Schubert presented of his own music and the first time Schubert accompanied his lieder in public, was an artistic and financial success, and another performance of "Auf dem Strom" took place on 20 April with Schubert on the piano and Lewy on the horn. The first performance of "Auf dem Strom" after the composer's death substituted the horn part with a cello part played by Joseph Linke; the work would later be published with a cello part included.

== Background ==
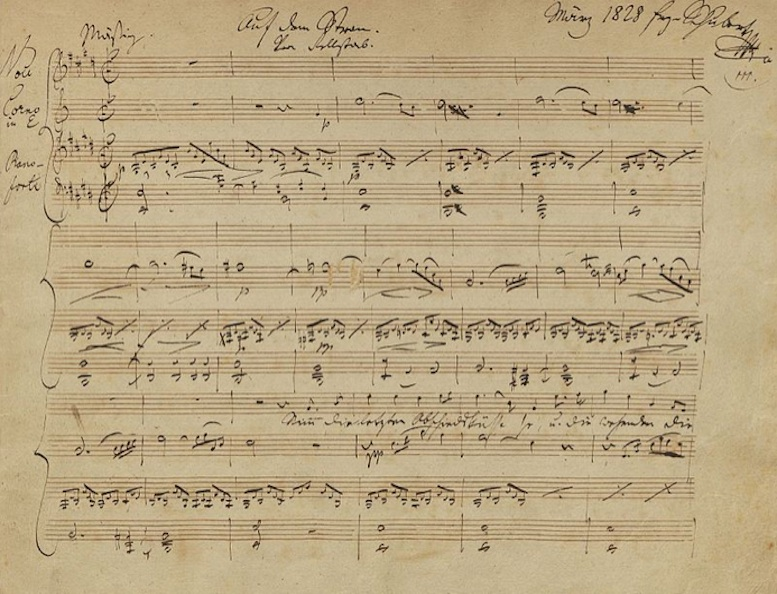
The first page of the autograph of "Auf dem Strom"

In the winter of 1828, the final year of his life, Schubert occupied himself with making plans for a public concert of his own compositions. Were the concert to be successful, there would not only be professional and financial success for the composer, but the benefit of his music becoming known to a wider public. According to musicologist and Schubert biographer Lorraine Byrne Bodley, this would be the most important concert of his life since the premiere of his Mass No. 1 in F major, D 105, for which Schubert served as conductor. The Gesellschaft der Musikfreunde offered Schubert use of the hall, the Musikverein in Tuchlauben, for free. The concert, originally scheduled for 21 March, was rescheduled for 26 March, which was coincidentally the first anniversary of Beethoven's death. Schubert began composing "Auf dem Strom" in March, and the work ended up being the only piece composed specifically for the occasion; Schubert hoped to also complete the cantata Miriams Siegesgesang (D 942) and the Fantasia in F minor for piano four hands (D 940) for the concert but was unable to do so. "Auf dem Strom" was, according to Bodley, an "anniversary lied" and Schubert's "private homage to Beethoven's death and funeral"; Schubert was one of the torchbearers at Beethoven's funeral. According to Graham Johnson, Schubert's choice of the horn for "Auf dem Strom" was partly for commercial reasons, as Josef Rudolf Lewy's name would help sell concert tickets. Johnson says the other reasons, however, were artistic: the sound of the horn symbolized heroism, noble death, and a mournfully elegiac mood, making it fitting as a tribute for Beethoven. "Auf dem Strom" is the first of the two large-scale lieder that Schubert wrote that includes an obbligato solo instrument in addition to voice and piano; the other is "Der Hirt auf dem Felsen" for clarinet, soprano, and piano, D 965, which he wrote a few months later.

"Auf dem Strom" is a setting of a lyric poem by Ludwig Rellstab of the same name. Anton Schindler claims that he first introduced Schubert to the poems of Rellstab after discovering them in Beethoven's posthumous papers; Alfred Einstein, however, believes this to be a myth. According to Einstein, Rellstab was likely brought to Schubert's attention after the poet visited Vienna in 1825 and spoke very critically about the city's musical environment. However, Rellstab, in his own memoirs from 1861, claims that he presented Beethoven with a selection of his lyric poems when he visited Vienna in 1825 and hoped he would set them to music; however, Rellstab then asserts that Beethoven, too ill at the time, gave the poems to Schubert.

At the 26 March concert, "Auf dem Strom" was performed with Schubert playing the piano part, tenor Ludwig Titze singing the vocal part, and Lewy playing the horn part. It was the first time Schubert accompanied any of his compositions in public. The concert was a financial and personal success; the hall was full, and Schubert earned a net amount of 800 florins. Schubert performed the work again with Lewy on 20 April 1828. After Schubert's death, the piece was played on 30 January 1829, at a concert organized to fund a monument to the composer. The horn part was substituted by a cello part, and played by Joseph Linke. "Auf dem Strom" would subsequently be published with an alternative cello part included.

== Poem ==
The poem, written by 1825, consists of five stanzas with eight lines each. The poem alternates its focus throughout; the first and third stanzas nostalgically reflect on the narrator's beloved and the land left behind, while the second and the fourth stanzas look toward the future, albeit bleakly. In the fifth and final stanza, the narrator looks not backward toward the land, but up to the stars in hopes of seeing his beloved there. In the lied, Schubert changes a preposition in the sixth line of the fourth stanza: "Kann kein Lied vom Ufer dringen" ("No song can reach me from the shore") is altered to "Kann kein Lied zum Ufer dringen" ("No song can reach me to the shore"). While this could be interpreted as a copying error, some scholars, such as Rufus Hallmark, believe the change was intentional, and that Schubert deliberately changed the preposition to realign the text's perspective with that of the narrator.

Auf dem Strom
Nimm die letzten Abschiedsküsse,
Und die wehenden, die Grüße,
Die ich noch ans Ufer sende,
Eh' dein Fuss sich scheidend wende!
Schon wird von des Stromes Wogen
Rasch der Nachen fortgezogen,
Doch den tränendunklen Blick
Zieht die Sehnsucht stets zurück!

Und so trägt mich denn die Welle
Fort mit unerflehter Schnelle.
Ach, schon ist die Flur verschwunden,
Wo ich selig sie gefunden!
Ewig hin, ihr Wonnetage!
Hoffnungsleer verhallt die Klage
Um das schöne Heimatland,
Wo ich ihre Liebe fand.

Sieh, wie flieht der Strand vorüber,
Und wie drängt es mich hinüber,
Zieht mit unnennbaren Banden,
An der Hütte dort zu landen,
In der Laube dort zu weilen;
Doch des Stromes Wellen eilen
Weiter ohne Rast und Ruh,
Führen mich dem Weltmeer zu!

Ach, vor jener dunklen Wüste,
Fern von jeder heitern Küste,
Wo kein Eiland zu erschauen,
O, wie fasst mich zitternd Grauen!
Wehmutstränen sanft zu bringen,
Kann kein Lied vom Ufer dringen;
Nur der Sturm weht kalt daher
Durch das grau gehobne Meer!

Kann des Auges sehnend Schweifen
Keine Ufer mehr ergreifen,
Nun so schau’ ich zu den Sternen
Auf in jenen heilgen Fernen!
Ach, bei ihrem milden Scheine
Nannt ich sie zuerst die Meine;
Dort vielleicht, o tröstend Glück!
Dort begegn' ich ihrem Blick.

== Music ==
"Auf dem Strom" is in five-section ABABA form with one section for one verse of Rellstab's poem. Johnson calls this an "interleaving binary structure". The piece opens with a 17-bar introduction and ends with a 27-bar coda. This choice of form, as opposed to the more typical strophic form, allows for a similar alternating design in the lied as in the poem; the A sections, the odd-numbered stanzas, are in the home key of E major, and the B sections, the even-numbered stanzas, are in the relative minor key of C-sharp minor. Each section is bridged by an interlude for horn and piano alone. In the first stanza, the music moves from E major to E minor at the mention of the waves ("Schon wird von des Stromes Wogen"), and then hints at a modulation to G major, which is interrupted by an intrusion of D♯, the leading tone of E major, which pulls the tonality back to the home key. In the third stanza, this modulation to G is realized.

A defining technical feature of "Auf dem Strom" is its allusions to Beethoven's music. Distinct nods to at least three Beethoven works have been identified by scholars and musicologists. The most often mentioned of these is a quotation from the second movement, the Marcia funebre, of Beethoven's Symphony No. 3 in E♭ major (Op. 55), the Eroica Symphony. Einstein remarked early on that "if any of Schubert's songs was influenced by the spirit and 'sentiment' of Beethoven's An die ferne Geliebte (Op. 98), it was ["Auf dem Strom"]", and Hallmark believes the coda of the work was modelled on Beethoven's coda in "An die ferne Geliebte". In addition, Hamberlin has identified that the opening melody of the horn quotes, almost identically, bars 26–36 of the first horn part in the final movement of Beethoven's Symphony No. 5 in C minor (Op. 67).

== Publication and manuscripts ==
The first edition of "Auf dem Strom" was published in October 1829 by the publishing company of Maximilian Joseph Leidesdorf, as op. posth. 119. It was then published by Anton Diabelli's firm shortly after, with a cello part included as an alternative to the horn part. According to Elisabeth Föhrenbach and Annette Oppermann of G. Henle Verlag, the first edition was based not on the autograph but on another secondary source that has since been lost. The autograph survives and is housed today at the Houghton Library at Harvard University.

== Sources ==
- Bodley, Lorraine Byrne (2023). Schubert: A Musical Wayfarer. New Haven: Yale University Press. ISBN 978-0-300-20408-7.
- Einstein, Alfred (1951). Schubert: A Musical Portrait. Oxford University Press.
- Hallmark, Rufus (1982) [1976]. "Schubert's 'Auf dem Strom'". In Badura-Skoda, Eva; Branscombe, Peter (eds.). Schubert Studies: Problems of Style and Chronology. Cambridge: Cambridge University Press. pp. 25–46. ISBN 0-521-22606-6.
- Hamberlin, Larry (2008). "The Beethoven Allusions in "Auf dem Strom" (D.943)". In Reul, Barbara M.; Bodley, Lorraine Byrne (eds.). The Unknown Schubert. Burlington: Ashgate. pp. 137–144. ISBN 978-0-7546-6192-4.
- Johnson, Graham (2000). Schubert: The Complete Songs, Vol. 37 (CD booklet). London: Hyperion Records. CDJ33037.
- McKay, Elizabeth Norman (1996). Franz Schubert: A Biography. Oxford University Press. ISBN 978-0-19-816681-8.
- Newbould, Brian (1999). Schubert: The Music and the Man. University of California Press. ISBN 978-0-520-21957-1.
- Oppermann, Annette; Föhrenbach, Elisabeth (2019). "Comments". Auf dem Strom (On the River) D 943: For Voice, Horn (Violoncello) and Piano (PDF) (in German, English, and French). Munich: G. Henle Verlag. p. 19–28. HN 1147.
- Oppermann, Annette; Föhrenbach, Elisabeth (2019). "Preface". Auf dem Strom (On the River) D 943: For Voice, Horn (Violoncello) and Piano (PDF) (in German, English, and French). Munich: G. Henle Verlag. p. IV–V. HN 1147.
