= Trios, Op. 1 (Stamitz) =

The Orchestral Trios, Op. 1 was the first publication of a work by Jan Václav Stamitz and one of the two prints issued during his lifetime. It was a famous and influential set of six orchestral trios. Most likely its composition dates from the 1750s.
