= Carl Stamitz =

German composer (1745–1801)

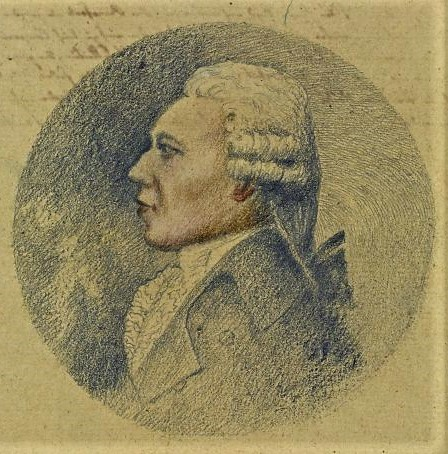
Carl Stamitz

Carl Philipp Stamitz (Czech: Karel Stamic; born in Mannheim and baptized 8 May 1745 – 9 November 1801), was a German composer of partial Czech ancestry of the Classical era. He was the most prominent representative of the second generation of the Mannheim School.

He was the eldest son of Johann Stamitz, a violinist and composer of the early classical period. He received lessons from his father and Christian Cannabich, his father's successor as leader of the Mannheim orchestra. As a youth, Stamitz was employed as a violinist in the court orchestra at Mannheim. In 1770, he began travelling as a virtuoso, accepting short-term engagements, but never managing to gain a permanent position. He visited a number of European cities, living for a time in Strasbourg and London. In 1794, he gave up travelling and moved with his family to Jena in central Germany. His circumstances deteriorated and he descended into debt and poverty, dying in 1801. Many tracts on alchemy were found in his library after his death.

Stamitz wrote symphonies, symphonies concertantes, and concertos for clarinet, cello, flute, oboe, bassoon, basset horn, violin, viola, viola d'amore, and different combinations of these instruments. Some of his clarinet and viola concertos are particularly admired. He also wrote duos, trios, and quartets. Two operas, Der verliebte Vormund and Dardanus, are now lost.

Stylistically, his music resembles that of Mozart or Haydn and is characterized by appealing melodies, although his writing for the solo instruments is not excessively virtuosic. The opening movements of his orchestral works, which are in sonata form, are generally followed by expressive and lyrical middle movements and the final movements in the form of a rondo.

== Biography ==
=== Early life in Mannheim ===
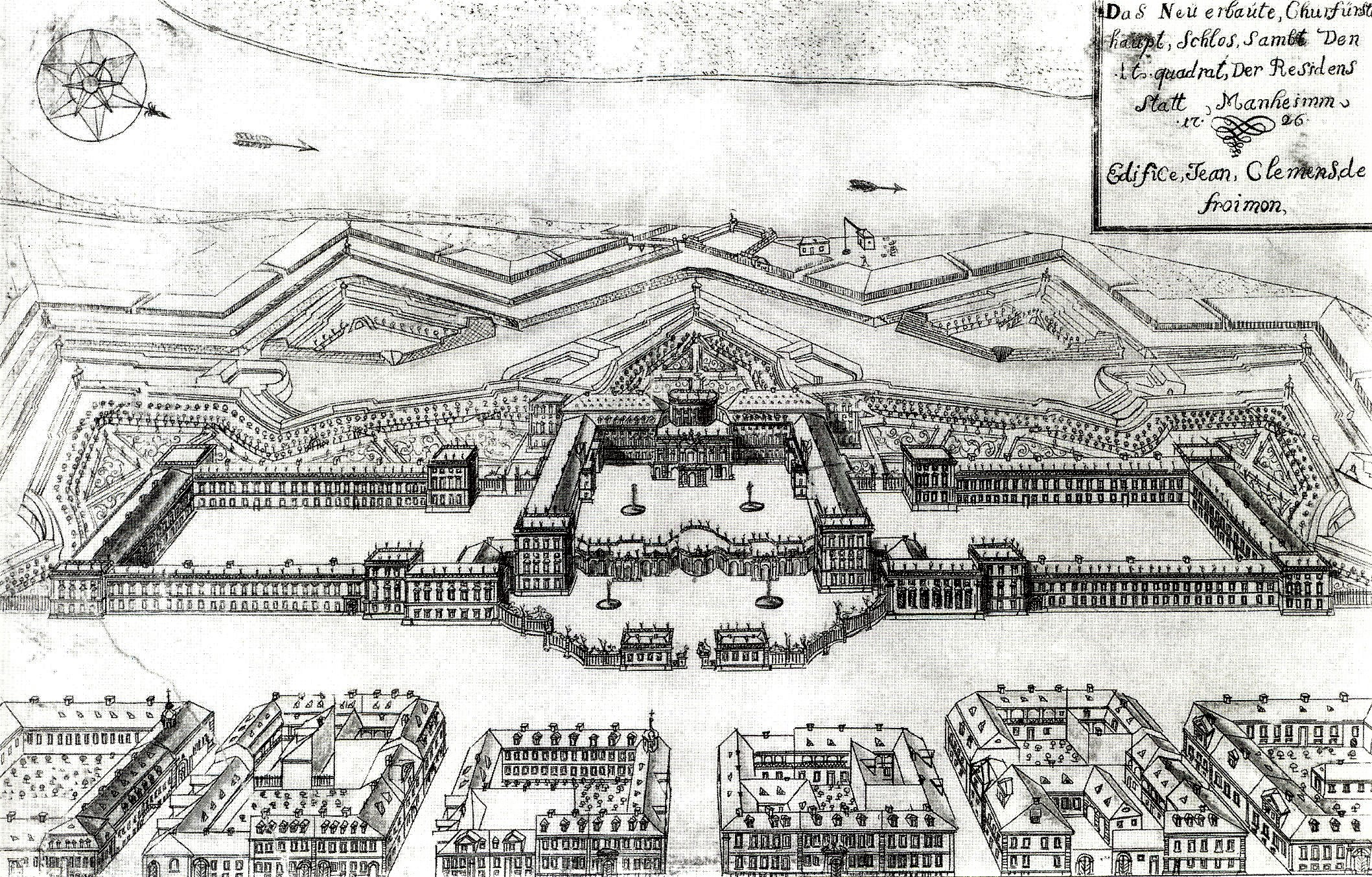
Mannheim Palace in the eighteenth century

Carl Stamitz was born at Mannheim and baptized on 8 May 1745, the eldest son of Maria Antonia Luneborn and Johann Stamitz, a violinist and composer of the early classical era. Johann Stamitz was the leader of the highly-reputed court orchestra at Mannheim Palace and he trained the orchestra to be disciplined and technically polished. The players created a sensation with their ability to play with subtlety and precision, as well as with a great dynamic range.

Carl received his first lessons in violin and musical composition from his father. After Johann Stamitz's death in 1757, the 12-year-old Stamitz was taught by the composer Christian Cannabich, his father's successor as concert-master and leader of the Mannheim orchestra. Ignaz Holzbauer, the court-director of music. The court-composer Franz Xaver Richter also had a hand in the boy's education.

=== Early career ===
By the time he was seventeen, Stamitz was employed as a violinist in the court orchestra. In 1770, he resigned from his post and began travelling. As a travelling virtuoso on the violin, the viola, and viola d'amore, Stamitz often accepted short-term engagements, but never managed to gain a permanent position with one of the European princes nor in one of the orchestras of his time.

In 1770 he went to Paris, where his father had a yearlong professional stay in Paris in 1754 that had been very successful before returning to Mannheim. Initially, Stamitz went into service with Louis, Duke of Noailles, who made him his court composer. He also appeared in the Concerts Spirituels, sometimes together with his brother Anton, who probably had come to Paris with him. With Paris as his base, he made frequent concert tours to a number of German cities: on 12 April 1773, he appeared in Frankfurt; a year later he was in Augsburg; and in 1775, he ventured as far as the Russian capital, Saint Petersburg. In 1777, he dwelt for a time in Strasbourg where Franz Xaver Richter was music director.

During the years 1777 and 1778, he was successful in London, one of many Austro-German musicians, such as Carl Friedrich Abel, J. C. Bach, and in his last years Haydn, to be drawn there. His stay in London may have been facilitated through his contact with Thomas Erskine, Earl of Kellie (1753–1781), who had received lessons from Carl's father Johann during a tour of the continent. Between 1782 and 1783, Stamitz gave concerts in The Hague and in Amsterdam. In 1785, he returned to Germany to appear in concerts in Hamburg, Lübeck, Braunschweig, Magdeburg, and Leipzig. In April 1786, he made his way to Berlin, where on 19 May 1786 he participated in the performance of Handel's Messiah, under the baton of Johann Adam Hiller.

He later travelled to Dresden, Prague, Halle, and then Nuremberg, where on 3 November 1787 he staged a Great Allegorical Musical Festivity in Two Acts in celebration of the balloon ascent of the French aviation pioneer Jean-Pierre Blanchard. During the winter of 1789–90 he directed the amateur concerts in Kassel, but failed to gain an employment with the Schwerin court. By now married and the father of four young children, he was forced to resume a life of travelling.

On 12 November 1792, he gave a concert in the Weimar court theatre that was then under the direction of Goethe. In 1793, he undertook a last journey along the River Rhine to his native Mannheim, before he finally gave up travelling.

Sometime in the winter of 1794–95, he moved his family to the university town of Jena in central Germany.

=== Final years ===
During the years Stamitz spent at Jena, there was neither a town band nor an orchestra to speak of. According to some sources, he was in some way connected to the university, but this seems a matter of dispute. Stamitz gradually descended into poverty.

After his death in November 1801, a substantial number of tracts on alchemy were found in his library. Because of this it is thought that he dabbled in attempts at making gold.

== Music ==
Carl Stamitz wrote more than 50 symphonies, at least 38 symphonies concertantes, and more than 60 concertos for violin, viola, viola d'amore, cello, clarinet, basset horn, flute, bassoon, and other instruments. He also wrote a large volume of chamber music. Some of the clarinet and viola concertos that Stamitz composed are considered to be among the finest available from the period.

During the period when he lived in Paris, Stamitz began to cooperate with the Bohemian born clarinet virtuoso Joseph Beer (1744–1811), which proved fruitful for both Stamitz and Beer. At least one of Stamitz's clarinet concertos (the concerto No. 6 in E-flat major) seems to have been composed jointly by the two men, as both of their names appear on the title page of the Viennese manuscript. Stamitz was the first composer to specify a left-hand pizzicato (an important virtuoso device) in a musical composition. This occurs in his Viola Concerto in D major, where the passage in question is designated by an "0" above the notes.

Stamitz's cello concertos were written for Frederick William II of Prussia, who was a gifted amateur musician for whom both Mozart and Beethoven also wrote music.

=== Style ===
Stylistically, Stamitz's music is not too far removed from the galante works of the young Mozart, or those of Haydn's middle period. Stamitz's works are characterized by regular periods and appealing melodies, with the voices quite often led in thirds, sixths, and tenths. His writing for the solo instruments is idiomatic and virtuosic, but never described as excessively so. His third clarinet concerto is noted as "in the style of Mozart", but even his tenth reminds one of Mozart.

The opening movements of Stamitz's concertos and orchestral works are regularly constructed in sonata form, with an extensive double exposition. Their structure is additive in nature and does not exhibit the thematic development that is considered typical of the Viennese classical style. The middle movements are expressive and lyrical, sometimes called 'Romance' and usually constructed according to the Liedform (ABA, ABA' or AA'B). The final movement is often (and in the concertos, almost always) a French-style rondo.

Just as his teacher Franz Xaver Richter had done, Stamitz preferred minor keys, as he generally used a variety of (sometimes remote) keys.

== Works (selection) ==
Symphonies

- 50 symphonies (usually in three movements omitting the minuet)

Concertos

- 3 cello concertos
- 11 clarinet concertos (at least one jointly composed with Johann Joseph Beer (1744–1811)
- 40 concertos for flute, bassoon, basset horn, violin, viola, viola d'amore, and different combinations of some of these instruments
- Viola concerto no. 1 in D major
- 38 symphonies concertantes

Chamber music

- Duos, trios, quartets for various instruments, with a prevalence of strings; the unaccompanied duos for violin and viola are particularly notable
- 6 orchestral quartets, op.1
- 6 orchestral quartets, op.14

Operas Both are considered lost

- Der verliebte Vormund (1787)
- Dardanus (1780)

== Discography (selection) ==
- Symfonies concertante, Vienna Symphony, Henry Swoboda, conductor, Westminster, WL 50-17 (WL-17 A-WL-17 B), 1950.
- Four Quartets for Winds and Strings, Nonesuch Records, H-71125, c. 1966.
- Chamber music. Selections, Musical Heritage Society, MHS 1403, 1972.
- Cello Concertos Christian Benda with the Prague Chamber Orchestra, Naxos 8.550865, 1994
- Carl Stamitz: Four Symphonies, London Mozart Players, Matthias Bamert, conductor, Chandos Records, Chan 9358, 1995.
- Carl Stamitz: Clarinet Concertos, Sabine Meyer, Academy of St. Martin in the Fields, Iona Brown, conductor, EMI Classics, CDC 754842-2, 1993.

== Sources ==
- Melkus, Eduard (1984). "Italienische Merkmale in der Mannheimer Violintechnik". In Würtz, Roland (ed.). Mannheim und Italien – Zur Vorgeschichte der Mannheimer (in German). Mainz: Schott. pp. 200–207. ISBN 978-3-7957-1326-3.
- Randel, Don Michael, ed. (1996). The Harvard Biographical Dictionary of Music. Cambridge, Massachusetts: Harvard University Press. ISBN 978-06743-7-299-3.
- Roeder, Michael Thomas (1994). A History of the Concerto. Portland, Oregon: Amadeus Press. ISBN 978-09313-4-061-1.
