= Anton Stamitz =

German composer and violinist

Anton Thadäus Johann Nepomuk Stamitz (November 1750 – c. 1798–1809) was a German composer and violinist. He was born in the Holy Roman Empire.

Anton was born during a family visit to Německý Brod and baptised there on 27 November 1750. He and his brother Carl received their first violin instruction from their father Johann. After their father's death in 1757 they were taken on as students by Christian Cannabich, who had been a student of their father's. Both were by this time already violinists in the Mannheimer Kapelle and participated in its development.

In 1770, with his brother Carl, he visited Paris and established himself there. Between 1782 and 1789 he played in the King's court orchestra in Versailles, and obtained the title ordinaire de la musique du roi. He was the violin teacher of Rodolphe Kreutzer.

His biography after the French Revolution in 1789 is not known, but he probably died in Paris or Versailles. He may have died as late as 1809.

== Selected list of works ==
Caprice No. 1 – Allegro Moderato

Caprice No. 8 – Allemande
Both pieces are from Eight Caprices by A. Stamitz featuring Kristina Martincová on flute

- Three sets of symphonies: 3 as Op. 1 (1783–1784), 3 as Op. 2 (1784), 6 as Op. 3 (c.1785–1788), 3 as Op. 4 (c.1788–1793)
- At least four concertos, in B-flat, F (1779), G and D, for viola d'amore, now also performed on the viola
- About twenty violin concertos
- Several flute concertos
- A concerto for two flutes in G
- Four concertos for two clarinets or clarinet and violin
- Several string quartets and symphonies
- Caprices for solo flute (partially not authentic, four caprices, no. 5–8 of the original print by Baillon, are almost certainly by Joseph Tacet from his op. 1)
- Six duos for two flutes, published as his Opus 1
- A sinfonia concertante in D for two flutes and orchestra
