= Symphony No. 1 (Furtwängler) =

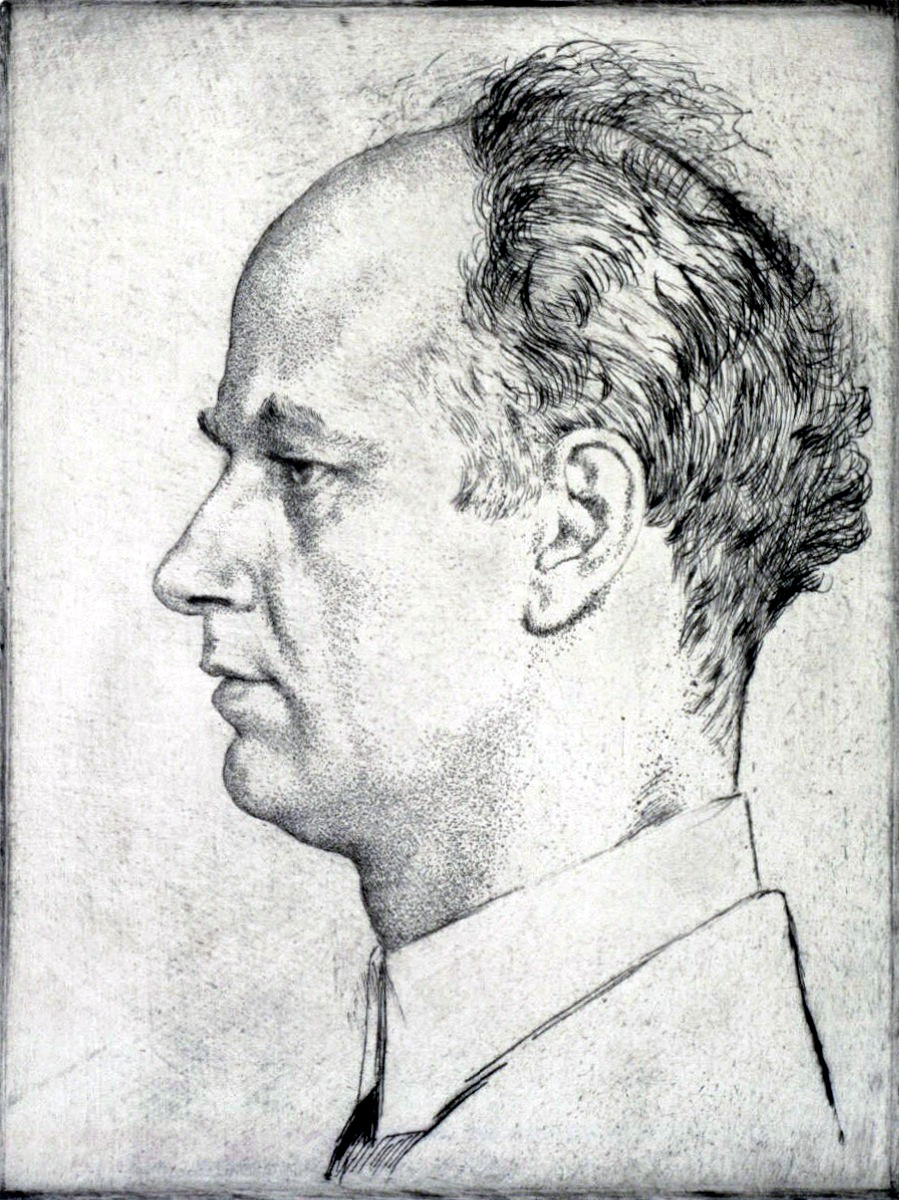
Etching of Furtwängler from 1928

Wilhelm Furtwängler's Symphony No. 1 in B minor, written between 1938 and 1941, is based on an earlier piece he wrote, a Largo in B minor from 1908. To this he added three more movements for a four-movement work:

1. Largo
2. Scherzo. Allegro
3. Adagio
4. Moderato assai

== Discography ==
Unlike his later two symphonies, Furtwängler himself never recorded this one. The work lasts about 80 minutes and has been recorded at least three times: George Alexander Albrecht's interpretation on Arte Nova Classics requires two discs, while Alfred Walter conducting the Slovak State Philharmonic Orchestra, Košice only needs one Marco Polo CD.

Fawzi Haimor conducting the Württembergische Philharmonie Reutlingen for CPO takes 88 minutes and therefore needs two CDs.
