= Symphony No. 39 (Michael Haydn) =

Symphony in three movements by Michael Haydn

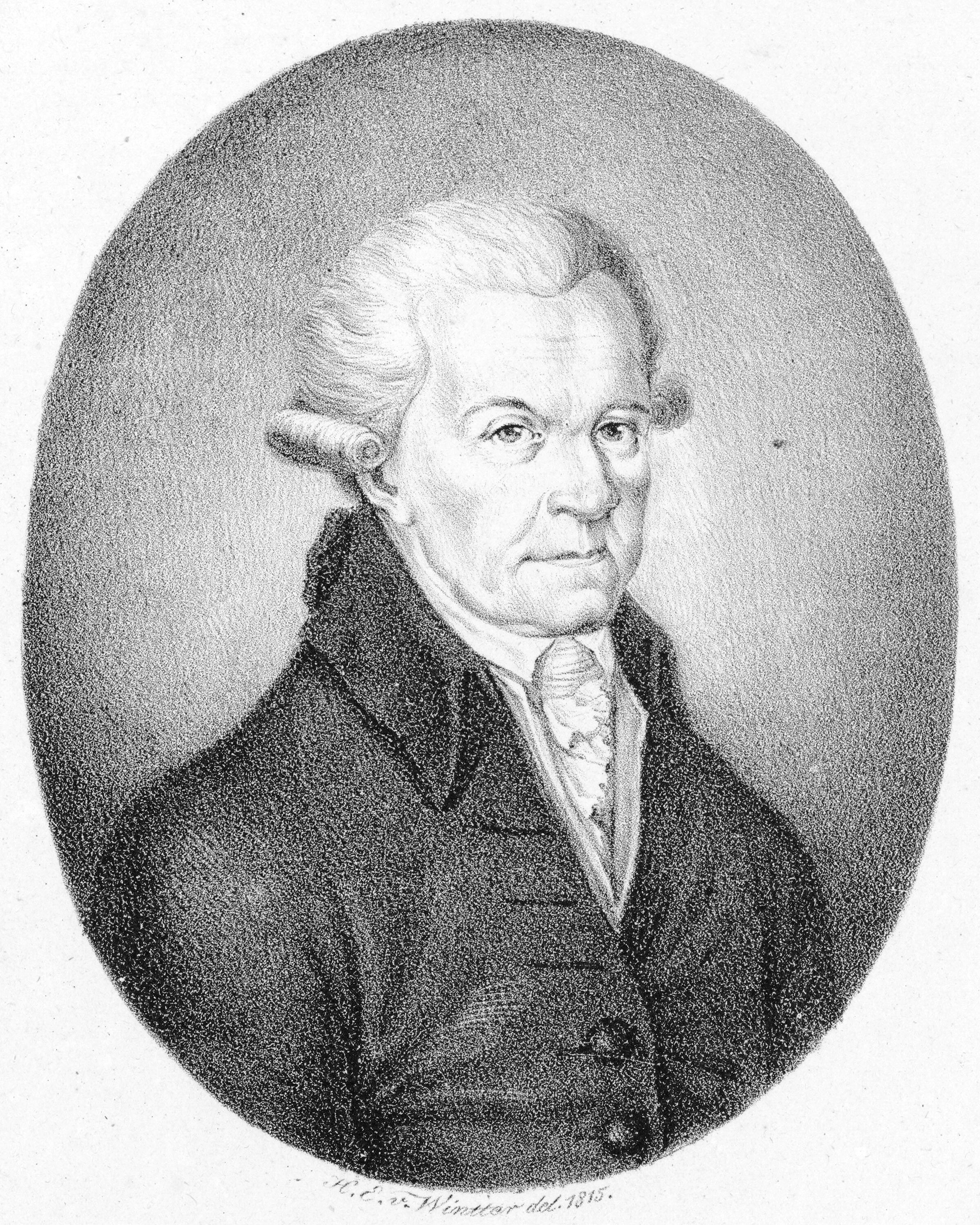
Portrait of composer Michael Haydn

Michael Haydn's Symphony No. 39 in C major, Perger 31, Sherman 39, MH 478, written in Salzburg in 1788, is the last C major symphony he wrote, the sixth of his final set of six symphonies.

== Music ==
The symphony is scored for two oboes, two bassoons, two horns, two trumpets, timpani, and strings. The edition by H. C. Robbins Landon for Verlag Doblinger has the cellos and basses on the same staff for most of the work even though the cellos occasionally are independent of the bassoons and basses in the first movement. Close to the beginning of the third movement it becomes necessary to split the cellos and basses on to different staves as the cellos switch to tenor clef and double the violas, leaving the bass to the bassoons and basses.

The symphony has three movements:

1. Allegro con spirito
2. Andante, in G major
3. Fugato. Molto vivace

The first movement is notable for its use of horns in G instead of the usual horns in C (compare Haydn's earlier C major symphonies and those of his brother Joseph), so that the horns can participate in the harmonization of ii chords. The music begins straightaway with a triadic theme and bass on the beat, offset by half-beat syncopation in the second violins and violas.

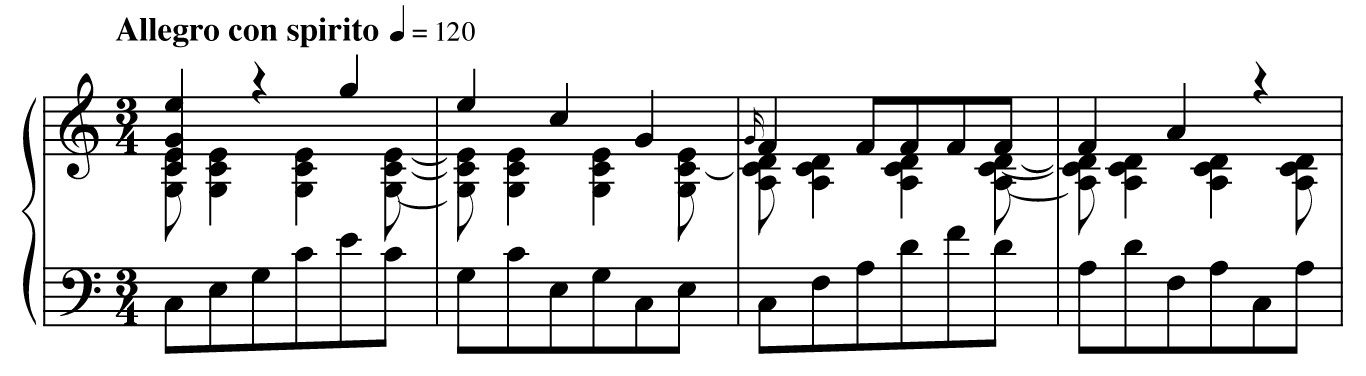

For the recapitulation, the horns change to horns in C. There are even more horn crook changes in store for the players: in the second movement, the first horn switches to horn in E while the second player switches to horn in D, "a clever use ... to increase the range of notes available on instruments without valves." Robbins Landon also points out that in the Andante of this symphony of Haydn's uses the low C of the second trumpet, something Mozart also did later when he wrote his Symphony No. 41 ("Jupiter") (also written in 1788).

The last movement is a vigorous fugato, something else this work has in common with Mozart's Symphony No. 41 and Haydn's own Symphony No. 28 which Mozart certainly studied. Unlike the Jupiter Symphony, in this symphony the fugal theme is at its first instance accompanied by its usual countersubject:

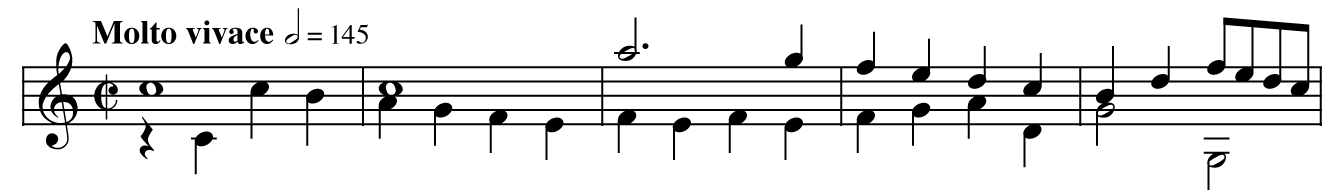

Robbins Landon speculates that Mozart also studied Haydn's No. 39 before writing his No. 41, since he "often requested his father Leopold to send him the latest fugue that Haydn had written." (Robbins Landon, 1967) Whether Mozart knew Haydn's later C major symphony has not been proven conclusively by historical means, but Alfred Einstein ranks among the convinced, because of comparisons of the music. As in the first movement, in the last movement the two horns again begin in G and switch to in C for the recapitulation.

According to Leopold Mozart, Michael Haydn considered continuo to be essential even for his most fully instrumented works. Yet only one recording of Symphony No. 39 uses harpsichord continuo, Pál Németh with Capella Savaria; the bass line for the figured bass realization is the bassoons' and not the celli's. Neither Johannes Goritzki nor Hans-Peter Frank have continuo in their recordings.
