= Symphony in D major, Op. 3, No. 2 (Stamitz) =

Symphony by Johann Stamitz

The Symphony in D major, Op. 3, No. 2 is a symphony by Johann Stamitz, written in the early 1750s in the style of the Mannheim school and published in Paris in 1757. It consists of four movements:

1. Presto
2. Andantino
3. Menuetto – Trio
4. Prestissimo

It is about 10 minutes long. This symphony is also notable for being one of the first to give distinct independence to the flutes and oboes, rather than having them simply reinforce the first violin part, as had been the convention for earlier symphonic works.
