= Symphony in B-flat major "Mannheim No. 3" (Stamitz) =

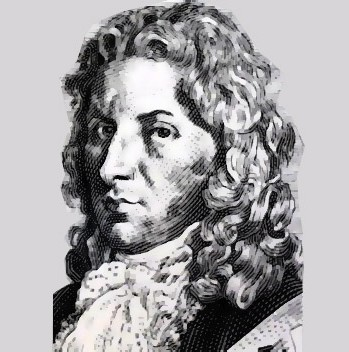
Johann Stamitz

The Symphony in B♭ major ("Mannheim No. 3") is a symphony by Johann Stamitz, written in the style of the Mannheim school sometime from 1741 to 1746. It might be Stamitz' first symphony. It consists of three movements:

1. Alla breve
2. Andante
3. Allegro

It is about 8 minutes long.

== See also ==
- Symphony in G major "Mannheim No. 1" (Stamitz)
- Symphony in A major "Mannheim No. 2" (Stamitz)
