= E major =

Major key and scale based on E

- Relative key: C-sharp minor
- Parallel key: E minor
- Dominant key: B major
- Subdominant key: A major

Component pitches
- E, F♯, G♯, A, B, C♯, D♯

E major is a major scale based on E, consisting of the pitches E, F♯, G♯, A, B, C♯, and D♯. Its key signature has four sharps. Its relative minor is C-sharp minor and its parallel minor is E minor. Its enharmonic equivalent, F-flat major, has six flats and the double-flat B, which makes that key less convenient to use.

The E major scale is:

Changes needed for the melodic and harmonic versions of the scale are written in with accidentals as necessary. The E harmonic major and melodic major scales are:

== Scale degree chords ==
The scale degree chords of E major are:

- Tonic – E major
- Supertonic – F-sharp minor
- Mediant – G-sharp minor
- Subdominant – A major
- Dominant – B major
- Submediant – C-sharp minor
- Leading-tone – D-sharp diminished

== Music in E major ==
Antonio Vivaldi used this key for the "Spring" concerto from The Four Seasons.

Johann Sebastian Bach used E major for a violin concerto, as well as for his third partita for solo violin; the key is especially appropriate for the latter piece because its tonic (E) and subdominant (A) correspond to open strings on the violin, enhancing the tone colour (and ease of playing) of the bariolage in the first movement.

Only two of Joseph Haydn's 106 symphonies are in E major: No. 12 and No. 29. Furthermore, four string quartets (Op. 2/2 and Op. 3/1), Op. 17/1 and Op. 54/3), two piano trios (No. 11 and No. 44) and three piano sonatas (No. 13, 22 and 31) are in E major.

Luigi Boccherini's String Quintet, Op. 11, No. 5 is in E major.

Wolfgang Amadeus Mozart completed only two compositions in E major: the Adagio for Violin and Orchestra K. 261 and the Piano Trio No. 4 K. 542. A noteworthy fragment among Mozart's works for horn and orchestra, K. 494a, is likewise in E major.

Antonio Rosetti wrote several concertos for one and two horns.

Marianna Martines wrote a keyboard concerto and a keyboard sonata in E major.

Joseph Martin Kraus wrote a keyboard sonata in E major (VB 196).

Nikolaus von Krufft wrote a sonata for horn and piano in E major.

Josef Mysliveček wrote a violin concerto in E major, and so did Johann Wenzel Kalliwoda with his concertino for violin Op. 15.

Ludwig van Beethoven used E major for two of his piano sonatas, Op. 14/1 and Op. 109, and for the ouverture to his opera Fidelio.

Starting with Beethoven's Piano Concerto No. 3, several works in the key of C minor began to have slow movements in E major, three examples of which are Johannes Brahms' First Symphony and Piano Quartet No. 3, and Sergei Rachmaninoff's Piano Concerto No. 2.

Johann Nepomuk Hummel composed a Trumpet Concerto in E major.

Carl Loewe composed a piano sonata in this key: Grande Sonate in E major, Op. 16, and so did Ignaz Moscheles in his Op. 41.

Václav Jindřich Veit wrote a string quartet in E major, Op. 5, and Karl Schuberth wrote his string octet Op. 23 in this key..

The second movement of Schubert's Symphony No. 8 is in E major, as well as the piano sonatas D. 157, 157 and 459, the rondo from 566 (506), String Quartet D. 353, the middle movement of the Arpeggione Sonata. Several Schubert works end with numbers in E major, such as Die schöne Müllerin, 6 Grandes Marches D. 819 and the 6 Polonaises D. 824. Another notable lied in E major is "Auf dem Strom" for voice, horn and piano.

The andante which serves as an introduction to the Rondo Capriccioso Op. 14 by Felix Mendelssohn is in E major, as well as the Concerto for Two Pianos and Orchestra in E major.

Frédéric Chopin's First Piano Concerto starts in E minor, but the last two movements are in E major. His Étude Op. 10, No. 3, one of his best known works, is in E major. His last Nocturne, Op. 62 No. 2, and his final Scherzo No. 4, are also in E major. A lesser-known work in the key is the Moderato in E major, WN 56. Another work in the key, written jointly with Auguste Franchomme, is the Grand Duo concertant for cello and piano.

Moritz Moszkowski wrote his Piano Concerto Op. 59 in E major.

Antonín Dvořák wrote his Serenade for Strings Op. 22 in the key of E major.

Charles-Valentin Alkan wrote Cello Sonata in E major, and so did Franz Xaver Wolfgang Mozart in his Op. 19.

Adolphe Blanc's Septet for clarinet, bassoon, horn, violin, viola, cello and double bass Op. 40 is in E major.

In the 19th century, symphonies in this key were rare, with Anton Bruckner's Symphony No. 7 being one of very few examples (see list of symphonies in E major). For Bruckner, "the key of E major is frequently associated with music of contemplation".

Alexander Scriabin composed his First Symphony in E.

Two symphonies that begin in D minor and end in E major are Havergal Brian's Symphony No. 1 (Gothic) and Carl Nielsen's Symphony No. 4.

More typically, however, some symphonies that begin in E minor switch to E major for the finale, such as Sergei Rachmaninoff's Symphony No. 2, Pyotr Ilyich Tchaikovsky's Symphony No. 5 and Dmitri Shostakovich's Symphony No. 10.

In Gioachino Rossini's William Tell Overture, the first movement and the finale are in E major. Richard Wagner's Tannhäuser overture is also in E major. Another notable composition by the latter in E major is Siegfried Idyll.

The first of Claude Debussy's Two Arabesques, L. 66, is in E major.

The vast majority of Franz Liszt's Consolations are in E major, as are Nos. 4 and 5 from Grandes études de Paganini.

Edvard Grieg's Morning Mood, part of Peer Gynt Suite No. 1, Op. 46, is in E major.

== See also ==
- List of symphonies in E major
- Key (music)
- Major and minor
- Chord (music)
- Chord notation
- F flat major

No.	Flats		Sharps	
No.	Major	minor	Major	minor
0	C	a	C	a
1	F	d	G	e
2	B♭	g	D	b
3	E♭	c	A	f♯
4	A♭	f	E	c♯
5	D♭	b♭	B	g♯
6	G♭	e♭	F♯	d♯
7	C♭	a♭	C♯	a♯
8	F♭	d♭	G♯	e♯
