= Piano Concerto No. 1 (Glazunov) =

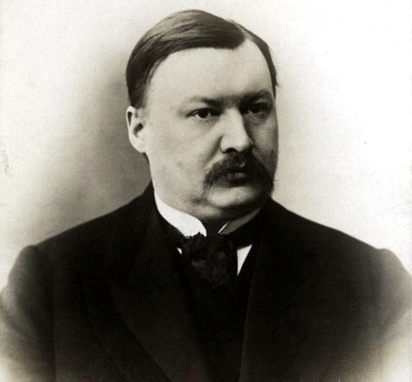
Alexander Glazunov before 1913

Alexander Glazunov composed his Piano Concerto No. 1 in F minor, Opus, 92, in 1911, during his tenure as director of the St. Petersburg Conservatory. The concerto is dedicated to Leopold Godowsky, whom Glazunov had heard on tour in St. Petersburg in 1905.

== Form ==
The concerto is written in two movements, the second being a theme and variations forming an amalgam of slow movement, scherzando elements and finale (coda).

1. Allegro moderato
2. Tema con variazoni
  1. Tema (Andante tranquilo)
  2. Variation I
  3. Variation II (chromatica) Andantino
  4. Variation III (Eroica) Allegro moderato)
  5. Variation IV (lyrica) Adagio
  6. Variation V (Intermezzo) Allegro
  7. Variation VI (quasi una fantasia) Lento
  8. Variation VII Mazurka: Allegretto
  9. Variation VIII Scherzo: Allegro ma non troppo
  10. Variation IX Finale: Allegro moderato

== Bibliography ==
- Pott, Francis, Notes for Hyperion CDA66877: Glazunov: Piano Concertos; Goedicke: Concertstück; Stephen Coombs, piano; BBC Scottish Symphony Orchestra conducted by Martyn Brabbins.
