= Symphony in G major "Mannheim No. 1" (Stamitz) =

The Symphony in G major ("Mannheim No. 1") is a symphony in the style of the Mannheim school, attributed to Johann Stamitz, but probably by Antoine Mahaut, a close contemporary of the composer. It was probably written from 1741 to 1746, and if it is by Stamitz, it could be his first. But if it is by Mahaut, it probably is his first. It consists of three movements:

1. Allegro
2. Larghetto
3. Presto

It is about 7 minutes long.

== See also ==
- Symphony in A major "Mannheim No. 2" (Stamitz)
- Symphony in B-flat major "Mannheim No. 3" (Stamitz)
