= Johann Stamitz =

Czech composer and violinist

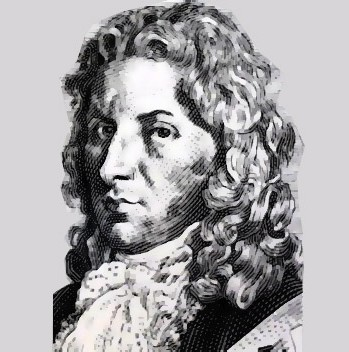
- Johann Stamitz
- Born: 18 June 1717; Deutschbrod, Bohemia
- Died: 18 April 1757 (aged 39); Mannheim, Holy Roman Empire
- Known for: Founder of the Mannheim school

Johann Wenzel Anton Stamitz (Czech: Jan Václav Antonín Stamic; 18 June 1717 – 27 March 1757) was a Czech composer and violinist. Stamitz is considered the founding father of the Mannheim school, a composition style that his two surviving sons, Carl and Anton Stamitz, continued. His music is stylistically transitional between the Baroque and Classical periods and he is recognised for many innovations.

== Life ==
Stamitz was born in Deutschbrod, Bohemia (now Havlíčkův Brod, Czech Republic), into a family that came from Marburg (now Maribor, Slovenia).

Stamitz spent the academic year 1734–1735 at the University of Prague. After only one year, at the likely age of seventeen he left the university to pursue a career as a violin virtuoso. His activities during the six-year period between his departure from the university in 1735 and his appointment in the German city of Mannheim around 1741, are not known in detail and historical accounts of his life contain many presumptions or approximations.

He was appointed by the Mannheim court in 1741 or 1742, likely at the age of twenty-four. His engagement there most likely resulted from contacts made during the Bohemian campaign and coronation of Charles VII of Bavaria, a close ally of the Elector Palatine. In January 1742, Stamitz performed before the Mannheim court as part of the festivities surrounding the marriage of Charles Theodore, who succeeded his uncle Karl Philipp as Elector Palatine less than a year later. Carl Albert, who became the Holy Roman Emperor on January 24, was among the wedding guests.

Stamitz married Maria Antonia Luneborn on 1 July 1744. They had five children together, Carl Philipp, Maria Franziska, Anton Thadäus Nepomuk, and two children who died in infancy.

Probably around the late summer of 1754, Stamitz paid a yearlong visit to Paris, perhaps at the invitation of music patron Alexandre Le Riche de La Poupelinière with whom he stayed. His first documented public appearance there was a performance at a Concert Spirituel on 8 September 1754 and he was well received by audiences. His Parisian success induced him to publish his Orchestral Trios, Op. 1 (symphonies for string orchestra), and possibly other works of his by various publishers located there.

He probably returned to Mannheim around the autumn of 1755, dying there in spring 1757, less than two years later, at the age of thirty-nine. The entry of his death reads: "30 March 1757. Buried, Jo'es Stainmiz, director of court music, so expert in his art that his equal will hardly be found. Rite provided".

== Compositions ==
Stamitz's most important compositions are his fifty-eight symphonies and what he described as his ten orchestral trios that properly are considered symphonies for strings, but may be played one player to a part as chamber music. His concertos include numerous ones for violin, two for viola, two for harpsichord, twelve for flute, one for oboe, one for trumpet, and one for clarinet, among the earliest concertos for the instrument (Johann Melchior Molter's six from the 1740s seem to have been the first). Stamitz also composed a large amount of chamber music for various instrumental combinations, as well as eight vocal works including his widely circulated concert Mass in D.

Because at least five other eighteenthth-century musicians bore the surname Stamitz, including four from Johann's immediate family, any attempt to catalog his or works by any of the others, is risky at best, principally in view of the many variations in spelling. Few difficulties arise in distinguishing between works by Johann Stamitz and those of his sons Carl and Anton, however.

By contrast, the relationship of the names 'Steinmetz' and 'Stamitz' has caused substantial confusion, given at least two other eighteenth-century musicians with the surname Steinmetz.

== Innovations in the Classical symphony ==
Johann Stamitz's expanded orchestration included important wind parts. His symphonies of the 1750s are scored in eight parts: four strings, two horns, and two oboes, although flutes or clarinets may substitute for the oboes. Horns provided not only a harmonic backdrop for strings, but solo lines as well. He was one of the first composers to write independent lines for oboes.

The chief innovation in Stamitz's symphonic works is their four-movement structure: fast – slow – minuet and trio – dashing presto or prestissimo finale. While prior isolated four-movement symphonies exist, Stamitz was the first composer to use it consistently: well more than half his symphonies and nine of his ten orchestral trios are in four movements. He also contributed to the development of sonata form, most often used in symphonic first movements, but occasionally in finales (when not in rondo form) and even slow movements (when not in ABA ternary form) as well.

Stamitz adapted and extended traits originally developed in Italian opera in his instrumental works as well. He added innovative dynamic devices such as extended crescendos, simple tutti chordal textures, and slow harmonic rhythm. Stamitz's compositions have a strong sense of rhythmic drive and distinctive thematic material, a characteristic similar to Italian operas.

== Selected works ==
- Trios, Op. 1
- Symphony in G major "Mannheim No. 1"
- Symphony in A major "Mannheim No. 2"
- Symphony in B♭ major "Mannheim No. 3"
- Symphony in D major, Op. 3 No. 2
- Symphony in D major, "La Melodia Germanica" Op. 11 No. 1
- Symphony in E♭ major, "La Melodia Germanica" Op. 11 No. 3
- Symphony in E♭ major, "La Melodia Germanica" Op. 11 No. 5
- Symphony in F major
- Missa Solemnis in D major
- Litaniae Lauretanae in C major
- Violin Concerto in C major
- Violin Concerto in B♭ major
- Clarinet Concerto in B♭ major
- Flute Concerto in C major
- Flute Concerto in D major
- Flute Concerto in G major
- Notturno in D major
