= Symphony in A major "Mannheim No. 2" (Stamitz) =

Symphony by Johann Stamitz

The Symphony in A major ("Mannheim No. 2") is a symphony by Johann Stamitz in the style of the Mannheim school, probably written sometime from 1741 to 1746. It might be Stamitz' first symphony. It consists of three movements:

1. Allegro
2. Andante
3. Presto

It is about 11 minutes long.

== See also ==
- Symphony in G major "Mannheim No. 1" (Stamitz)
- Symphony in B-flat major "Mannheim No. 3" (Stamitz)
