= Commemorative Cantata for the Centenary of the Birth of Pushkin =

Cantata by Alexander Glazunov

- by Alexander Glazunov
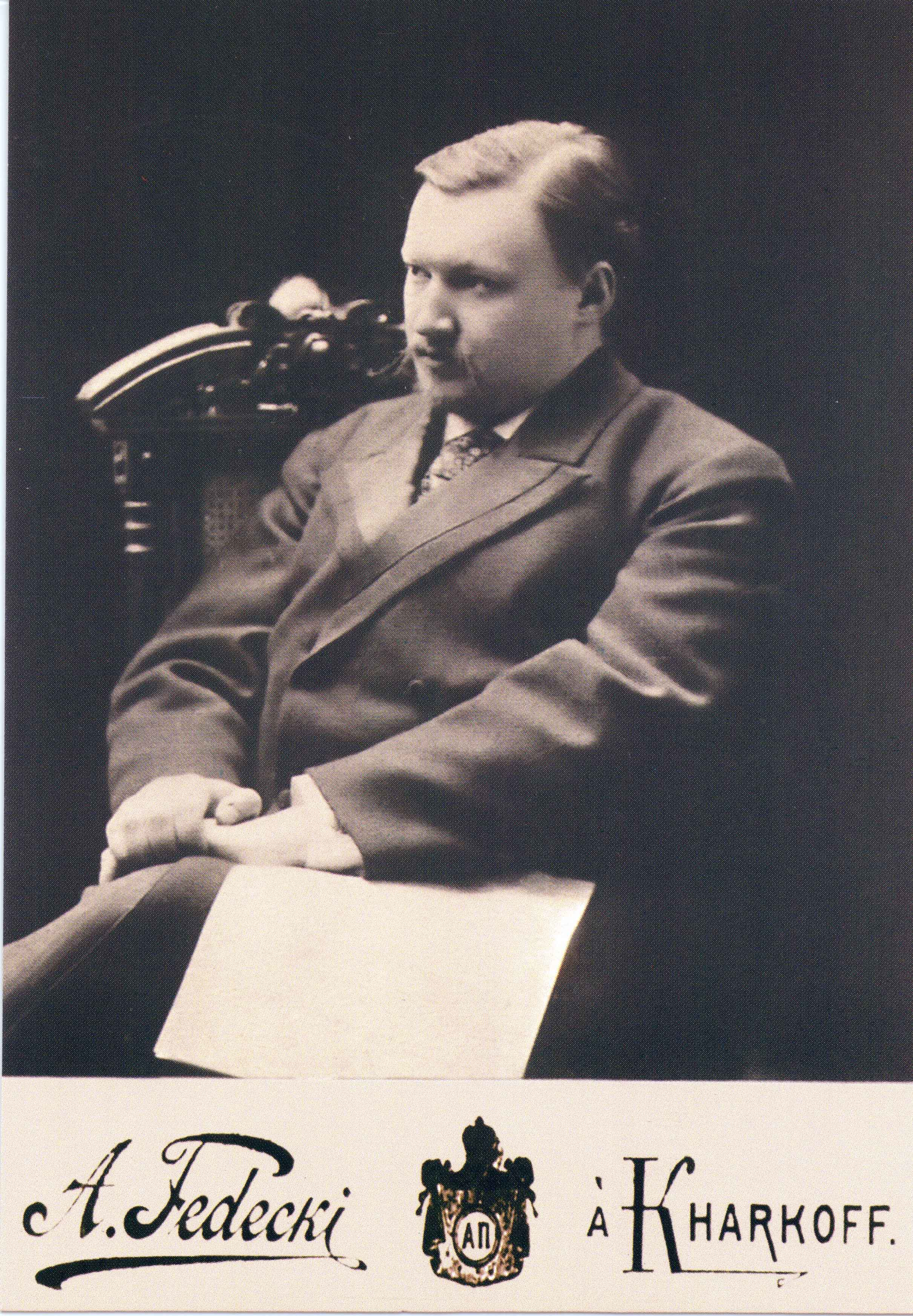
- The composer in 1899
- Opus: 65
- Occasion: Centenary of Alexander Pushkin
- Text: Konstantin Romanov
- Language: Russian
- Performed: 1899
- Movements: 5
- Scoring: Mezzo-soprano; Tenor; SATB choir; Piano

External images
- Original text of the cantata
- Page 1
- Page 2
- Page 3

Commemorative Cantata for the Centenary of the Birth of Pushkin (Russian: Торжественная кантата в память 100-летней годовщины А. С. Пушкина), Op. 65, is a cantata by Alexander Glazunov, composed in 1899 in memory of author Alexander Pushkin. It is also known as Memorial Cantata (Мемориальная кантата) and Cantata in Memory of Pushkin's 100th Birthday (Кантата к 100-летию А. С. Пушкина). The work in five movements on lyrics by Konstantin Romanov is scored for solo voices, choir and piano.

== History and text ==
Glazunov composed the cantata in 1899. That year, he assumed a position as professor of instrumentation at the St. Petersburg Conservatory of Music. In the cantata, he set a text by the Grand Duke Konstantin Romanov, written under his pen name K.R. It was first performed on 6 June [O.S. 26 May] 1899 to celebrate the centenary of Pushkin. Glazunov composed his ballet The Seasons, Op. 67, the same year.

== Scoring and structure ==
The cantata is structured in five movements and scored for mezzo-soprano, tenor, mixed choir and piano. The first movement, "In a teeming multitude" (Russian: Мы многолюдною толпою…), is named Chorus (Хор), marked "Allegro" and set for choir. It has been described as a "jubilant" opening and a very Russian chorus of gratitude.

The second movement, "At this peaceful cradle" (Russian: У этой тихой колыбели…), is named Berceuse (Колыбельная), marked "Allegretto" and sung by the mezzo-soprano.

The third movement, "His childhood years passed" (Russian: Прошли младенческие годы…), is named again Chorus, marked "Moderato", set for mezzo-soprano and choir.

The fourth movement, "From the cares of the dreary world" (Russian: От забот земли унылой…), is named Aria (Ария), for the solo tenor, marked "Andante", an "aria of praise".

The last movement, "Ever glorious and without compare" (Russian: Вечно, славный без сравненья…), is named Hymn (Гимн) and marked "Moderato assai", set for all voices. It has been regarded as "a hymn, in which the two soloists join, exultantly taken up by the chorus, with a burst of joy at the close".

== Recording ==
The cantata was recorded in August 2002 in an orchestral version at the Grand Hall of the Moscow Conservatory. It was performed by soloists Ludmila Kuznetsova and Vsevolod Grivnov, the Russian State Symphony Orchestra and Capella, conducted by Valeri Polyansky. The cantata was combined with the composer's Eighth Symphony (1906) and the Poème Lyrique in D-flat major, Op. 12 (1887). The CD was made part of a collection covering Glazunov's eight symphonies and other major works on seven CDs in 2008.

A review notes that the music was "full of warmly lyrical ideas, with Glazunov’s inspired flow of invention more than compensating for the doggerel poetry he was forced to set by the 'unrefusable' Grand Duke".
