= Symphony No. 6 (Glazunov) =

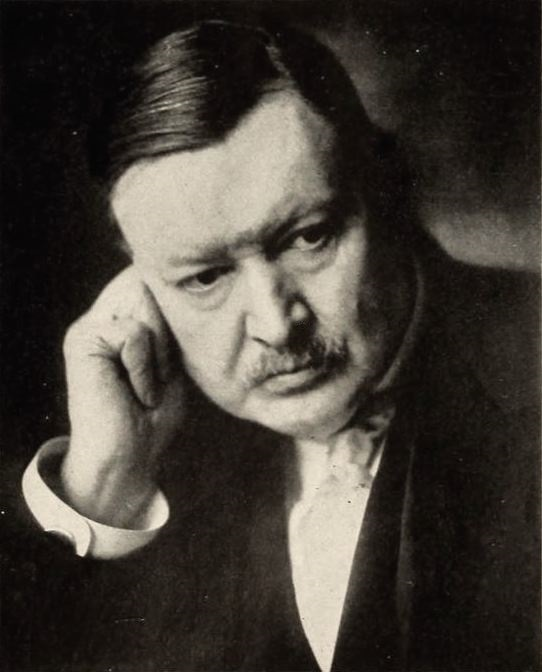

The Symphony No. 6 in C minor, Op. 58, was composed by Alexander Glazunov in 1896, and was published two years later. It is dedicated to Sigismond Blumenfeld, brother of the composer Felix Blumenfeld.

It is in four movements:

1. Adagio ( = 66) – Allegro passionato ( = 66)
2. Tema con variazioni: Andante ( = 66)
3. Intermezzo (Scherzo allegretto) ( = 138)
4. Finale: Andante maestoso ( = 60) – Moderato ( = 92)

== Instrumentation ==
The symphony is scored for the following orchestra: 3 flutes (3rd doubling piccolo), 2 oboes, 3 clarinets, 2 bassoons, 4 horns, 3 trumpets, 3 trombones, tuba, timpani, triangle, cymbals, bass drum, and strings.
