= Symphony No. 29 (Haydn) =

1765 symphony by Joseph Haydn

Joseph Haydn

Joseph Haydn's Symphony No. 29 in E major, Hoboken I/29, was written in 1765, just after his 28th, and to be performed in Eisenstadt, under the benign auspices of Prince Nikolaus Esterházy.

The work is scored for two oboes, bassoon, two horns, and strings with continuo.

The work is in four movements:

1. Allegro di molto, 3/4
2. Andante, 2/4 in A major
3. Menuetto e Trio (Trio in E minor), 3/4
4. Presto, 4/4

In the slow movement, the melody is passed back and forth between the first and second violin parts.

The trio of the Minuet has an "oompah accompaniment in the strings" and horns sustaining Es in octaves, but apparently no melody. The harpsichordist would have to provide a melody, but "no keyboard player has dared to provide such a thing for a quarter of a century" between Loibner's recording and the writing of Hodgson's book. H. C. Robbins Landon also notes the "weird atmosphere" and lack of melody, but says it has a "sombre and secretive beauty" and has a "strongly Balkan" character due to an E minor to B minor modulation.

== Discography ==
In the LP era, neither Antal Doráti with the Philharmonia Hungarica nor Leslie Jones with the Little Orchestra of London provide a tune for the trio of the Minuet. Loibner has the Vienna Academy Chamber Orchestra's harpsichordist Christa Fuhrmann give "the outline of a melody—a convincing example of improvisation which suits the music well."

Moving on to the CD era, on Naxos Records, Nicholas Ward and the Northern Chamber Orchestra pair No. 29 with Nos. 22 and 60. Ward's recording has no tune in the trio of the minuet. Neither has that of Adam Fischer conducting the Austro-Hungarian Haydn Orchestra in Haydn's complete symphonies. The recording by Christopher Hogwood conducting the Academy of Ancient Music also omits a harpsichord melody in the third movement.
