= Symphony No. 1 (Scriabin) =

Symphony written by Alexander Scriabin

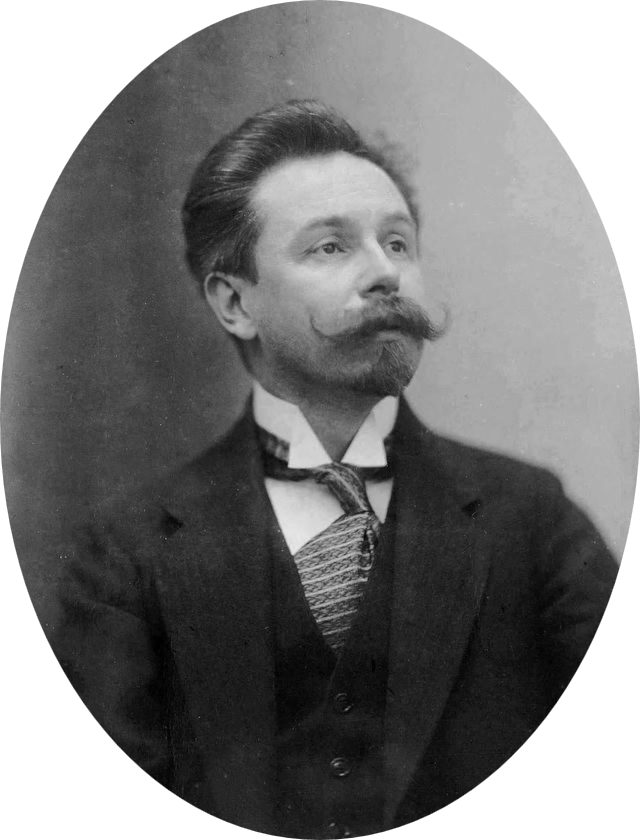
Alexander Scriabin in 1900 Portrait

Alexander Scriabin's Symphony No. 1, Op. 26, in E major was written in 1899 and 1900. It consists of six movements, the last of which has a chorus and two vocal soloists. This work is one of the first in which Scriabin's idea of art morally transforming a person is shown.

== Background ==
The composer began formulating the symphony in 1899. In January 1900, he tried it out at the piano in Moscow with his friend Aleksandr Goldenweiser. In this version for two pianos, the work was played to various musicians, including Lyadov (who later that year conducted the premiere of the symphony, minus the last movement). Scriabin wrote the bulk of the work in the summer of 1900, working on it in the Moscow district of Daryino. In June 1900 he wrote to the publisher Belyayev that he was "very busy composing for orchestra", and three months later in September, he reported, "During the summer I wrote a symphony (6 movements) and am now orchestrating it."

Scriabin first showed his symphony to his teacher Vasily Safonov at the piano, then to Lyadov when he came to St. Petersburg. Scriabin had prevaricated over the definitive text of the choral finale, which he himself had written, but the artistic committee which presided over the acceptance of works to be published by the publishing house (headed by Rimsky-Korsakov, Glazunov and Lyadov) declared, "the vocal part in the sixth movement of your symphony is unperformable, and in such a form this movement of the symphony cannot be published."

Despite Scriabin's protestations, when Lyadov conducted the work's premiere on 24 November 1900 (11 November, Old Style), the finale was omitted.

Scriabin nonetheless was awarded the Glinka Award (later renamed the Glinka Prize) in November 1900 for this work.

It was to be another five months before the symphony was heard in its entirety: the symphony had its first complete performance in Moscow on 29 March 1901 (16 March, Old Style) under the direction of Safonov, in a concert dedicated to the memory of Nikolai Rubinstein.

Fifteen years later the critic Arthur Eaglefield Hull wrote that the First Symphony was "a masterly work of great beauty".

== Instrumentation ==
The symphony is scored for mezzo-soprano, tenor, mixed chorus (SATB), and an orchestra consisting of 3 flutes (3rd also piccolo), 2 oboes, 3 clarinets, 2 bassoons, 4 horns, 3 trumpets, 3 trombones, tuba, timpani, bells, harp, and strings.

== Movements ==
1. Lento
2. Allegro drammatico
3. Lento
4. Vivace
5. Allegro
6. Andante

=== Finale ===
The finale is a paean to the sovereignty of Art, a theme common in Scriabin's works. The words were written by Scriabin himself. The mezzo-soprano begins the movement with "O highest symbol of divinity, supreme art and harmony, we bring praise as tribute before you", and the piece concludes with mezzo-soprano, tenor and—finally—the chorus singing "Ruling omnipotently over the earth, you lift man up to do glorious deeds. Come all peoples everywhere to Art. Let us sing its praises."

The full translation of the text of the final movement is roughly as follows:

O wonderful image of the Divine,
Harmony's pure Art!
To you we gladly bring
Praise of that rapturous feeling.
You are life’s bright hope,
You are celebration, you are respite,
Like a gift you bring to the people
Your enchanted visions.
In that gloomy and cold hour,
When the soul is full of tumult,
Man finds in you
The spry joy of consolation.
Strength, fallen in battle, you
Miraculously call to life,
In the exhausted and afflicted mind
You breed thoughts of a new order.
An endless ocean of emotion you
Breed in the enraptured heart,
And sings the best songs of songs,
Your high priest, by you enlivened.
On Earth gloriously reigns
Your spirit, free and mighty,
Man lifted by you
Gloriously conducts the greatest feat.
Come, all peoples of the world,
Let us sing the praises of Art!
Glory to Art,
Glory forever!
