= Symphony No. 8 (Glazunov) =

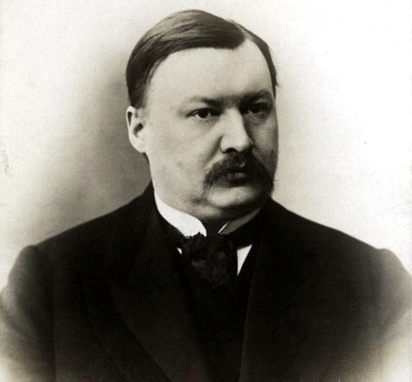
Alexander Glazunov before 1913

The Symphony No. 8 in E♭ major, Op. 83, was composed by Alexander Glazunov in 1905, and was published two years later. This four-movement symphony (his last one) was premiered on December 22, 1906 in Saint Petersburg, the composer conducting. It was an important influence on Igor Stravinsky's Symphony in E♭.

It is in four movements:

1. Allegro moderato ( = 100)
2. Mesto ( = 50–54)
3. Allegro ( = 120)
4. Finale: Moderato sostenuto ( = 66)
