= Tcherepnin =

Tcherepnin (Russian: Черепнин) is a surname. It may refer to any of the following composers:

- Nikolai Tcherepnin (1873–1945), Russian composer
  - Alexander Tcherepnin (1899–1977), Russian composer, son of Nikolai
    - Serge Tcherepnin (b. 1941), composer, son of Alexander
    - Ivan Tcherepnin (1943–1998), composer, son of Alexander
