= List of compositions by Alexander Tcherepnin =

This is a list of the compositions by Alexander Tcherepnin. His oeuvre includes ballets, quartets, trios, piano works, and vocal repertoire, among many other genres and forms. Most of his works use the standard opus number system, however there are many which have not been assigned an opus number.

Opus No.	Year	Title	Instrument	Performers
001	1921	Toccata No. 1	Piano	
002	1919	Nocturne No. 1 Danse No. 1	Piano	
003	1917	Scherzo	Piano	
004	1918	Sonatine romantique	Piano	
005	1912–18 1958	Bagatelles (10 pieces)	Piano	
042	1927	Symphony No. 1	Orchestra	
077	1946–51	Symphony No. 2	Orchestra	Chicago Symphony Orchestra (Rafael Kubelík)
083	1951	Symphony No. 3	Orchestra	
091	1957	Symphony No. 4	Orchestra	
034	1925	Trio	Violin, cello and piano	
022	1922	Rhapsody georgienne	Cello and Orchestra	
037	1925	Mystère	Cello and Chamber Orchestra	
006	1918–19	Petite Suite	Piano	
090	1955–57	Divertimento	Orchestra	Chicago Symphony Orchestra (Fritz Reiner)
041	1926–27	Magna Mater	Orchestra and Choir	
045	1928	Die Hochzeit der Sobeide (opera)		
055	1937	Trepak (ballet)		
087b	1949	Le Gouffre (ballet)		
035	1930	Ol-Ol (opera)		
033	1924	Concerto da Camera	Flute, violin and chamber orchestra	
093	1959	Symphonisches Gebet (Symphonic Prayer)		
040	1911	Narcissus and Echo (ballet)		Ballets Russes (Sergei Diaghilev)
095	1962	Chinese Songs (Tcherepnin)	Baritone and Piano	Yi-Kwei Sze
027	1924	Slavic Transcriptions: 1. Les Bateliers du Volga (The Volga Boatmen); 2. Chanson pour la cherie (Song for the Beloved); 3. Chanson: Grandrussienne (The Great Russian People) (later title: Russian Song); 4. Le Long du Volga (The Banks of the Volga); 5. Chanson tchèque (Czech Song)	Orchestra	
096	1963	Piano Concerto No. 5	Piano and Orchestra	
096	1963	Piano Concerto No. 5 (arrangement)	Two pianos	
082	1953	Songs Without Words: 1. Elegy; 2. Rondel; 3. Enigma; 4. The Juggler; 5. Hymn to Our Lady	Piano	
066	1940	Chant et Refrain	Piano	
075	1946	Le Mond En Vitrine: 1. The Greyhounds and the Cow; 2. Crabs; 3. The Frog; 4. The Weasel; 5. The Deer	Piano	
N.A.	1940	La Foire de Sorotchinski (ballet), composed by Modest Mussorgsky and completed/orchestrated by Alexander Tcherepin		
079	1948	La Femme et son ombre (ballet)		
070	1944	Mouvement perpetuel	Violin and piano	
032	1923	Ajanta's Frescoes (ballet)		Anna Pavlova
063	1939	Sonata sportiva	Alto saxophone or bassoon and piano	
104	1967	Four Russian Folksongs: 1. Hills; 2. Shali-Vali; 3. Complaint; 4. Nonsense Song	A capella mixed chorus	
088	1954–55	8 Pieces for Piano: 1. Meditation; 2. Intermezzo; 3. Reverie; 4. Impromptu; 5. Invocation; 6. The Chase; 7. Etude; 8. Burlesque	Piano	
013	1920–21	Nine Inventions	Piano	
021	1922–23	6 Études de travail	Piano	
051	1934–35	Étude du piano sur la gamme pentatonique: 1. Première suite (1934); 2. Deuxième suite (1934); 3. Bagatelles chinoises (Chinese Bagatelles) (1935)	Piano	First recorded by Giorgio Koukl (2010)
052		Five Etudes: 1. Shadow Play; 2. The Lute; 3. Hommage to China; 4. Punch and Judy; 5. Cantique	Piano	
069	1944	Evocation (Enfance do Saint-Nino)		
079	1948	La Femme et Son Ombre (ballet)		
105	1970	Brass Quintent		
017	1918–20	Haltes (Stops)	Soprano or Tenor and piano	
050	1933	Dances Russes		
058	1939	Sonatina: Timpani and orchestra (1954); Timpani and band (1963)	Timpani and piano	
089	1954	The Lost Flute	Narrator and orchestra	
100	1960	Suite	Harpischord	
037	1921–25	Three Pieces for Chamber Orchestra: 1. Overture; 2. Mystère; 3. Pour un entrainment de boxe (For a Boxer's Training)	Chamber orchestra	
098	1964	Of Things Light and Earnest (cantata)	Contralto or bass and string orchestra	
023	1922	Four Nostalgic Preludes	Piano	
074	1945	Nativity Play (cantata)	Two sopranos, tenor, bass, chorus (optional), string orchestra and percussion	
073	1945	Les Douze	Narrator and small orchestra (or piano)	
086	1953	Concerto	Harmonica and Orchestra	
103	1967	Six Liturgical Chants: 1. Cherubim song 2. O My God; 3. Light So Tender; 4. Prayer to the Holy Spirit; 5. Transfiguration; 6. Alleluia	A Capella mixed chorus	
107	1976	Woodwind Quintet		
105	1970	Brass quintet		
064	1950	Andante for Tuba or Trombone and Piano	Tuba or trombone with Piano	
–	1920	Étude de concert	Piano	First recorded by Giorgio Koukl (2010)
–	1915	Sunny Day ‘Forgotten Bagatelle’	Piano	
–	1975	Four Caprice Diatoniques	Harp or Celtic harp	
–	1962	Processional and Recessional	Organ	
–	1927	Study	Soprano or tenor and piano	
–	1942	L’écolier Paresseux	Voice and piano	
–	1963	"Attack on Singapore"	Soundtrack	

== See also ==
- Alexander Tcherepnin
