= Sorochyntsi Fair =

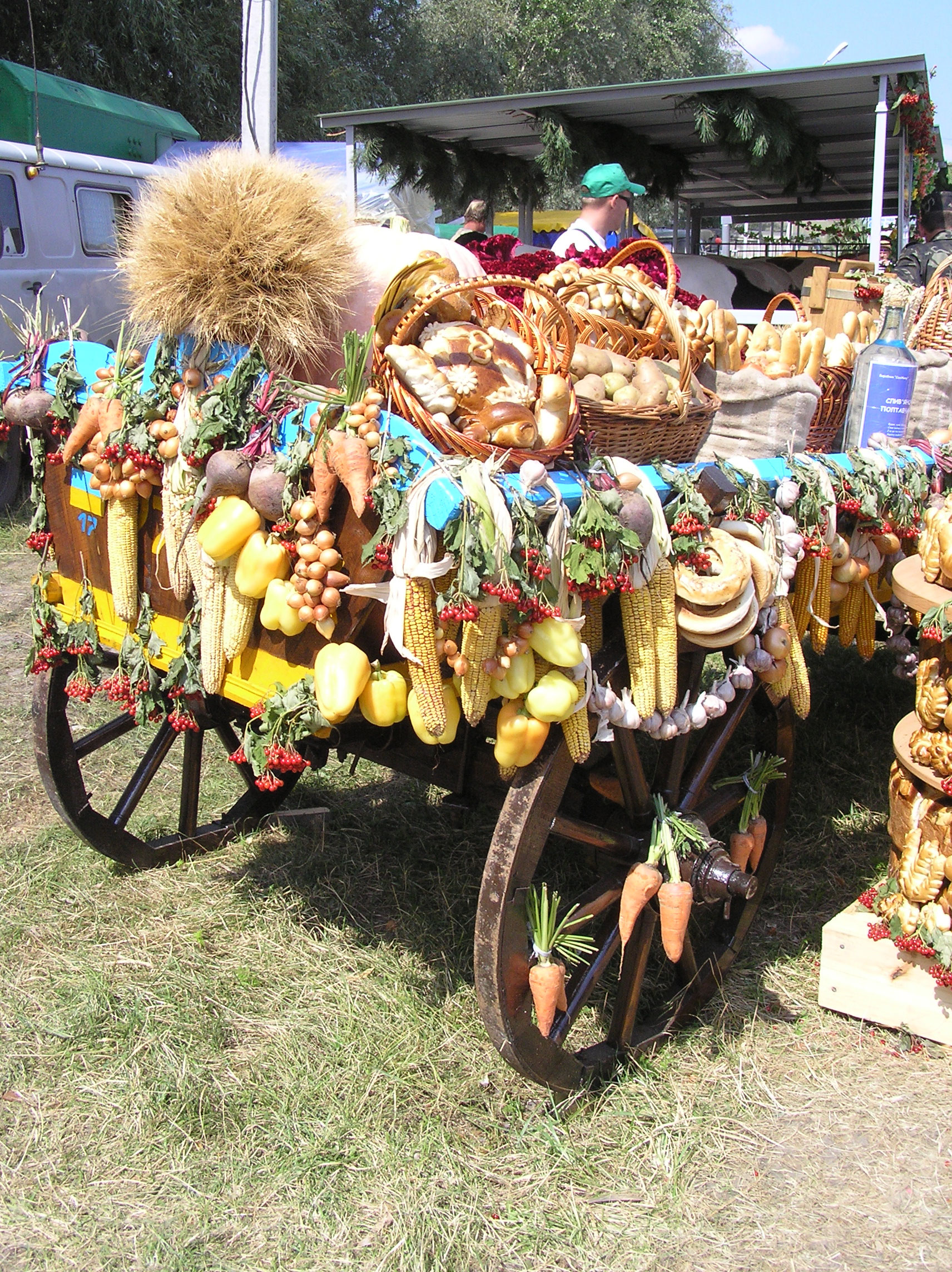
Sorochyntsi Fair, 2007

The Sorochyntsi Fair or Sorochynsky Fair (Ukrainian: Національний Сорочинський ярмарок, romanized: Nacional'nyj Soročyns'kyj jarmarok, Russian: Сорочинcкaя яpмaркa, romanized: Sorochinskaya yarmarka) is a large fair held in the village of Velyki Sorochyntsi near Poltava in the Myrhorod Raion (district) of Ukraine.

It was held five times a year during the Russian Empire, then went into a 40-year moratorium during Soviet rule. It has been held annually since its revival after Ukraine became independent in 1991, except 2020.

Following a Presidential Decree of August 18, 1999, the fair holds the status of Ukraine's national trade fair.

The fair is a large showcase for traditional handicrafts made by skilled craftsmen, including Reshetylivka embroidery, rugs, Opishnia ceramics, as well theatrical performers who re-enact scenes of village life from famous Ukrainian stories. In August 2007, the fair was opened by Ukrainian President Viktor Yushchenko.

The historic Sorochyntsi Fair features in a number of Ukrainian and Russian works of literature and music, including "The Fair at Sorochyntsi", a short story by Nikolai Gogol, and The Fair at Sorochyntsi, an opera by Modest Mussorgsky.
