= The Fair at Sorochyntsi =

Opera by Modest Mussorgsky

- Comic opera by Modest Mussorgsky
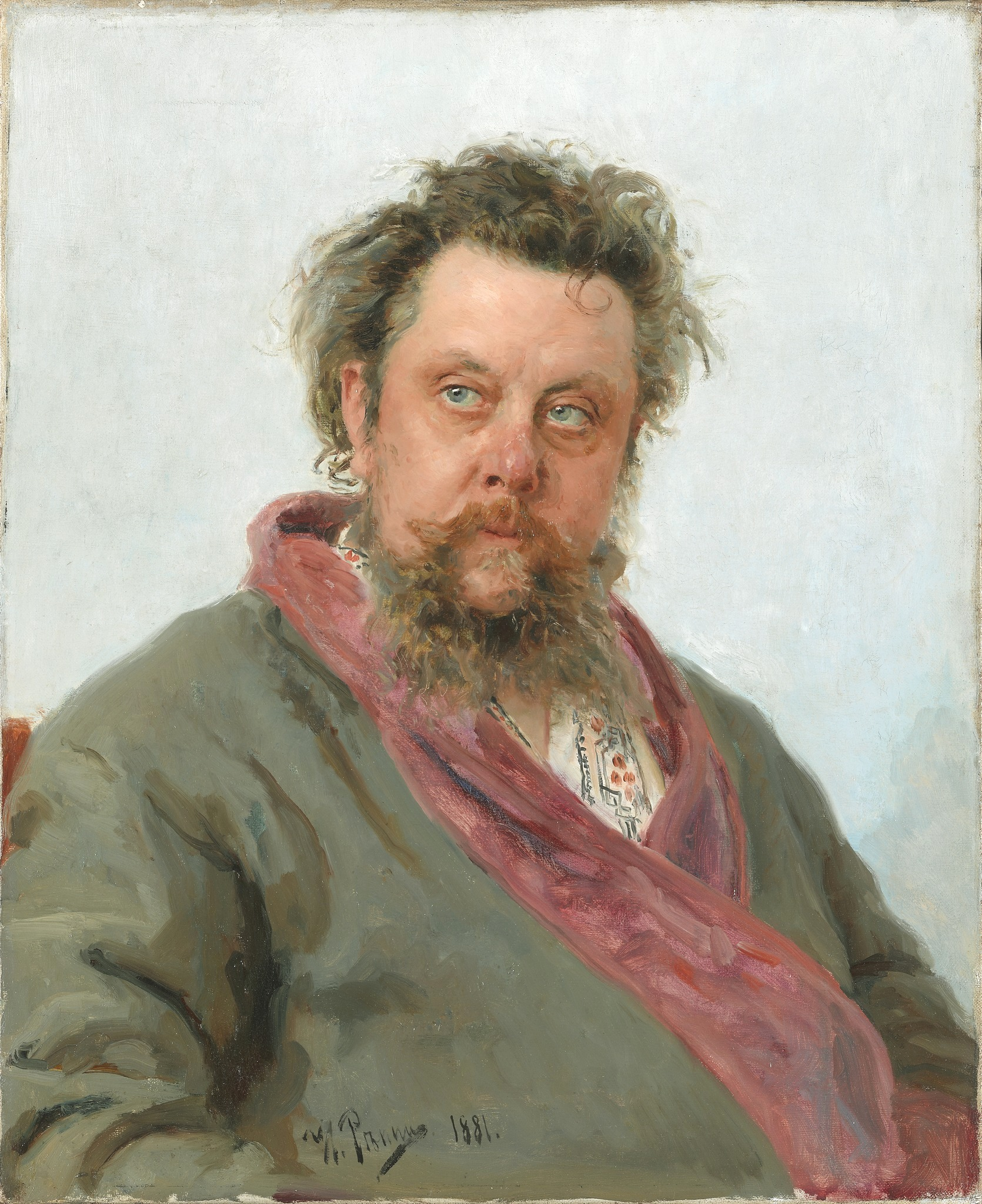
- Mussorgsky, 1881 portrait by Ilia Repin
- Native title: Russian: Сорочинская ярмарка
- Librettist: Mussorgsky
- Language: Russian
- Based on: The Fair at Sorochyntsi by Gogol
- Premiere: 13 October 1917; Petrograd's Theatre

The Fair at Sorochyntsi (Russian: Сорочинская ярмарка, Sorochinskaya yarmarka, Sorochyntsi Fair) is a comic opera in three acts by Modest Mussorgsky, composed between 1874 and 1880 in St. Petersburg, Russia. The composer wrote the libretto, which is based on Nikolai Gogol's short story of the same name, from his early (1832) collection of stories Evenings on a Farm near Dikanka. The opera remained unfinished and unperformed at Mussorgsky's death in 1881. Today, the completion by Vissarion Shebalin has become the standard.

== Composition history ==
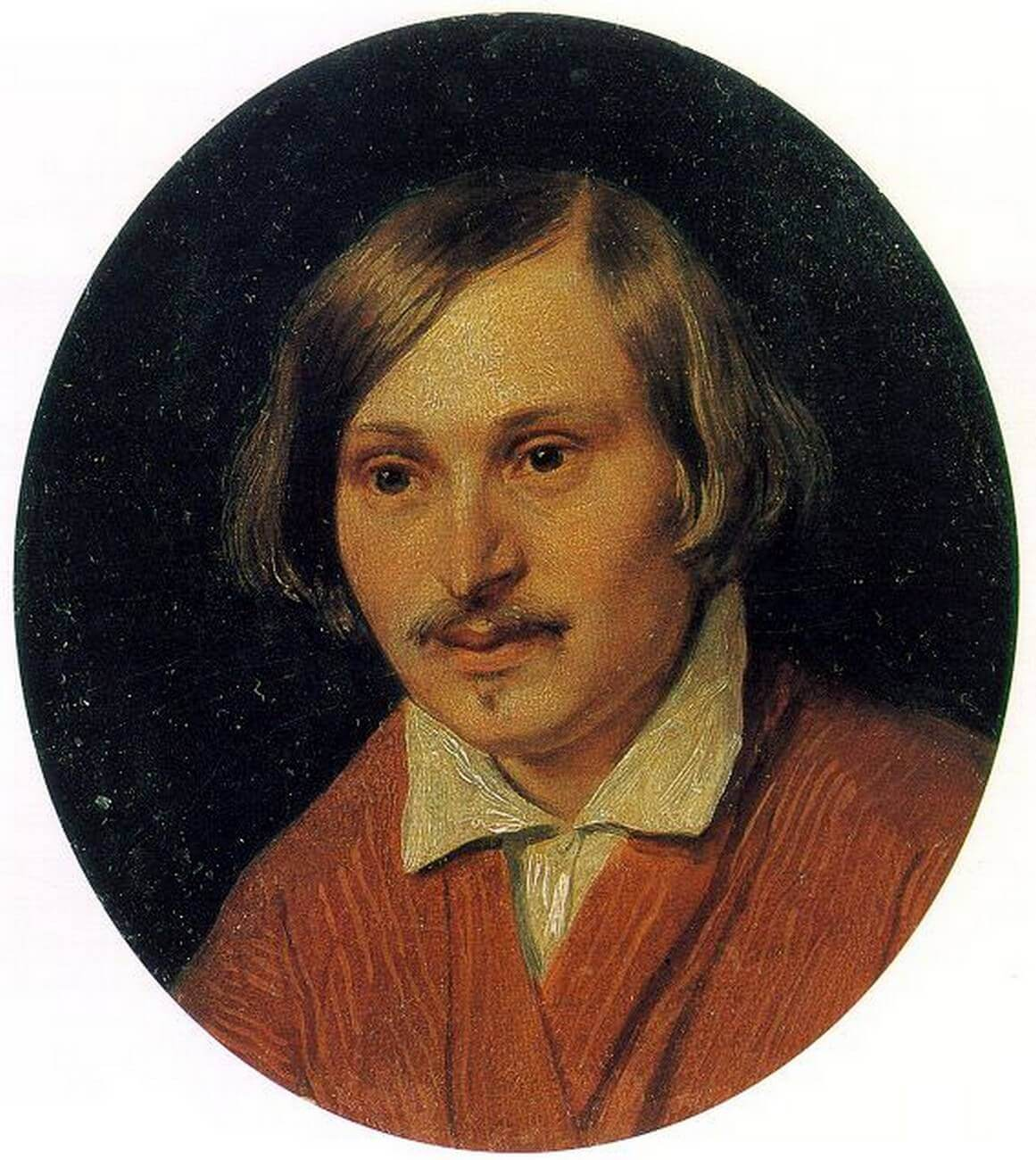
Nikolay Gogol (1809–1852)

Mussorgsky worked on the opera between 1874 and 1880, in competition with his work on Khovanshchina (1872–1880); both were incomplete at the time of his death in 1881. He reused some music that he had written previously (such as the "Market Scene" from Act II of the ill-fated Mlada of 1872, rewritten for the opening scene of Fair). Incorporation of the music of Night on Bald Mountain as a dream sequence involving the hero was a late addition to the scenario in the course of composition, despite the fact that such an episode is not suggested by the original story. Although Mussorgsky managed to complete some numbers and even some of the orchestration (the whole prelude and the Andantino of Parasya's Dumka), significant portions of the scenario were left only in bare sketches, or without any music at all.

Several subsequent composers and editors (cited below) played partial or maximal roles in bringing the work into a performable state. The first staged performance, with spoken sections, occurred on 8 October 1913 in Moscow under Konstantin Saradzhev. Beginning in 1917, the first of several fully-sung versions reached the stage.

== Performance history ==
Completed versions of the opera took place as follows:

- César Cui version: 13 October 1917 in Petrograd's Theatre of Musical Drama under Grzegorz Fitelberg.
- Nikolai Tcherepnin version: 17 March 1923 in Monte Carlo with Tcherepnin conducting
- Nikolai Golovanov version: 10 January 1925 in Moscow's Bolshoi Theatre with Yuri Sakhnovsky conducting.
- Vissarion Shebalin version: 12 December 1931 in Leningrad at the Maly Opera Theatre conducted by Samuil Samosud.
- Emil Cooper's version: on 3 November 1942 in New York

The opera was first performed in England on 24 November 1936 by the British Music Drama Opera Company at Covent Garden, staged by Vladimir Rosing, with Albert Coates conducting.

The Fair at Sorochyntsi is not a part of the standard operatic repertoire in the West. The best-known numbers from Fair are the orchestral Introduction and the closing Gopak. Mussorgsky also arranged the Gopak and the market scene for piano solo.

Sergei Rachmaninoff made an arrangement of the Gopak for piano.

Rimsky-Korsakov's version of Night on Bald Mountain is based mainly on the version included in this opera.

Two of the Ukrainian folk tunes that Mussorgsky incorporated into this opera (Act 1) were used also by Rimsky-Korsakov in his own Christmas Eve, which was likewise based on a story by Gogol.

== Roles ==
Role	Voice type	Premiere Cast, 8 October 1913 Conductor: Konstantin Saradzhev)
Cherevik	bass	
Khivrya, Cherevik’s wife	mezzo-soprano	
Parasya, Cherevik’s daughter, Khivrya’s stepdaughter	soprano	
Kum	bass-baritone	
Gritsko, a peasant lad	tenor	
Afanasiy Ivanovich, a priest’s son	tenor	
The gypsy	bass	
Chorus, silent roles: Market-women, merchants, Gypsies, Jews, Cossacks, lads, lasses, guests
Intermezzo (Shebalin edition)
Chornobog	bass	
Chorus, silent roles: Kashchéy, Cherv' (Worm), Chumá (Plague), Topelets, Smert' (Death), demons, witches, dwarfs

Note: The Shebalin edition incorporates the Dream Vision of the Peasant Lad (Russian: Сонное видение паробка).

== Synopsis ==
Time: Beginning of the 19th century
Place: The village of Velikiye Sorochyntsi, near Poltava

Scenes where Mussorgsky did not compose the music are bracketed and marked in italics. The ordering of scenes follows Shebalin's completion.

The opera begins with an overture suggestive of early morning. This is usually accompanied visually by a scene depicting the fair stalls being set up and visitors arriving.

=== Act 1 ===
Merchants peddle their wares to crowds of visitors arriving from all around. The Gypsy makes reference to a red jacket that the devil is looking for, while the lad Gritsko woos Parasya. Her father, Cherevik, at first is indignant at this forwardness, but, after realizing that Gritsko is the son of a close friend, he agrees to let Gritsko marry his daughter. The two men go into the tavern to celebrate, as evening settles and the people disperse.

Cherevik and his buddy, Kum, come out of the tavern in a drunken state. After they wander around in the dark, [Khrivya, Cherevik's wife, comes out of their house, and he announces Parasya's engagement. But Khivrya objects, and, while Gritsko overhears, drunken Cherevik concedes that the wedding will not happen.] Gritsko, alone, bemoans his sadness. [The Gypsy enters, and the two make a pact: Gritsko will give the Gypsy his oxen for fifteen rubles if the latter can make Cherevik change his mind.]

=== Act 2 ===
Kum's Hut

Inside Kum's house, where they are lodging, Khivrya quarrels with Cherevik, getting him to leave, so that she may keep her secret rendezvous with Afanasy Ivanovich, the son of the village priest. When the latter arrives, she offers him her culinary delicacies, which he devours. In the midst of their amorous encounter a knock is heard at the door. Afanasy hides on a shelf, and in walk Cherevik and Kum, with friends, alarmed by a rumor that someone has seen the red jacket and the devil. Kum tells the full story of the red jacket, [concluding with the remark that the devil appears every year at the fair with a pig's face, looking for the red jacket. Suddenly a pig's snout is seen in the window, and everyone runs about in confusion.]

=== Act 3 ===
Scene 1: The Street before Kum's Hut

[On a street, as a result of the superstitious confusion of the previous scene, Cherevik and Kum are being chased by the Gypsy and some lads. The latter accuse the two older men of stealing a mare, and tie them up. Gritsko enters, extracting a promise from Cherevik to have the wedding to Parasya the next day, and the two older men are released.]

Alone, Gritsko falls asleep and has a dream involving witches and devils. They are dispelled by church bells.

Scene 2: The Street before Kum's Hut

On a street in front of Kum's house, Parasya at first is sad about Gritsko, but then cheers herself up with a little hopak, in which Cherevik joins without her noticing. [Kum and Gritsko enter, and Cherevik blesses the two lovers, only to be met by Khivrya's rage, which prompts the Gypsy to call on the lads to restrain her.] The people celebrate the wedding with a hopak.

== Principal arias and numbers ==
- Introduction: "A Hot Day in Little Russia" (Orchestra)
- Aria: Parobok's Dumka (Gritsko)
- Aria: Parasya's Dumka (Parasya)
- Finale: Hopak (Chorus)

== Versions by other hands ==
In 1881 Nikolai Rimsky-Korsakov suggested that Anatoly Lyadov finish the composition of the work, the libretto to be completed by Mussorgsky's old friend Arseny Golenishchev-Kutuzov. However, Lyadov orchestrated only five numbers (published in 1904) and did not finish the opera. Vyacheslav Karatygin later edited some fragments of Mussorgsky's manuscripts, which were orchestrated by Lyadov and performed in 1911. The next year Vladimir Senilov published his orchestration of Parasya's dumka from Act III. Yury Sakhnovsky edited and orchestrated some fragments which, together with material edited by Lyadov, Karatygin, and Rimsky-Korsakov (i.e., the Night on Bald Mountain music) constituted a staged "premiere" of sorts, performed at the Moscow Free Theatre on 8 October 1913 (Old Style), with spoken dialogue inserted for scenes without music by Mussorgsky.

In commemoration of his late comrade from The Five, César Cui became the first to create a complete version of The Fair at Sorochyntsi during 1914–1916. This fully sung version – but without the Night on Bald Mountain sequence – was staged on 13 October 1917 (Old Style) at the Theatre of Musical Drama in Petrograd. The foreword to Cui's edition, dated October 1916, explains the state of affairs at the time, and translates thus:

The comic opera Sorochyntsi Fair was begun by Mussorgsky in 1875 [sic], was composed slowly and in fragments, and after the composer's death in 1881 remained unfinished. Originally only five excerpts were published: the Introduction to the opera (adapted according to the preliminary draft by A.K. Lyadov), the Lad's Dumka (ed. by Lyadov), the Gopak, the Scene of Khivrya expecting Afanasiy Ivanovich, and Parasya's Dumka (the orchestral edition of all five numbers belongs to Lyadov). Mussorgsky's manuscripts nevertheless still afforded a substantial quantity of musical material, namely, the "scene of the fair" which begins the opera and the first half of the second act. This material was adapted by V.G. Karatygin, supplemented and orchestrated by C.A. Cui. Nevertheless the remainder, in particular the scene of Cherevik and Khivrya and the scene of the Lad and the Gypsy in Act 1, 2nd half, and all of the third [act], with the exception of Parasya's Dumka and the Gopak, is added and orchestrated by C.A. Cui, and consequently Mussorgsky's posthumous labor is completed.

However, Cui's version failed to find a permanent place in the repertory, and the opera was completed and orchestrated again by Nikolai Tcherepnin in 1923 and by Vissarion Shebalin in 1930. Shebalin's version became the standard since then. This also includes the Night on Bald Mountain between the two scenes of the third act, instead of as an interlude in act one (following Gritsko's Dumka), as Mussorgsky originally planned.

== Recordings ==
Year	Cast: (Cherevik, Khivrya, Parasya, Gritsko, Afanasiy Ivanovich)	Conductor and Orchestra	Version	Label
1955	Latko Koroshetz; Bogdana Stritar; Vilma Bukovetz; Miro Branjnik; Slavko Shtrukel	Samo Hubad; Slovenian National Opera	Shebalin	LP: Philips, Cat: A 00329-00330 L
1975	Gennadiy Troytsky; Antonina Kleshchova; Lyudmila Belobragina; Aleksey Usmanov; Yuriy Yelnikov	Yuri Ahronovitch; Moscow Radio Symphony Orchestra and Chorus	Shebalin	LP: Melodiya, Cat: D 026823-28; CD: Melodiya-Eurodisc, Cat: GD 69126
1983	Vladimir Matorin; L. Zhakharenko; Lidiya Chernikh; Anatoliy Mishchevsky; Vyacheslav Voynarovsky	Vladimir Esipov; Stanislavsky Theater Orchestra and Chorus	Shebalin	LP: Melodiya, Cat: C10 20721 007; CD: Olympia, Cat: OCD 114 A/B
1996	Hermann Kuklin; Svetlana Zalizniak; Nadezhda Ryzhkova; Vitaly Petrov; Sergei Maistruk	Yevgeniy Brazhnik; Yekaterinburg State Academic Opera Theatre Orchestra and Chorus	Shebalin	URAL
