= Giorgio Koukl =

Czech-Swiss pianist, composer and music journalist (born 1953)

- Born: Jiří Koukl; 23 March 1953 (age 73); Prague, Czechoslovakia
- Occupations: Pianist; composer; music journalist
- Years active: 1970s–present
- Style: Classical
- Website: koukl.com

Giorgio Koukl (born Jiří Koukl; born 23 March 1953) is a Czech-Swiss pianist, composer and music journalist. He resides in Lugano, Switzerland.

== Life and career ==
Koukl was born in 1953 in Prague, Czechoslovakia. His family history traces back to the Belarusian noble family of Grigori Minaiev.

Through studies with Rudolf Firkušný, Nikita Magaloff, Stanislav Neuhaus and Carlo Vidusso, Koukl was first introduced to the piano music of Bohuslav Martinů. Koukl is considered one of the major world specialists of Parisian music of the 1920s and of the "silver age" composers from Saint Petersburg. He has recorded the only one existing complete set of solo piano music of Martinů, released between November 2006 and August 2009 – a 5-CD set of complete vocal music of Martinů and a 2-CD set of Martinů's complete piano and orchestra works.

A series of eight CDs of the complete solo piano music of Alexander Tcherepnin added to his discography, rated best CD of the month (four times) and best CD of the year (2 times), as well as the recordings of Vítězslava Kaprálová, Paul Le Flem (French prize Diapason d'Or), Witold Lutosławski (First World Recordings), Arthur Lourié (First World Recordings), Tibor Harsányi, (a project completed in January 2021; First World Recording), Carl Maria von Weber, Johannes Brahms, Alexandre Tansman, and the complete piano and two-piano works of Vittorio Rieti. He also recorded Claude Delvincourt's complete piano works, released on Brilliant Classics.

Koukl is an honorary member of the International Martinů society.
