= Jean Derbès =

French composer (1937–1982)

Jean Derbès (19 May 1937 – 14 May 1982) was a French composer, music critic, radio producer, and pianist.

== Life and career ==
The son of a violinist employed at the Opéra de Lyon, Jean Derbès was born in Aix-les-Bains, France on 19 May 1937. He studied piano with Hélène Herrenschmidt at the Conservatoire à rayonnement régional de Lyon while a teenager. This was followed by further studies with Nikita Magaloff and Madeleine Lipatti at the Geneva Conservatoire where he earned a first prize in 1955. After this he entered the Conservatoire de Paris where he was a piano student of Yves Nat and Walter Gieseking, and a music composition pupil of Noël Gallon and Tony Aubin. While in Paris he was active as a jazz and contemporary music performer.

Derbès returned to Geneva where we worked as a music critic for Journal de Genève and a producer at Radio Suisse Romande. In 1961 he won second prize in the piano division of the Geneva International Music Competition. In Geneva he became interested in electro-acoustic music, and became active in that medium; particularly in creating works for the traditional symphony which incorporated electro-acoustic instrumentation and other elements. In 1964 he married contralto Arlette Chédel; a singer with whom he frequently collaborated. In 1968 he won first prize at the Geneva Concours for his ballet Manu-Tara (1967).

He also wrote two pieces for the organ: Des yeux de cet archange... (1971) and Livre d'Orgue (1975, for organ and chorus).

Derbès died in Geneva, Switzerland on 14 May 1982 at the age of 45.
