= Nikita Magaloff =

Georgian-Russian pianist (1912–1992)

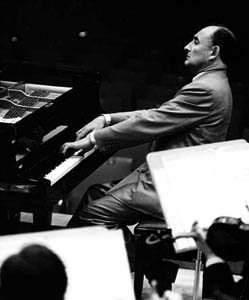
1965

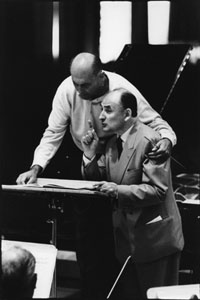
Magaloff and Georg Solti (1965)

Nikita Magaloff (Russian: Никита Магалов; 21 February [O.S. 8 February] 1912 – 26 December 1992) was a Georgian-Russian pianist.

He was born in Saint Petersburg to a Georgian noble family named Maghalashvili. Magaloff and his family left Russia in 1918 for Finland. His musical interest first stimulated by family friend Serge Prokofiev, he studied with Alexander Siloti before going to Paris, where he studied with Isidor Philipp, chair of the piano department at the Paris Conservatory. He numbered Ravel among his friends there, who, when he graduated in 1929, said 'In Magaloff a great, a truly extraordinary musician is born.'

He was best known for his espousal of the music of Chopin and was accustomed to perform the complete piano works in series of six recitals. He was the first to record Chopin's complete works. His recordings were innovative for their textual fidelity and unsentimentality. Magaloff, for example, preferred and recorded Chopin's own manuscript versions of the waltzes rather than the familiar versions published posthumously by Julian Fontana.

Nikita Magaloff 1954 dedicated photo from tour of Southern Africa organised by Hans Adler.

In 1949 he took over his friend and colleague Dinu Lipatti's master class at the Geneva Conservatory after Lipatti became too ill to teach (Lipatti died the following year at age 33). Magaloff continued regular teaching until 1960, when the demands of his concert career took priority, and he toured in the United States, South America, Japan, Israel, South Africa, and throughout Europe including Russia and Scandinavia. He still gave occasional master-classes, and took part in juries at international piano competitions. In 1980, he was vice-chair on the jury of the International Chopin Piano Competition in Warsaw. In 1982 and 1987 he served on the jury of the Paloma O'Shea Santander International Piano Competition. He was also the president of the jury of the Clara Haskil piano competition in Switzerland for seven consecutive editions, between 1977 and 1989

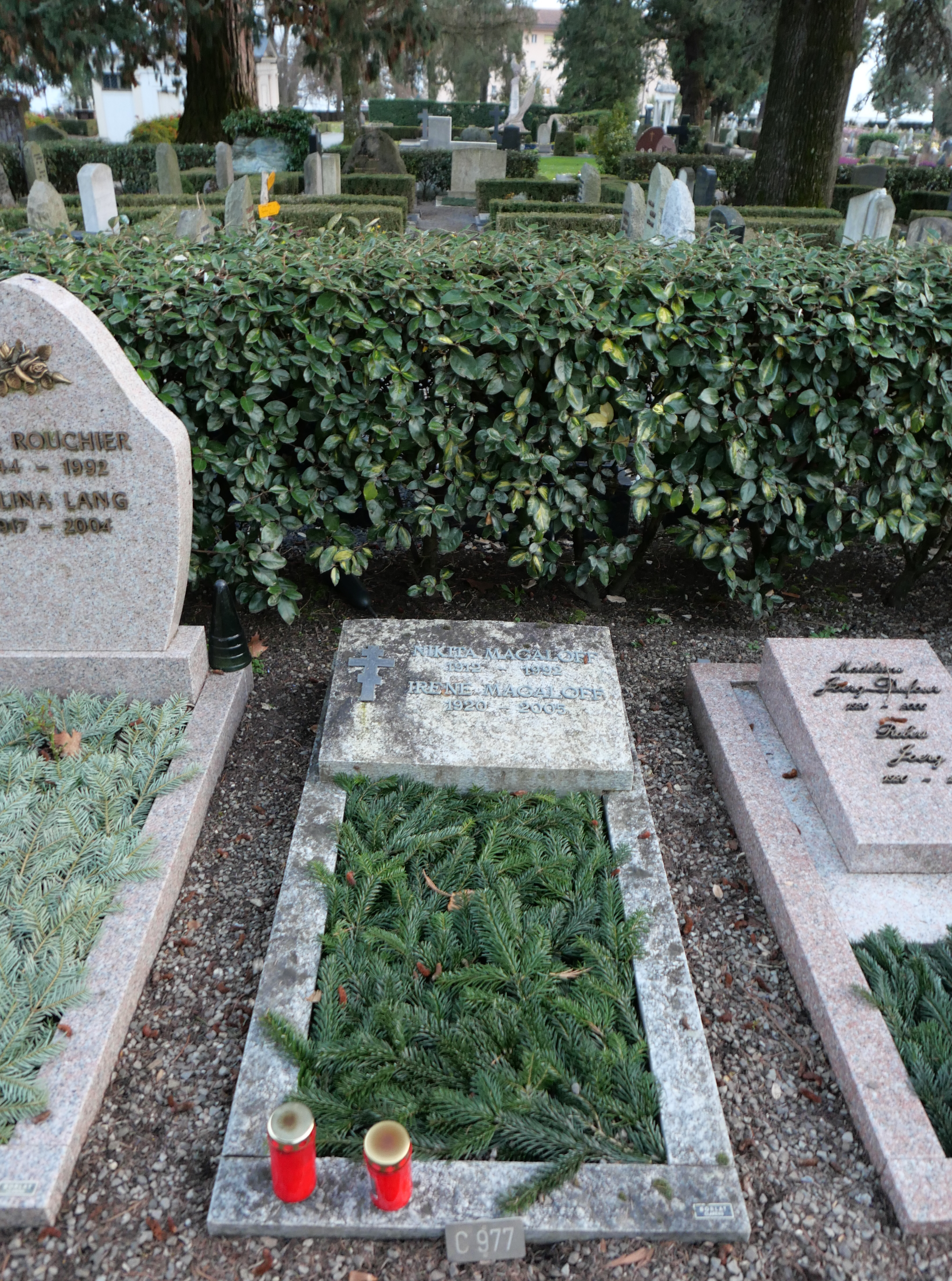
The grave in 2024.

Among his many pupils were the pianists Martha Argerich, Jean Derbès, Maria Tipo, Ingrid Haebler, Giorgio Koukl and Valery Sigalevitch, and the organist Lionel Rogg.

Nikita Magaloff was married to Irene (1920–2005), the daughter of the violinist Joseph Szigeti (1892-1973) with whom he had established his international reputation in concerts before the war interrupted his career. He died in Vevey, Switzerland on 26 December 1992. He found his final resting place at the cemetery of Clarens-Montreux in the Swiss canton of Vaud, just a few meters from the tomb of his father-in-law Joseph Szigeti and his mother-in-law Wanda, née Ostrowska (1895-1969). His wife Irene was buried at his side.

According to the manifest housed at the Salvador Dali museum in Tampa florida, Nikita arrived on the same ship (SS CHAMPLAIN) as Dali and Gala in New York in 1934.
