= Alexander Ossovsky =

Russian musical writer and critic

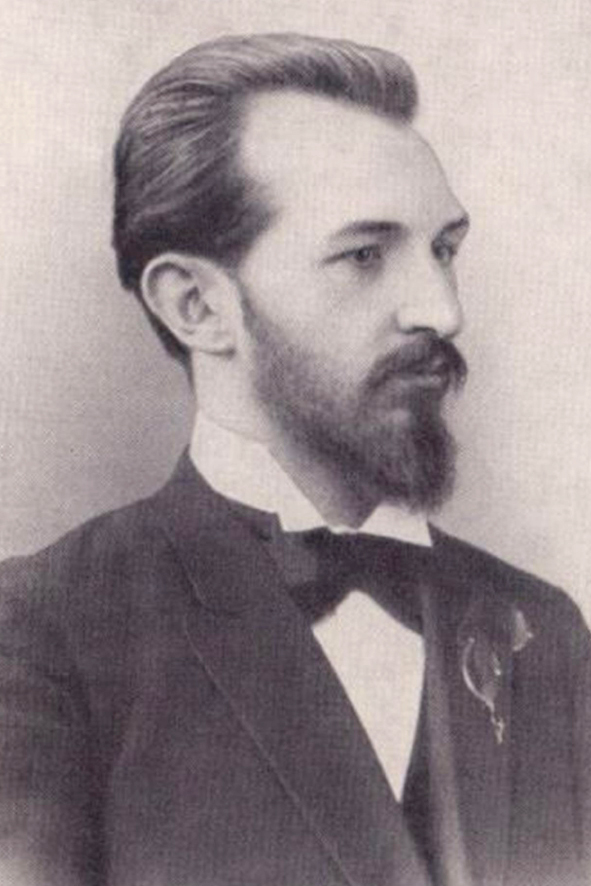

Alexander Vyacheslavovich Ossovsky (Russian: Александр Вячеславович Оссовский, 31 March [O.S. 19 March] 1871 – July 31, 1957) was a Russian and Soviet musicologist, music critic and professor at Saint Petersburg Conservatory, pupil of Nikolai Rimsky-Korsakov, and friend of Sergei Rachmaninoff, Alexander Siloti and Nikolai Tcherepnin.

== Biography ==
Alexander Ossovsky was born on March 31, 1871, in Chișinău, Bessarabia, Russian Empire. His father, Vyacheslav Stepanovich Ossovsky, was a department chair in the Odesa Court, and his mother was Yevgenia Cherkunova. The composer Mykola Vilinsky was his cousin.

Ossovsky began studying the violin at the age of seven, and music theory at the age of eleven. In 1889 he entered the law school at Moscow University, and after four years of study graduated with a law degree in 1893. In 1894 he relocated to St. Petersburg to pursue private studies in music composition with Nikolai Rimsky-Korsakov. He simultaneously worked at the Ministry of Justice in Saint Petersburg.

From 1896 to 1898 Ossovsky studied at Saint Petersburg Conservatory. From 1900 to 1902 he studied composition with the composer Nikolai Rimsky-Korsakov. In 1894 Ossovsky started his career as a talented and prolific musical writer, musical critic and musicologist. Between 1915 and 1918 and 1921 to 1952, Ossovsky was a professor at the Saint Petersburg Conservatory (then Leningrad Conservatory), and in 1937 he became a deputy director there.

He was one of the founders of "Muzykal'nyi Sovremennik" ("Musical Contemporary") magazine in Saint Petersburg (1915–17). From 1923 to 1925 Ossovsky was the director, and from 1933 to 1936 the Art Chair, at the Leningrad Philharmonic. From 1943 to 1952 he was director at the Leningrad Music and Theater Research Institute. In 1931–33 he worked at the State Hermitage Museum in Leningrad.

Ossovsky maintained close ties with the composers of Belyayev's Circle and had become friend and colleague with a number of the members of Russian musical elite, including Sergei Rachmaninoff, Alexander Siloti and Alexander Glazunov. He contributed extensively to Siloti's concert programs as a writer, editor and critic. At the same time, Ossovsky had connections with modernist figures – Sergei Diaghilev, Alexandre Benois, and Igor Stravinsky.

In 1907, Ossovsky collaborated with music critic Michel-Dimitri Calvocoressi on the commemorative volume Cinq concerts historiques russes donnés sous le patronage de la Société des Grandes Auditions Musicales de France (see p. 90 for the authors ), published in conjunction with Sergei Diaghilev's celebrated "Russian Historical Concerts" in Paris. Intended for a French audience, the richly illustrated publication contained essays on Russian music, biographical sketches of composers and performers, concert programmes, and explanatory notes.

In 1911 he helped Sergei Prokofiev publish his first works by writing a special letter in strong support of the composer to the Russian publisher P. Jurgenson. The same year, in Kyiv, Rachmaninoff at the request of Ossovsky auditioned Ossovsky's cousin, Ksenia Derzhinskaia (1889–1951), and helped to launch her opera career; she became an eminent Russian singer and prima donna at the Bolshoi Theatre in Moscow. Ossovsky was a friend of the composer Nikolai Tcherepnin and mentored his son – also a famous composer, Alexander Tcherepnin – during the early years of his career.

Following the 1917 revolution, Oleksandr Ossovsky left Petrograd due to fears of political repressions and moved to Ukraine, the homeland of his ancestors, where the ruling authorities maintained a relatively favorable attitude toward intellectuals. He resided and worked in both Kyiv and Odesa from 1918 to 1921. Within the Ukrainian government under Pavlo Skoropadsky, Ossovsky was appointed as the Deputy Minister of Justice. He held professorships at the Kyiv Conservatory, the Lysenko Higher Institute of Music and Drama, and the Odesa Conservatory, while also delivering public lectures and participating in cultural-educational initiatives.

During the Soviet period, Ossovsky was targeted by political repressions due to his earlier role in the Skoropadsky administration. As a result, he was stripped of his voting rights and lost his academic post at the Leningrad Conservatory under a "first category" designation during the institutional "proletarian purges". Though his civil rights were reinstated in 1931, the ongoing threat of further persecution and potential arrest severely limited his ability to publish his work for an extended period.

Ossovsky died in 1957, in Leningrad, Soviet Union (now Saint Petersburg, Russia). He had written a series of papers and monographs dedicated to research and analysis of the works of such outstanding Russian composers as Mikhail Glinka, Glazunov, Rimsky-Korsakov, Scriabin, and others. He was one of the first musicologists who introduced music of Bach, Rameau, Corelli, Vivaldi and Wagner to the Russian public. His memoir of Rachmaninoff is of special interest and value, because he gives first-hand accounts of, and insights into, many important events in the biographies of Rachmaninoff and other musicians. Ossovsky's works are frequently cited in many Western publications about Russian composers and their music.

== Selected works (in Russian) ==
1. Aleksandr Konstantinovich Glazunov: His life and creative work, Alexander Siloti Concerts Publishing House, Saint Petersburg, 1907
2. Mirovoe znachenie russkoi muzyki, (Worldwide significance of Russian classical music), Leningrad, 1948
3. N.A. Rimsky-Korsakov, in "Soviet Music" coll. of papers, book 3, Moscow, 1944
4. Selected papers and memoirs. Leningrad, 1961
5. Muzikal'no-kriticheskie stat'ji (Musical and critic papers), Leningrad, 1971
6. Vospominaniia. Issledovaniia (Memoirs. Research). Leningrad, 1968
