= Serge Tcherepnin =

Composer and electronic instrument builder

Serge Alexandrovich Tcherepnin (Russian: Серге́й Алекса́ндрович Черепни́н; born 2 February 1941) is a Russian-American composer and electronic-instrument builder of Russian-Chinese parentage. Tcherepnin is noted for creating the Serge Modular synthesizer.

== Biography ==
Serge Tcherepnin was born in Issy-les-Moulineaux, near Paris, the son of composer Aleksandr Nikolayevich Tcherepnin and grandson of composer Nikolai Nikolayevich Tcherepnin. His mother was Chinese pianist Lee Hsien Ming. An online biography of Alexander by Phillip Ramey, Vice-President of The Tcherepnin Society, includes a photograph of the family and shows Serge at a young age.

Serge had trained in France under Nadia Boulanger and studied at Harvard University with Leon Kirchner and Billy Jim Layton from 1958 to 1963. He became a naturalized American citizen in 1960. In 1961 he studied at the Darmstadt Vacation Courses with Luigi Nono. He studied in Europe with Pierre Boulez, Herbert Eimert, and Karlheinz Stockhausen between 1966 and 1968. From 1968 to 1970 he participated in the Intermedia Program at New York University.

As an instructor at CalArts under Morton Subotnick, Serge was exposed to some of the earliest modular synthesizers designed by Don Buchla. This environment led Serge to develop his own eponymous modular synthesizer system called the Serge Modular. Electronics were manufactured by his own company Serge Modular Music Systems, which was officially founded in 1974 and occupied various locations in California, including Hollywood. After closing the company in 1986, he returned to France.

As of 2018 Serge is once again involved in modular synthesis, having been appointed as "Chief Innovation Officer" of German synthesizer company Random*Source which has largely focused on recreating the Serge Modular system using modern manufacturing techniques.

== Family ==
Serge's brother Ivan Aleksandrovich Tcherepnin was also a well-known composer, and Ivan’s sons Stefan (born 1977) and Sergeï (born 1975) are also involved in composition.

== Compositions ==
A selective list includes:

- Inventions, for piano (1960)
- String Trio (1960)
- String Quartet (1961)
- Kaddish (text by Allen Ginsberg), for speaker, flute, oboe, clarinet, violin, piano, two percussionists (1962)
- Figures-Grounds, for 7–77 instruments (1964)
- Morning After Piece, for saxophone and piano (1966)
- Two Tapes (Giuseppe’s Background I–II), for 4-track tape (1966)
- Two More Tapes (Addition and Subtraction), for 2-track tape (1966)
- Quiet Day at Bach, for solo instrument and tape (1967)
- Piece of Wood, multimedia piece for performers and actors (1967)
- Piece of Wood with Weeping Woman, multimedia piece for performers, women, stagehand, and tape (1967)
- Film, for Baschet instruments, traditional instruments, tape machines, four-channel amplification, ring modulators, theater, stage, and lights (1967)
- For Ilona Kabos, for piano (1968)
- Definitive Death Music, for amplified saxophone and chamber ensemble (1968)
- "Hat" for Joseph Beuys, for actor and tape (1968)
- Paysages électroniques, film score (1977)
- Samba in Aviary, film score (1978)

== Sources ==
- Hoffmann, Ralf. 2018. "Serge (Himself!) Is Back". Frankfurt: Randomsource.net (13 November; accessed 4 February 2019).
- Marshall, Ingram. 1975. "New Music at Cal Arts: The First Four Years (1970–74)." Numus 2, no. 1 (Winter): 52–60.
- Palmer, Christopher, and Barry Schrader. 2001. "Tcherepnin: (3) Serge (Alexandrovich) Tcherepnin". The New Grove Dictionary of Music and Musicians, second edition, edited by Stanley Sadie and John Tyrrell. London: Macmillan Publishers.
- Ramey, Phillip. n.d. "Alexander Tcherepnin". The Tcherepnin Society website (accessed 4 February 2019).
