= Princess Pat (brand) =

Princess Pat was a Chicago-based cosmetics company established by the husband and wife team of Patricia and M. Martin Gordon. The company was an early leader in cosmetic advertising and at one point had offices in Chicago, New York City, Toronto and London.

The brand name was first used in July, 1919, and was likely an attempt to capitalize on the popularity of Princess Patricia of Connaught, known as Princess Pat, whose marriage made international headlines only five months earlier.

Many Hollywood actresses such as Louise Brooks and Loretta Young were used to endorse Princess Pat products.
