= The Fair at Sorochyntsi (short story) =

Short story by Russian writer Nikolai Gogol

"The Fair at Sorochyntsi" is the first story in the collection Evenings on a Farm Near Dikanka written in 1829–1832 by Nikolai Gogol. Later in the 19th century the story was adapted as an opera of the same name by Modest Mussorgsky (left unfinished by the composer, and completed by other hands).

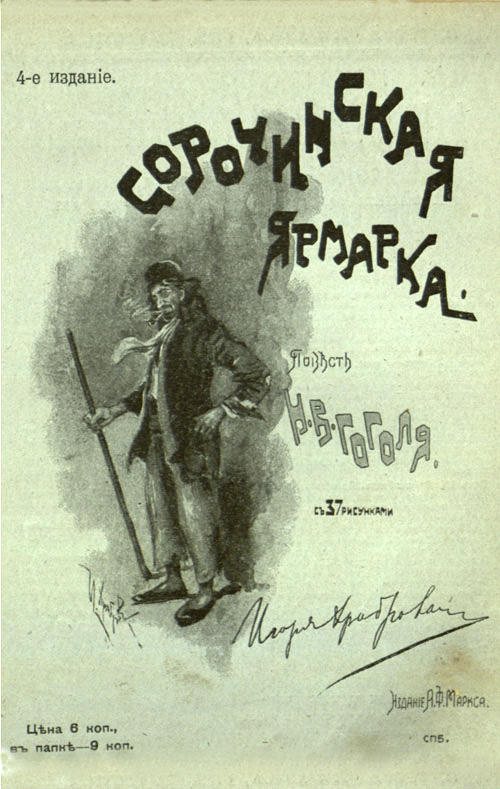
The Fair at Sorochyntsi

== Plot summary ==
This story opens with the novice narrator described in Panko's introduction providing a literary description of the beauty of Ukraine (then known as Little Russia) and sets the date in August 1800. The main characters of the story, Solopy Cherevik, his wife Khavronya Nikiforovna, and his daughter Paraska, are traveling to the fair to sell some items, including their old mare.

A young man, called the "young man in the white jacket" at first - later we learn his name is Grytsko - finds Paraska beautiful and starts to flirt with her. When her father becomes agitated, the young man makes it known that he is the son of Cherevik's friend and wants to marry Paraska. Cherevik first accepts but later declines because of his constantly enraged spouse and the young man decides to figure out a way to get her, agreeing to give up his oxen for 15 rubles in desperation to a gypsy, if he helps him. While Khavronya is having a tryst with Afanasy Ivanovich, a priest's son, they hear a group of people coming to her house, so she quickly has the young man hide up in the rafters. The group comes in and Tsibulya, a friend of Cherevik, begins to tell the tale of the "red jacket," a jacket worn by a demon that was kicked out of hell. The jacket was put into the hands of a Jew, to be returned later, but the Jew sold the jacket and the demon got angry and tormented him by having a number of pig heads appear at his windows. The group gets frightened because the boy in the rafters grunts for a moment, but the storyteller continues. The jacket was eventually found to be cursed, and anyone who possessed it would not be able to sell anything, so it is pawned off to different peasants.

Eventually, one determines he cannot sell his wares because of the jacket and chops it with an axe. It reforms, however, so he crosses himself and does it again, and the demon eventually had to come to collect the pieces of his jacket, and is down to the last fragment at the time the story is taking place.

At the end of the tale, a pig's head appears at the window and the group becomes so frightened that Cherevik, with a basket on his head, runs out of the house while someone is screaming "devil" behind him. His wife jumps on him and they’re found in this state to the amusement of everyone. In the morning, after recovering from the embarrassment, Cherevik takes their mare to be sold at market. When he gets there someone asks him what he's selling and he wonders why they're asking this. Pulling on the harness, which causes him to strike himself in the face, he finds the horse is gone and a bit of a red jacket is left in place. He is accused of stealing his own horse and is bound up in a shed with his friend Tsibulya. The young man in the white jacket finds him there and agrees to release him if he can marry his daughter, to which Cherevik agrees. The story concludes with their marriage and the completion of the scheme, the "demon" being none other than the gypsy.

== Development ==
Gogol wrote to his mother, requesting information about various aspects of Ukrainian life. The information he received about weddings was incorporated into The Fair at Sorochyntsi.
