= Ivan Tcherepnin =

American composer (1943–1998)

Ivan Alexandrovich Tcherepnin (Russian: Ива́н Алекса́ндрович Черепни́н) (February 5, 1943 in Issy-les-Moulineaux, France – April 11, 1998 in Boston, USA) was an experimental, then later modernist/postmodernist, composer and a noted innovator in the field of electronics and modular synthesizers.

Ivan was born into a highly musical family, his father and grandfather, Alexander and Nikolai, being distinguished Russian composers, and his mother Ming (born: Lee Hsien Ming) a well-known pianist. His elder brother, Serge is also a composer. He studied with Leon Kirchner, Karlheinz Stockhausen, Henri Pousseur, and Pierre Boulez. After teaching briefly at both the San Francisco Conservatory of Music and Stanford University, he became director of the Harvard University Electronic Music Studio from 1972, remaining there until his death in 1998. The Tcherepnin legacy continues with two of Ivan's sons, Stefan and Sergei.

Ivan Tcherepnin was the winner of the 1996 Grawemeyer Award for Music Composition for his Double Concerto for Violin, Cello and Orchestra. His other honors include awards from the American Society of Composers, Authors and Publishers (1963–1995) and the National Endowment for the Arts (1977). His performance of "Santur Opera" earned the 1982 Grand Prize of the Ars Electronica Festival in Linz, Austria.

Tcherepnin's notable students include Curt Cacioppo. He earned his BA from Harvard College in 1964.

== Selected compositions ==
- Fêtes (Variations on Happy Birthday) (1975)
- Le va et le vient (1978)
- Santur Opera (1977)
- Flores Musicales (1980)
- Double Concerto for Violin, Cello, and Orchestra (1995) – winner of the University of Louisville Grawemeyer Award for Music Composition. Tcherepnin described the piece as reminiscent of, and in some places actually borrowing from, the works of Tchaikovsky, Scriabin, Schoenberg, Debussy and Stravinsky, among others. The work invokes a ″celestial″ theme, with the violin descending and the cello ascending into a grand convergence and a brief period of reflection. The instruments then turn back toward the extremes and to a soft, peaceful conclusion.
