= Nikolai Tcherepnin =

Russian composer and pianist (1873–1945)

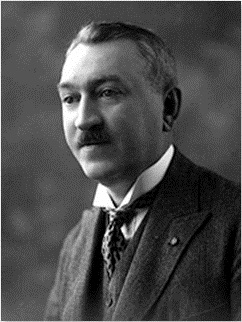
Tcherepnin in 1935

Nikolai Nikolayevich Tcherepnin or Cherepnin (Russian: Никола́й Никола́евич Черепни́н; 15 May [O.S. 3 May] 1873 – 26 June 1945) was a Russian composer, pianist, and conductor. He was born in Saint Petersburg and studied under Nikolai Rimsky-Korsakov at the Saint Petersburg Conservatory. He conducted for the first Paris season of Sergei Diaghilev's Ballets Russes.

== Life ==
Nikolai Tcherepnin was born in 1873 to a well-known and wealthy physician of the same name. The elder Nikolai moved in elite circles of artists including Fyodor Dostoyevsky and Modest Mussorgsky. Young Nikolai's mother died when he was a baby, and when his father remarried, was replaced by an ambivalent stepmother. As a child, Nikolai's father beat him regularly and enforced a general code of strict discipline.

At his father's insistence, Nikolai earned a law degree, though during this time he composed steadily. In 1895 he graduated with his degree in law from the University of Saint Petersburg. In 1898, he earned a degree in composition under Nikolai Rimsky-Korsakov and a degree in piano under Karel van Ark. His talents and high family status earned him a job as the orchestral teacher at the Court Chapel in 1899. For six years he taught there before returning to the St. Petersburg Conservatory to teach there. During his 13-year tenure (from 1909 onward as professor) he taught many notable students, including Sergei Prokofiev, Aleksandr Gauk, Yuri Shaporin, and Lazare Saminsky.

In 1902 he became the regular conductor of the Russian Symphony Concerts and later made guest appearances with the Russian Musical Society, the Moscow Philharmonic Society, the Siloti Concerts and Ivan Vasilenko’s Historic Concerts as well conducting at the Mariinsky Theatre (1906–1909). A member of the Belyayev circle, he was also involved with the Kruzhok sovremennoy muzyki (‘The Contemporary Music Circle’) and worked with the Mir iskusstva (‘World of Art’) movement. Tcherepnin was a friend of the musicologist Alexander Ossovsky.

In 1907, during his time at the Conservatory, he wrote possibly his most famous work, the ballet Le Pavillon d'Armide. Two years later, Tcherepnin conducted the ballet at the premiere performance of Diaghilev's legendary Ballets Russes. He conducted for the entire first season and returned to conduct multiple times over the next five years. He conducted performances with the Ballets Russes in Berlin, Monte Carlo, Paris, Rome, and the Royal Opera House at Covent Garden in London. In addition to his professorship and his commitments with the Ballet, in 1908, he became conductor at the Mariinsky Theatre. At this post, he directed the Paris premiere of Rimsky-Korsakov's opera The Golden Cockerel.

From 1905 to 1917, he was principal of the conservatory of St. Petersburg, where he taught conducting. In 1918 he was invited to take the post of director of the National Conservatory of Tbilisi, the capital of the Democratic Republic of Georgia. Following the Bolshevik takeover of Georgia in 1921, he moved to Paris and lived there for the rest of his life. While in France, he worked with Anna Pavlova and her ballet troupe as composer and conductor (1922–1924) and made concert tours around Europe and the United States but abandoned his concert career in 1933 because of a deterioration in his hearing. In 1925 he founded the Russian Conservatory in Paris and served as its director for a number of years (1925–1929 and 1938–1945). In 1926 he became a member of the board of trustees of the Belyayev publishing house, where he later became president from 1937 until his death in 1945 in Issy-les-Moulineaux.

He was the father of the composer and pianist Alexander Tcherepnin.

== Works ==
=== Opera ===
- The Matchmaker (1930)
- Vanka the Steward (1933)

=== Ballet ===
- Le Pavillon d'Armide (1907)
- Narcisse et Écho (1911)
- The Masque of the Red Death (1915)
- Bacchus (1922)
- A Magical Russian Fairytale (1923)
- The Romance of the Mummy (1924)

=== Choral ===
- 2 Choruses (1899)
- The Song of Sappho (1899)
- The Descent of the Virgin Mary to Hell oratorio, 1934)

=== Orchestral ===
- La princesse lointaine (prelude to a play of the same name by Edmond Rostand), Op. 4 (1896)
- Macbeth (after act 4, scene 1), Op. 12 (1902)
- From Land to Land (1903)
- Piano Concerto in C-sharp minor, Op. 30 (1905)
- Mar'ya Morevna (symphonic poem) (1909)
- The Enchanted Kingdom (1910)
- 6 Musical Illustrations to Pushkin's "Tale about the Fisherman and the Fish" (1917)
- Destiny (1938)

=== Chamber music ===
- Lyrical Poem, for string quartet (1898)
- Melody, for violin and piano (1902)
- 5 Pieces for Piano (1904)
- 6 Horn Quartets (1910)
- The Alphabet in Pictures, for Piano (1910)
- Cadence fantastique, for Violin and Piano (1915)

=== Orchestrations and completions ===
- Modest Mussorgsky: Sorochyntsi Fair (1923)
- Sokolovsky: The Miller-Wizard, Cheat and Matchmaker (1925)

== Family ==
His son Alexander Tcherepnin (1899–1977), grandsons (son of Alexander) Ivan Tcherepnin (1943–1998) and Serge Tcherepnin, and great-grandsons (sons of Ivan) Sergei Tcherepnin and Stefan Tcherepnin, are also composers.

== Sources ==
- Tcherepnin, Nikolay by Christopher Palmer, in 'The New Grove Dictionary of Opera', ed. Stanley Sadie (London, 1992) ISBN 0-333-73432-7
- Savenko, Svetlana, et al. "Tcherepnin: (1) Nikolay Tcherepnin". 2002. New Grove Dictionary of Music and Musicians. 7 June 2008.
