= Phillip Ramey =

American composer

- Born: September 12, 1939; Elmhurst, Illinois, United States
- Education: DePaul University; Columbia University
- Occupations: Composer; Pianist; Writer on music

Phillip Ramey (born September 12, 1939) is an American composer and pianist and author of three books about composers.

Ramey was born in Elmhurst, Illinois. He studied composition with the Russian-born composer Alexander Tcherepnin from 1959 to 1962, first at the International Academy of Music in Nice, France, then at DePaul University in Chicago. He later studied composition with Jack Beeson at Columbia University (1962–65). He had professional associations with Aaron Copland, Samuel Barber, Leonard Bernstein, Virgil Thomson, William Schuman, David Diamond and Vladimir Horowitz. Thomson honored him with a musical portrait for piano titled "Phillip Ramey: Thinking Hard", and Copland dedicated two piano pieces to him: "Midsummer Nocturne" and "Proclamation".

For many years, Ramey was a close friend and a neighbor of Paul Bowles in Tangier, Morocco, where he has summered regularly. In 2017, the New York Public Library acquired Ramey's archive of manuscripts, scores and recordings of his music, which will be catalogued and made available for scholarly research.

Ramey is the composer of orchestral works, including three piano concertos, along with chamber music and many works for solo piano, among them ten sonatas. In 1993 his Concerto for Horn and String Orchestra, commissioned by the New York Philharmonic for its 150th anniversary celebrations, was premiered by that orchestra under Leonard Slatkin, with Philip Myers as soloist.

On November 14, 1985, Proclamation for Orchestra, Ramey's orchestration of Copland's Proclamation for Piano, received simultaneous premieres on both coasts: by the New York Philharmonic under Zubin Mehta and the Los Angeles Philharmonic conducted by Erich Leinsdorf. (The New York Philharmonic concert was telecast as "Aaron Copland's 85th Birthday", episode 61 of the Live from Lincoln Center telecasts.)

Ramey is the author of several hundred liner notes and interviews with American composers. He served from 1977 to 1993 as the annotator and Program Editor for the New York Philharmonic. He is also the author of Irving Fine: An American Composer in His Time, which received the 2006 ASCAP Deems Taylor/Nicolas Slonimsky Award for Outstanding Musical Biography.

Ramey appeared in the 1998 documentary Let It Come Down: The Life of Paul Bowles and the 2000 documentary Night Waltz: The Music of Paul Bowles. He is Vice-President Emeritus of The Tcherepnin Society.

In August 2024, the Archives of The New York Philharmonic established “The Phillip Ramey Collection”. This contains a multitude of the composer’s musical scores, manuscripts, recordings, writings, publications, correspondence and photographs. It ensures, states the Philharmonic, that “this important body of work will remain intact and available to qualified researchers and performers, today and for future generations.”

== Selected compositions ==
- 1959 - "Three Early Preludes for Piano"
- 1960-63 - "Suite for Piano" (revised 1988)
- 1960 - " Three Preludes for Solo Horn"
- 1960 - "Incantations for Piano"
- 1961 - "Piano Sonata No. 1"
- 1962 - "Sonata for Three Unaccompanied Timpani"
- 1962 - "Concert Suite for Piano and Small Orchestra" (revised, reorchestrated and expanded 1984 as " Concert Suite for Piano and Orchestra")
- 1962 - " Cat Songs for Soprano, Flute and Piano" (text: T. S. Eliot)
- 1965 - "Seven, They Are Seven: Incantation for Bass-Baritone and Orchestra" (text: Konstantin Balmont)
- 1966 - " Diversions for Piano"
- 1966 - "Piano Sonata No. 2"
- 1966 - "Capriccio for Percussion"
- 1967 - "Epigrams for Piano, Book I"
- 1967 - "Orchestral Discourse"
- 1967 - "Night Music for Percussion"
- 1968 - "Piano Sonata No. 3"
- 1968 - "Harvard Bells, Soundpiece for Piano"
- 1968 - "Toccata Breva for Percussion"
- 1968 - "Commentaries for Flute and Piano"
- 1969-71 - "Piano Concerto No. 1"
- 1969-72 - "Piano Fantasy"
- 1971 - "Suite for Violin and Piano"
- 1972 - " Leningrad Rag (Mutations on Scott Joplin) for Piano"
- 1974 - "Concerto for Chamber Orchestra"
- 1976 - "Piano Concerto No. 2"
- 1977 - " Memorial (In Memoriam Alexander Tcherepnin) for Piano"
- 1977 - "Arabesque for Solo Flute"
- 1979 - " La Citadelle, Rhapsody for Oboe and Piano"
- 1980 - "A William Blake Trilogy for Soprano and Piano"
- 1980 - "Autumn Pastorale for Piano"
- 1981/85 - " Cossack Variations for Piano]"
- 1981 - "Fanfare-Sonata for Solo Trumpet"
- 1982 - "Canzona for Piano]"
- 1983 - " Echoes for Piano"
- 1982-86 - "Moroccan Songs to Words of Paul Bowles for High Voice and Piano"
- 1984 - "Phantasm for Flute and Violin (or Two Violins)"
- 1984 - " Concert Suite for Piano and Orchestra"
- 1985 - "Proclamation for Orchestra (Orchestration of Aaron Copland's Proclamation for Piano)"
- 1985 - "Capriccio (Improvisation on a Theme from Youth) for Piano"
- 1986 - " Toccata No. 1 for Piano"
- 1986 - " Epigrams for Piano, Book II"
- 1987-88 - " Piano Sonata No. 4"
- 1987-93 - "Concerto for Horn and String Orchestra"
- 1989 - "Piano Sonata No. 5 (For the Left Hand)"
- 1989 - " Tangier Nocturne for Piano"
- 1990 - " Toccata No. 2 for Piano"
- 1990 - "Burlesque-Paraphrase on a Theme of Stephen Foster for Piano"
- 1990 - "Cantus Arcanus (In Memoriam Aaron Copland) for Piano"
- 1991-94 - "Piano Concerto No. 3"
- 1991-2013 - "Twenty-two Tangier Portraits for Piano"
- 1992 - "Rhapsody for Solo Cello"
- 1992 - " Café of the Ghosts: Fantasy-Trio on a Moroccan Beggar's Song for Violin, Cello and Piano"
- 1993 - "Trio Concertant for Violin, Horn and Piano"
- 1993 - "Chromatic Waltz for Piano"
- 1994 - "Color Etudes for Piano"
- 1994 - "Praeludium for Five Horns"
- 1995 - "Gargoyles for Solo Horn"
- 1995 - " Elegy for Horn and Piano"
- 1996 - "Concertino for Four Horns, Timpani and Percussion"
- 1997 - " Sonata-Ballade for Two Horns and Piano]"
- 1997 - "Dialogue for Two Horns]"
- 1997 - " Phantoms (Ostinato Etude) for Piano]"
- 1998 - "Sonata for Harpsichord"
- 1998 - "Effigies for Viola and Piano]"
- 1998 - "Lyric Fragment for Flute and Harpsichord (or Piano)"
- 2001 - "Lament for Richard III for Piano"
- 2002 - "Color Etudes for Piano and Orchestra" (arranged from "Color Etudes for Piano")
- 2002 - "Orchestral Epigrams"
- 2003 - "Winter Nocturne for Piano"
- 2004 - "Ode for F.D.R. for Piano"
- 2007 - "Primitivo for Piano"
- 2007 - "J.F.K.: Oration for Speaker and Orchestra" (text from speeches of President John F. Kennedy)
- 2008 - "Piano Sonata No. 6 (Sonata-Fantasia)"
- 2008 - "Dream Preludes for Trumpet and Piano"
- 2008 - "Ballade for Clarinet and Horn"
- 2008 - "Blue Phantom for Piano"
- 2009 - "Djebel Bani (A Saharan Meditation) for Piano"
- 2009 - "Simon Songs: Six Poems for Baritone and Piano" (text: John Simon)
- 2009 - "Simon Songs: Suite for Baritone and Orchestra" (text: John Simon)
- 2010 - "Slavic Rhapsody (The Novgorod Kremlin at Night) for Piano"
- 2010 - "Bagatelle on "Dies Irae" for Piano"
- 2010-11 - "Piano Sonata No. 7"
- 2011 - " Bagatelle on "Panis Angelicus" for Piano]"
- 2011 - "Manhattan Soundings for Piano"
- 2011-12 - "Piano Sonata No. 8"
- 2012 - "Demons of Barsoom (Homage to Edgar Rice Burroughs): Ballade for Trombone and Piano"
- 2012 - "Concerto for Trombone and String Orchestra, Harp and Percussion"
- 2012 - "Hurricane Etude for Piano"
- 2012 - "Bagatelle on Twelve Tones for Piano"
- 2013 - "Bagatelle with Thirds for Piano"
- 2013 - "Bagatelle Romantique (on Themes of Alexander Tcherepnin) for Piano"
- 2013 - "Night of the Djinns for Piccolo, Contrabassoon and Percussion"
- 2013 - "Piano Sonata No. 9 (Ballade)"
- 2014 - "Second Rhapsody for Oboe and Piano"
- 2014 - " Musings: Thirteen Pieces for Piano]"
- 2014 - "Loup-garou: Caprice for Tuba and Percussion"
- 2014-15 - " Piano Sonata No. 10]"
- 2015 - "Symphonic Song for String Orchestra]"
- 2015 - "Dead End, An Existential Song for Baritone and Piano" (text by composer)
- 2016 - "Noir Nocturne for Piano"
- 2016 - "Two Duos for Violin and Horn"
- 2016 - "Concerto-Rhapsody for Cello and Orchestra"
- 2018 - "Lyric Duo for Violin and Horn"
- 2018-19 - "Concerto Episodes for Violin, Horn and Piano"
- 2019 - "Golgotha Prelude for Piano"
- 2019 - "Chromatic Poem for Piano"
- 2019 - "Nostalgic Variation on an Original Theme for Piano"
- 2019 - "Poem in Autumn for Oboe and Piano (or Oboe Solo)"
- 2020 - "Winter Daydream for Piano"
- 2020 - "Plague Prelude for Piano"
- 2020-21 - "Night Journey, Rhapsody for Piano"
- 2022 -"Cluster Palace: Soundpiece for Piano, with Optional Oboe Solos"
- 2024 - "A Liturgical Memento for Horn and Piano"
- 2024 - "An Embassy in Deutschland: Nocturne for Piano"
- 2025 - "White Nights: Legend (after Dostoyevsky) for Violin and Piano"
- 2026 - "Winter Ballad (An Etude in Dissonance) for Piano"
- 2026 - "Solar Eclipse for Solo Trumpet"

== Recordings ==
- 2019 - Piano Sonata No. 10, Barbara Nissman, pianist, CD. Three Oranges Recordings 3 OR-26.
- 2017 - Phillip Ramey: Music for French Horn. Philip Myers, horn; Howard Wall, horn; Elmira Darvarova, violin; Virginia Perry Lamb, piano. Affetto Records (Naxos) CD AF1704. Trio Concertant for Violin, Horn and Piano; Elegy for Horn and Piano; Gargoyles for Solo Horn; Two Duos for Violin and Horn; Dialogue for Two Horns; Sonata-Ballade for Two Horns and Piano. (Booklet notes by the composer.)
- 2017 - Symphonic Song for String Orchestra; Ukrainian Festival Orchestra, Paul Mann, conductor, CD. Toccata Classics, TOCC 0370.
- 2013 - Phillip Ramey Piano Music, Volume Four: 1959-2011. Stephen Gosling, pianist. CD. Toccata Classics, TOCC 0153: Incantations, Cossack Variations, Three Early Preludes, Piano Sonata No. 3, Epigrams Book Two, Lament for Richard III, Piano Sonata No. 7. (Booklet notes by Benjamin Folkman and the composer.)
- 2011 - Phillip Ramey Piano Music, Volume Three: 1960-2010. Stephen Gosling, pianist. CD. Toccata Classics, TOCC 0114: Suite, Two Short Pieces, Toccata Giocosa, Slavic Rhapsody (The Novgorod Kremlin at Night), Burlesque-Paraphrase on a Theme of Stephen Foster, Bagatelle on "Dies Irae", Djebel Bani (A Saharan Meditation), Blue Phantom, Piano Sonata No. 6 (Sonata-Fantasia). (Booklet notes by Benjamin Folkman and the composer.)
- 2008 - Phillip Ramey Piano Music, Volume Two: 1966-2007. Mirian Conti, pianist. CD. Toccata Classics, TOCC 0077: Diversions, Epigrams Book One, Leningrad Rag--Mutations on Scott Joplin, Winter Nocturne, Toccata No. 1, Ode for F.D.R., Toccata No. 2, Piano Sonata No. 4, Primitivo. (Booklet notes by Benjamin Folkman, Mirian Conti and the composer.)
- 2006 - Phillip Ramey Piano Music, 1961-2003. Stephen Gosling, pianist. CD. Toccata Classics, TOCC 0029: Color Etudes, Memorial--In Memoriam Alexander Tcherepnin, Chromatic Waltz, Piano Sonata No. 1, Piano Sonata No. 2, Piano Sonata No. 5--for the Left Hand, Piano Fantasy, Four Tangier Portraits, Toccata No. 2. (Booklet notes by Benjamin Folkman and the composer.)
- 1986 - American Piano Music, Volume Two. Etcetera Records, KTC 1036. CD. Phillip Ramey: Canzona, Bennett Lerner, pianist.
- 1984 - American Piano Music. Etcetera Records, KTC 1019. CD. Phillip Ramey: Piano Fantasy, Bennett Lerner, pianist.
- 1978 - Opus One, No. 37. LP. Leningrad Rag, Piano Fantasy, Piano Sonata No. 4 (Subsequently retitled Harvard Bells: Soundpiece), John Atkins, pianist.
- 1975 - Carlos, Wendy (né Walter). Walter Carlos, By Request. LP. Columbia. Re-released as Wendy Carlos, By Request on enhanced CD in 2003 by East Side Digital (Minneapolis, Minnesota). Performed by Wendy Carlos, synthesizer; with Phillip Ramey, pianist (4th and 5th works: Dialogues for piano and two loudspeakers and Episodes for piano and electronic sounds).
- 1965 - Electronic Music. LP. Vox Turnabout. Carlos, Walter, Dialogues for piano and two loudspeakers with Phillip Ramey, pianist.

== Books ==
- Ramey, Phillip. Irving Fine: An American Composer in His Time. Hillsdale, New York/Washington, D. C.: Pendragon Press, in association with the U. S. Library of Congress, 2005.
- Ramey, Phillip. Sergei Prokofiev: The Modern Classicist. Time-Life booklet, 1975.
- Ramey, Phillip. Rachmaninoff: His Life and Times. Funk & Wagnalls booklet, 1975
