= Chinese Songs (Tcherepnin) =

Cycle of Seven Chinese Folk Songs, Op. 95, is a 1962 song collection composed in America by Alexander Tcherepnin, who had performed in North China during the 1930s. The collection of seven songs (op.95 1962) was dedicated to the Chinese baritone Yi-Kwei Sze. Sze recorded the songs, together with two other Chinese songs from Op. 71 (1945), accompanied by pianist Brooks Smith in 1965 (Iramac LP 6517), which won the Netherlands Edison Award in 1966. Tcherepnin had also made English translations of the Chinese texts, and six of the songs were also performed in English by Korean soprano Christina Cha in English in 1965.

== Songs ==
Nine tracks as recorded:

1. 大河楊柳 Going home to Celebrate New Year (Yunnan)
2. 紅彩妹妹 My Darling Hongcai (Sui-Yung)
3. 小放牛 Buffalo Boy (from Hebei)
4. 送情郎 Farewell, my love (Folk-tune, Hebei, North China)
5. 鋤頭歌 Song of the Hoe
6. 馬車夫之歌 Love song of the Wagon Driver (Tibetan Folk-tune)
7. 在那遙遠的地方 So far Away! (from Qinghai)
8. 西江月 West River Moon (Poem by Li Po 699-762 a.D.)
9. 清平調」/ 青春舞曲 Dance of a little bird of youth (Tibetan Folk-dance)
