= Velyki Sorochyntsi =

Village in Poltava Oblast, Ukraine

Velyki Sorochyntsi Великі Сорочинці
- Village
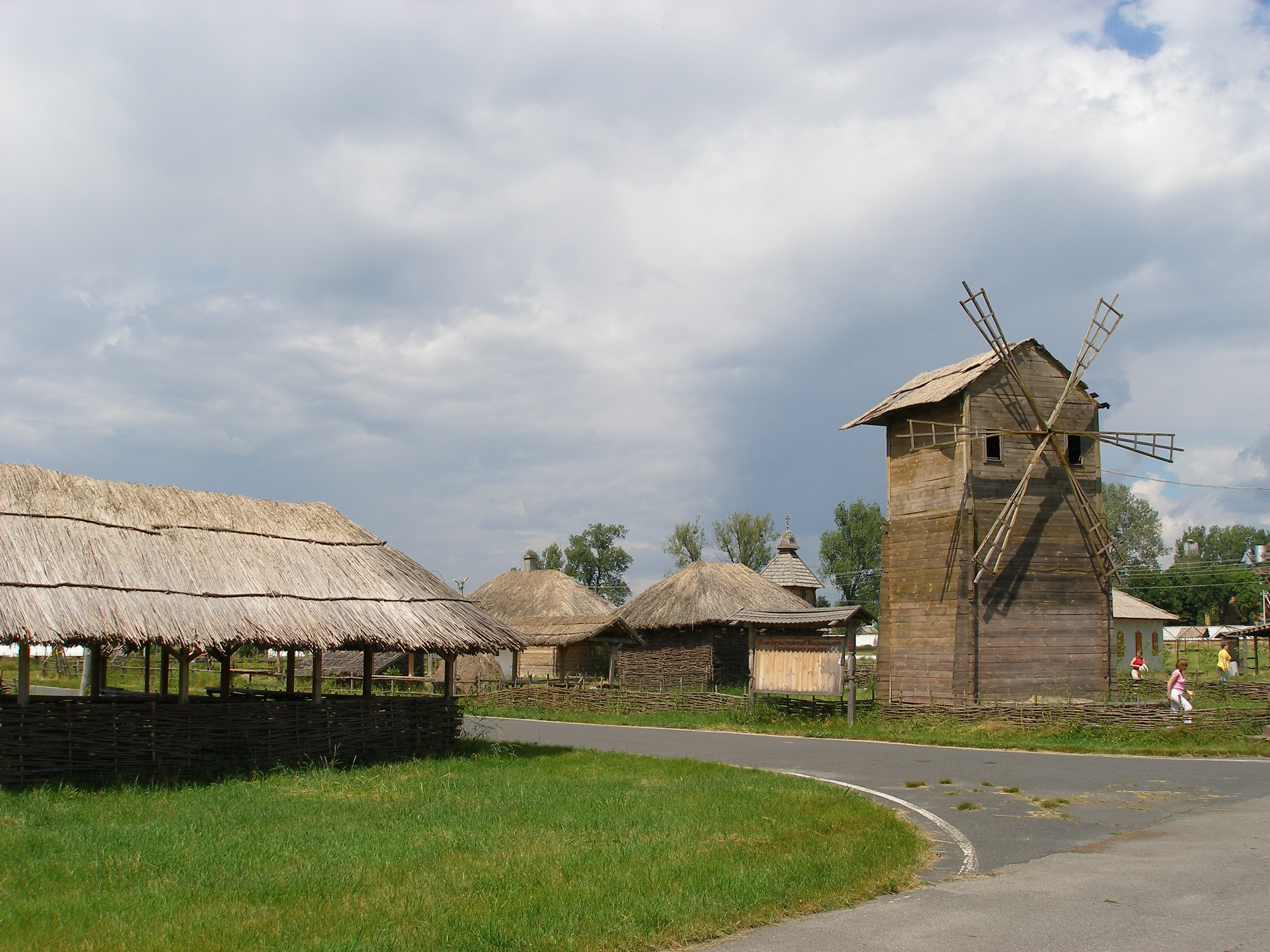
- Location of Sorochyntsi Fair

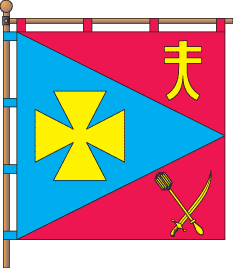
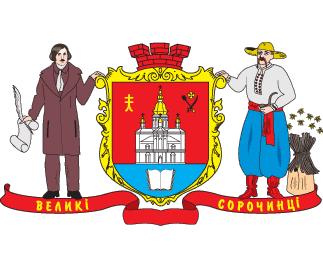
- Flag Coat of arms

- Location of Velyki Sorochyntsi within Poltava Oblast Velyki Sorochyntsi (Ukraine)
- Coordinates: 50°01′24″N 33°56′33″E
- Country: Ukraine
- Oblast: Poltava Oblast
- Raion: Myrhorod Raion
- Hromada: Velyki Sorochyntsi rural hromada
- Founded: 1620s

Population (2001)
  - Total: 4,231
- Postal code: 37645
- Area code: +380 5355

Velyki Sorochyntsi (Ukrainian: Великі Сорочинці; formerly referred to simply as Sorochyntsi) is a village in Myrhorod Raion, Poltava Oblast, central Ukraine. It formerly had town status. It hosts the administration of Velyki Sorochyntsi rural hromada, one of the hromadas of Ukraine. The village is famous as the birthplace of the writer Nikolai Gogol (1 April [O.S. 20 March] 1809) and the location of the Sorochyntsi Fair. In 1925–1931, the town was called Neronovychi after the Bolshevik activist Yevhen Neronovych, who was executed by Ukrainian military forces in the town in 1918.

The population as of 2013 was estimated at 3,809, down from 4,231 in the 2001 census.

The name of the village came either from the Slavic word soroka (magpie) or sorochka (shirt). There are many legends explaining the name of the village as the location of the Magpie's kingdom or of some magical shirt.

== History ==
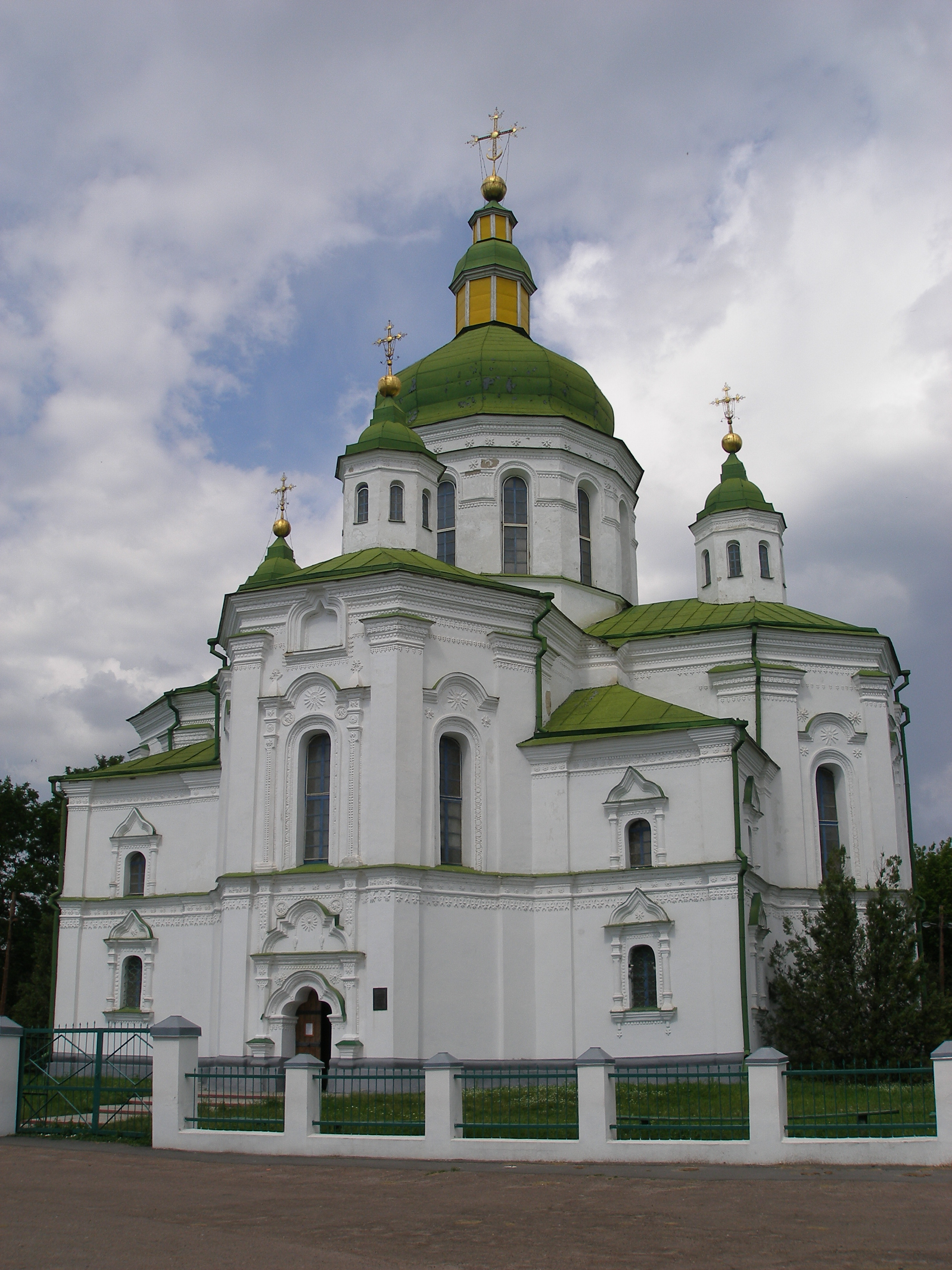
Transfiguration Church in Velyki Sorochyntsi, 1732

The earliest recorded mention of the settlement (sloboda) is in the 1620s. In 1646, the sloboda became the domain of a Polish Prince from the Wiśniowiecki family. By the end of the 17th and beginning of the 18th centuries, the sloboda was the location of a Cossack district (sotnia) government. Born here, the future Hetman of Zaporizhian Host Danylo Apostol in 1670 founded the Sorochyntsi St. Michael's Monastery. He went on to build the Ukrainian Baroque Church of the Transfiguration (Преображенська церква) in 1732, also in Sorochyntsi, where he was buried two years later. Nikolai Gogol was later baptized in this same church.

Since the middle of the 18th century, the large Sorochyntsi Fair (Ukrainian: Сорочинський ярмарок, romanized: Soročyns'kyj jarmarok; Russian: Сорочинcкaя яpмaркa, romanized: Sorochinskaya yarmarka) has been held in Velyki Sorochyntsi. Recurring five times a year in the time of the Russian Empire, the fair is now held annually since its revival after a 40-year moratorium during Soviet rule. Since the Presidential Decree of August 18, 1999, the fair bears the status of the National trade fair. The fair is a large showcase for traditional handicrafts made by skilled craftsmen, including Reshetylivka embroidery, rugs, Opishnia ceramics, as well theatrical performers who re-enact scenes of village life from famous Ukrainian stories.

From 1925 to 1931 the city was called Neronovychi after the Ukrainian People's Secretary of Military Affairs, Yevhen Neronovych.

== Population ==
According to the Ukrainian Census of 2001 in village resided 4050 people.

First language of communication
Language	No.	Percentage
Ukrainian	3968	97.98%
Russian	79	1.95%
Hungarian	1	0.02%
Belarusian	1	0.02%
German	1	0.02%

== Famous people ==
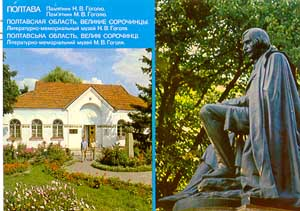
Velyki Sorochyntsi on a postage stamp from the Soviet Union, including the village's statues of Nikolai Gogol

On 1 April [O.S. 20 March] 1809, writer Nikolai Gogol was born in Velyki Sorochyntsi. His short story The Fair at Sorochyntsi made the small village, and its fair, world-famous.

On August 23, 1911, a monument to Nikolai Gogol (by the sculptor Ilya Ginzburg) was installed in the village. There is also the Gogol Memorial Museum in the village. In 1983, the Soviet Union issued a postage stamp showing the monument and the museum.

In 1845, Ukrainian poet Taras Shevchenko visited the village for the archeological commission, compiling the history and architecture of Poltavshchyna. There has been a street named in his honor in this village for over a half a century.

Once being categorized as a town the village is also a birthplace of other notable Ukrainians such as Hetman Danylo Apostol, writer Volodymyr Samiylenko, and many others.
