= Alexander Tcherepnin =

American composer (1899–1977)

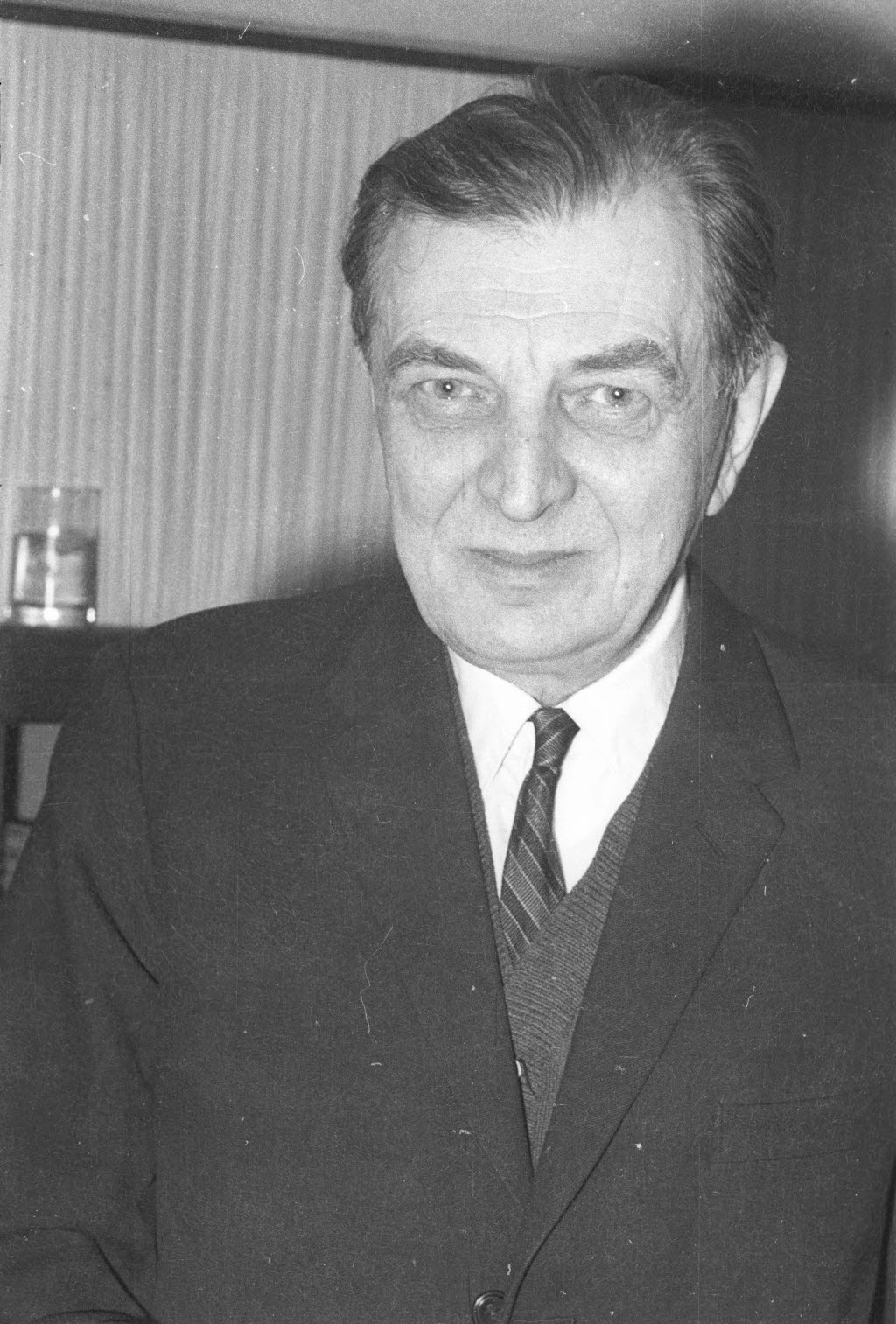
Alexander Tcherepnin (1965)

Alexander Nikolayevich Tcherepnin (Russian: Алекса́ндр Никола́евич Черепни́н, romanized: Aleksandr Nikolayevich Cherepnin; 21 January 1899 – 29 September 1977) was a Russian-born composer and pianist.

His father, Nikolai Tcherepnin (pupil of Nikolai Rimsky-Korsakov), and his sons, Serge Tcherepnin and Ivan Tcherepnin, as well as two of his grandsons (sons of Ivan), Sergei and Stefan, were composers. His son Serge was involved in the earliest development of electronic music and instruments. His mother was a member of the artistic Benois family, a niece of Alexandre Benois.

== Biography ==
He was born in Saint Petersburg, Russia, and played the piano and composed prolifically from a very early age. He was stimulated in this activity by the atmosphere at home, which—thanks to his family's Benois-Diaghilev connection—was a meeting place for many well-known musicians and artists of the day. By the time he began formal theory and composition studies in his late teens, he had already composed hundreds of pieces, including more than a dozen piano sonatas. Among his teachers in Russia were composer Victor Belyayev (pupil of Anatoly Lyadov and Alexander Glazunov), who prepared Tcherepnin for Saint Petersburg Conservatory; Leokadiya Kashperova (renowned pianist, protégée of Anton Rubinstein); and his professor at the Conservatory Nikolay Sokolov (pupil of Nikolai Rimsky-Korsakov). Notably at that time Tcherepnin's mentor was famous musicologist Alexander Ossovsky, who also was a friend of his father. His works were influenced by composer Alexander Spendiarov.

After the 1917 Russian Revolution, the family fled Saint Petersburg and settled for some time in Tbilisi, Georgia. In young Tcherepnin's luggage were some two hundred short piano pieces, quite a number of which eventually reached print (notably in his Bagatelles, Op. 5). In Tbilisi he continued his studies at the conservatory, gave concerts as both pianist and conductor and wrote music for the Kamerny Theatre. Because of the political environment in Tbilisi after Georgia was sovietized, the Tcherepnins chose to leave Russia permanently in 1921. They settled in Paris, where Alexander completed his studies with Paul Vidal and Isidor Philipp, who was the head of the piano department at the Paris Conservatory, and became associated with a group of composers that included Bohuslav Martinů, Marcel Mihalovici and Conrad Beck. Philipp secured the publication of several groups of short piano pieces that Tcherepnin had composed in Russia.

From Paris Tcherepnin launched an international career as a pianist and composer. In 1925 he won the Schott Prize with his Concerto da Camera, Op. 33. He began yearly visits to the United States in 1926 and later went to the Far East, making several extended visits to China and Japan between 1934 and 1937. He promoted composers in Japan (Akira Ifukube, Fumio Hayasaka, Bunya Koh, and others) and China (He Luting and others), even founding his own publishing house in Tokyo for the purpose. While in China, he met the young Chinese pianist Lee Hsien Ming (1915–1991), and the two later married in Europe. They had three sons together: Peter, Serge and Ivan.

During World War II, he lived in France. The war virtually stopped his musical activities. The immediate postwar period, however, brought a resurgence of creative energies; the result was a number of important works, beginning with Symphony No. 2 (composed 1947, not orchestrated until 1951). In 1948, he went to the United States, settling in Chicago in 1950 and in 1958 acquiring United States citizenship. He and his wife taught at DePaul University in Chicago. His students there included Phillip Ramey, Robert Muczynski, Gloria Coates, and John Downey. Tcherepnin's Symphony No. 3 was written while in Chicago during this time, commissioned in 1951 by Patricia and M. Martin Gordon, who were the founders of Princess Pat, a Chicago-based cosmetic company. The work was dedicated to Patricia Gordon and premiered in 1955 with Fabien Sevitzky conducting the Indianapolis Symphony Orchestra. Meanwhile, his Symphony No. 2 had its world premiere with the Chicago Symphony Orchestra in 1952 under the direction of Rafael Kubelík. In 1957, Tcherepnin completed two major American orchestral commissions: the Divertimento, Op. 90 (for Fritz Reiner and the Chicago Symphony Orchestra) and his Symphony No. 4, Op. 91 (for Charles Munch and the Boston Symphony Orchestra). In 1964 he moved to New York and subsequently divided his time between the United States and Europe. He died in Paris in 1977.

The Singapore Symphony Orchestra was the first to record his complete symphony cycle, conducted by Lan Shui. In 2008, these recordings were reissued together with Singapore Symphony performances of his six piano concertos (Noriko Ogawa, pianist), along with the Symphonic Prayer, Op. 93, Magna Mater, Op. 41 and other orchestral works.

He was a National Patron of Delta Omicron, an international professional music fraternity.

== Style and techniques ==
His output includes three operas, four symphonies, a divertimento (which is a symphony in all but name), six piano concertos, works for ballet, choral music, alto saxophone solo, and a large amount of solo piano music. His Symphony No. 1 (1927) is remarkable for including the first symphonic movement ever written completely for unpitched percussion; this preceded by four years Edgard Varèse's Ionisation of 1931. One of two symphonies left incomplete at his death would have been for percussion alone. Tcherepnin invented his own harmonic languages. The most famous of his synthetic scales, derived by combining minor and major hexachords, has nine notes and consists of three conjunct semitone-tone-semitone tetrachords. This came to be known as the "Tcherepnin scale", and may be classified with Messiaen's modes of limited transposition.

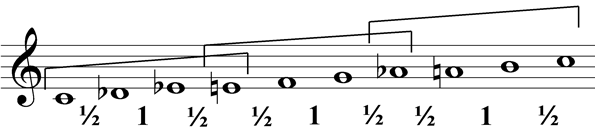

He also worked with pentatonic scales, old Russian modal tunes, Georgian harmonies, and a six-note "chromatic perfect" scale built upon half-step and step-and-a-half intervals also called as the augmented scale. Tcherepnin discussed these techniques in his monograph "Basic Elements of My Musical Language".

== Works ==
List of compositions by Alexander Tcherepin

Works with and without opus numbers are listed in this section, together with their dates of composition.

=== Songs ===
- My Flowering Staff (Цветущий Посох) A volume of poems by Sergei Gorodetsky, set to music in a cycle of 36 Songs (incorporating Opp. 15, 16 and 17) (1918–22)

=== Symphony ===
- Op. 42 Symphony No. 1 (1927)
- Op. 77 Symphony No. 2 (1946–51)
- Op. 83 Symphony No. 3 (1951)
  1. Incorporating music from the ballet Dionys (1940)
  2. Incorporating music from the ballet Atlantide (1943)
  3. Incorporating music from the ballet Le Vendeur des papillons (c.1945)
  4. Incorporating music from the ballet Dionys (1940)
- Op. 91 Symphony No. 4 (1957)

=== Orchestral ===
- Op. 5 Bagatelles, version for orchestra (1958)
- Op. 5 Bagatelles, version for piano and orchestra (1960)
- Op. 25 Rhapsody georgienne (Georgian Rhapsody) for cello and orchestra (1922)
- Op. 33 Concerto da Camera for flute, violin and chamber orchestra (1924)
- Op. 37 3 Stücke fur Kammerorchester (Three Pieces for Chamber Orchestra), 1921–25.
  1. Overture
  2. Mystère
  3. Pour un entrainment de boxe (For a Boxer's Training)
- Op. 37/2 Mystère for cello and chamber orchestra (1925)

=== Small Ensemble ===
- Op. 34 Trio for violin, cello and piano (1925)
- Op. 38 No. 2 Arrangement for cello and percussion
- Op. 38 No. 3 Arrangement for cello and strings
- Op. 38 No. 4 Arrangement for cello and percussion
- Op. 38 No. 9 Arrangement for cello and strings
- Op. 38 No. 10 Arrangement for cello and strings
- Op. 47 Trio Concertante, arrangement for violin, cello, piano and strings (1960)
- Op. 59 Trio for 3 flutes (1939)
- Op. 61 Trio for 3 trumpets or clarinets (1939)
- Op. posth. Canon (1922–23), transcription for piano of Canon for string trio, which is based on the second movement of the cello sonata

=== Piano ===
- Op. posth. Sunny Day (Forgotten Bagatelle) for piano (1915)
- Op. 1 Toccata No. 1 for piano (1921)
- Op. 2 No. 1 Nocturne No. 1 for piano (1919)
- Op. 2 No. 2 Danse No. 1 for piano (1919)
- Op. 3 Scherzo for piano (1917)
- Op. 4 Sonatine romantique for piano (1918)
- Op. 5 Bagatelles (10 pieces), original version for piano (1912–18). Revised and edited 1958.
- Op. 6 Petite Suite for piano (1918–19)
- Op. 7 Pièces sans titres (8 Pieces Without Title) for piano (1915–17)
- Op. 8 No. 1 Nocturne No. 2 for piano (1919)
- Op. 8 No. 2 Danse No. 2 for piano (1919)
- Op. 9 Eight Preludes for piano (1919–20)
- Op. 10 Feuilles libres (Loose Pages) for piano (1920)
- Op. 11 Arabesques for piano (1920–21)
- Op. 11 No. 5 Arabesque for Violin and Piano (1920–21)
- Op. 12 Piano Concerto No. 1 (1919–20)
- Op. 12 Arrangement of Piano Concerto No. 1 for 2 pianos.
- Op. 13 9 Inventions for piano (1920–21)
- Op. 14 Sonata for Violin and Piano (1921–22)
- Op. 15 6 Mélodies for soprano or tenor and piano (1921)
- Op. 16 8 Mélodies for soprano or tenor and piano (1918–22)
- Op. 17 Haltes (Stops) for soprano or tenor and piano (1918–22)
- Op. 18 10 Etudes for piano (1915–20)
- Op. 19 2 Novelettes for piano (1921–22)
- Op. 20 Toccata No. 2 for piano (1922)
- Op. 21 6 Études de travail (6 Practice Studies) for piano (1922–23)
- Op. 22 Piano Sonata No. 1 (1918–19)
- Op. 23 4 Nostalgic Preludes for piano (1922)
- Op. 24 4 Preludes for piano (1922–23)
- Op. 24 No. 3 Arrangement of Prelude No. 3 for two flutes and piano (1971)
- Op. 25 Rhapsody georgienne, arrangement for cello and piano.
- Op. 26 Piano Concerto No. 2 (1922–23), original version for smaller orchestra.
- Op. 26 Arrangement of Piano Concerto No. 2 for 2 pianos (1923)
- Op. 26 Piano Concerto No. 2, reorchestrated for larger orchestra (1950)
- Op. 27 Slavic Transcriptions for piano (1924)
  1. Les Bateliers du Volga (The Volga Boatmen)
  2. Chanson pour la cherie (Song for the Beloved)
  3. Chanson: Grandrussienne (The Great Russian People) (later title: Russian Song)
  4. Le Long du Volga (The Banks of the Volga)
  5. Chanson tchèque (Czech Song)
- Op. 28 Canzona for piano (1924)
- Op. 29 Sonata No. 1 for cello and piano (1924)
- Op. 30 No. 1 Sonata No. 2 for cello and piano (1924)
- Op. 30 No. 2 Sonata No. 3 for cello and piano (1919–26)
- Op. 31 4 Romances for piano (1924)
- Op. 33a Intermezzo, arrangement for piano solo of the second movement of Concerto da Camera (1926)
- Op. 33 Arrangement of Concerto da Camera for flute, violin and piano.
- Op. 43 Elegy for Violin and Piano (1929)
- Op. 44 Quintet for piano and strings (1927)
- Op. posth. Tanz (Dance), arrangement of second movement of the Quintet for piano (1928)
- Op. 46 Entretiens (Conversations), piano solo (1930)
- Op. 47 Concertino for violin, cello, piano and string orchestra (1930–31)
- Op. 47 Concertino, original version for 12 solo strings and piano (1930)
- Op. 47 Concertino, version for clarinet, bassoon, piano and strings (1944)
- Op. 47 Triple Concertino, definitive version for violin, cello, piano and orchestra (1965)
- Op. 48 Piano Concerto No. 3 (1931–32)
- Op. 48 Arrangement of Piano Concerto No. 3 for 2 pianos.
- Op. 49 Duo for violin and cello (1932)
- Op. 50 Dances russes (1933)
- Op. 51 Étude du piano sur la gamme pentatonique (Piano Study on the Pentatonic Scale) (1934–35)
  1. Première suite (1934)
  2. Deuxième suite (1934)
  3. Bagatelles chinoises (Chinese Bagatelles) (1935)
- Op. 52 Five Concert Etudes (1934–36)
  1. Shadow Play
  2. The Lute
  3. Homage to China
  4. Punch and Judy
  5. Chant
- Op. 53 Technical Exercises on the Five Note Scale, piano studies (1934–36)
- Op. 56 7 Etudes for piano (1938)
- Op. 57 Suite georgienne (Georgian Suite) for piano and strings (1938)
- Op. 57 Arrangement of Suite georgienne for 2 pianos.
- Op. 57 Suite georgienne, version for 1 piano 4 hands.
- Op. 57 / WoO Dialogue, arrangement of second movement of Georgian Suite for piano solo (1952)
- Op. 58 Sonatina for timpani and piano (1939)
- Op. 36b Histoire de la petite Thérèse de l'enfant Jésus (The Story of Little Therese of Infant Jesus), 13 short pieces for piano.
- Op. 37/2 Mystère, arrangement for cello and piano
- Op. 37/3c Training, piano reduction by Tcherepnin (1930)
- Op. 38 12 Preludes (Violoncelle bien tempéré) (The Well-Tempered Cello) for cello and piano (1925–26)
- Op. 39 Message, piano solo (1926)
- Op. 39b Voeux (Wishes), piano solo (1926)
- Op. 63 Sonatine sportive for alto saxophone or bassoon and piano (1939)
- Op. 63 Sonatine sportive, version for cello and piano (1939)
- Op. posth. Sonata in One Movement for clarinet and piano (1939)
- Op. 64 Andante for tuba or bass trombone and piano (1939)
- Op. 65 Pour Petits et Grands (For Young and Old), 12 piano pieces of medium difficulty (1940)
- Op. 66 Chant et refrain (Song and Refrain), piano solo (1940)
- Op. 81 Expressions, piano solo (1951)
- Op. 82 Songs Without Words, piano solo (1951)
  1. Elegy
  2. Rondel
  3. Enigma
  4. The Juggler
  5. Hymn to Our Lady
- Op. 84 Songs and Dances for Cello and Piano (1953)
- Op. 85 12 Preludes for piano (1952–53)
- Op. 95 Cycle of 7 Chinese Folksongs for bass or other voices and piano (1962). In Chinese and English.
- Op. 96 Piano Concerto No. 5 (1963), original version for large orchestra.
- Op. 96 Piano Concerto No. 5 (1963), version for piano and small orchestra.
- Op. 96 Arrangement of Piano Concerto No. 5 for 2 pianos

=== Quartet ===
- Op. 36 String Quartet No. 1 (Love Offering of St. Theresa) (1922)
- Op. 40 String Quartet No. 2 (1926)
- Op. 60 Quartet for 4 flutes (1939)

=== Ballet ===
- Op. 37/3b Training, ballet in one scene (1922)
- Op. 32 Ajanta's Frescoes, ballet in four scenes (1923)
- Op. 55 Trepak, ballet in three scenes (with Serge Sudeikin) (1937)
- Op. 79 La Femme et son ombre (The Woman and her Shadow), ballet (1948)
- Op. 79a Japanese Suite, orchestral suite from the ballet The Woman and her Shadow (1948)
- Op. 87 Suite for Orchestra (1953), suite for orchestra comprising first three movements from the ballet Le Gouffre.
- Op. 87b Le Gouffre (The Abyss), ballet (1949)
- Op. 92 Georgiana (1958–59), suite for orchestra from the ballet Chota Rostaveli (1946)
- Op. posth. Suite de ballet, arrangement after the second act of the ballet Chota Rostaveli for 2 pianos and percussion (1946)

=== Other ===
- Op. 35 Ol-Ol, opera in five scenes (1930)
- Op. 36a Musica Sacra (1973). Arrangement (with Kurt Redel) for string orchestra from String Quartet No. 1 (1922)
- Op. 37/3 Training version for oboe and bassoon with chamber orchestra
- Op. 41 Magna Mater (1926–27)
- (Op. 42) Scherzo for percussion ensemble, from Symphony No. 1.
- Op. 45 Die Hochzeit der Sobeide (The Wedding of Sobeide), opera in three scenes (1928–30). In German.
- Op. 45a Festmusik (Celebration Music), suite from the opera Die Hochzeit der Sobeide (1930)
- Op. 58 Sonatina, arranged for timpani and orchestra (1954)
- Op. 58 Sonatina for timpani and band (1963)
- Op. 62 March for 3 trumpets in B♭ (1939)
- Op. 67 Romantic Overture (1942)
- Op. 68 2 Mélodies for soprano or tenor and piano (1946)
- Op. 69 Evocation (Enfance do Saint-Nino) (The Childhood of Saint Nino) (1944)
- Op. 70 Mouvement perpetuel for Violin and Piano (1944)
- Op. 71 7 Songs on Chinese Poems for soprano or tenor and piano (1945). Text in Chinese, Russian and English.
- Op. 72 The Nymph and the Farmer, opera in two scenes (1952). In French, German or English.
- Op. 73 Les Douze (The Twelve) for narrator and small orchestra (1945). Text in Russian, French, German or English.
- Op. 73 Les Douze, version for narrator and piano.
- Op. 74 Nativity Play, cantata for 2 sopranos, tenor, bass, chorus (optional), string orchestra and percussion (1945). Text in English, French, German or Russian.
- Op. 74 Nativity Play, version for soloists, chorus, string orchestra and percussion.
- Op. 74 Nativity Play, version for voice and piano.
- Op. 75 Le Monde en vitrine (Showcase), piano solo (1946)
- Op. 76 Suite for cello solo (1946)
- Op. 77 Symphony No. 2 (1946–51)
- Op. 78 Piano Concerto No. 4 (Fantasy) (1947)
- Op. 78 Arrangement of Piano Concerto No. 4 for 2 pianos.
- Op. 80 Symphonic March, original version for orchestra (1951)
- Op. 80 Symphonic March, version for band (1954)
- Op. 83 Symphony No. 3 (1951)
  1. Incorporating music from the ballet Dionys (1940)
  2. Incorporating music from the ballet Atlantide (1943)
  3. Incorporating music from the ballet Le Vendeur des papillons (c.1945)
  4. Incorporating music from the ballet Dionys (1940)
- Op. 86 Concerto for Harmonica and Orchestra (1953)
- Op. 86 Arrangement of Concerto for harmonica and piano.
- Op. 87b Rondo, arrangement for 2 pianos of final movement of Suite for Orchestra (1952)
- Op. 88 8 Pieces for Piano (1954–55)
  1. Meditation
  2. Intermezzo
  3. No. 3 Reverie
  4. No. 4 Impromptu
  5. No. 5 Invocation
  6. No. 6 The Chase
  7. No. 7 Etude
  8. No. 8 Burlesque
- Op. 89 The Lost Flute, for narrator and orchestra (1954)
- Op. 90 Divertimento (1955–57)
- Op. 91 Symphony No. 4 (1957)
- Op. 93 Symphonisches Gebet (Symphonic Prayer) (1959)
- Op. 94 Piano Sonata No. 2 (1961?)
- Op. 97 Serenade for Strings (1964)
- Op. 98 Vom Spass und Ernst (Of Things Light and Earnest), folksong cantata for contralto or bass and string orchestra (1964). Text in Russian, German or English.
- Op. 99 Piano Concerto No. 6 (1965)
- Op. 99 Arrangement of Piano Concerto No. 6 for 2 pianos.
- Op. 100 Suite for harpsichord (1966)
- Op. 101 Sonata da Chiesa for viola da gamba and organ (1966)
- Op. 101 Sonata da Chiesa, version for viola da gamba, string quintet, flute and cembalo.
- Op. 102 Mass for 3 Equal Voices (2 sopranos and alto, a cappella) (1966)
- Op. 103 6 Liturgical Chants for Mixed Chorus a cappella (1967)
  1. Cherubim song
  2. O My God
  3. Light So Tender
  4. Prayer to the Holy Spirit
  5. Transfiguration
  6. Alleluia
- Op. 104 4 Russian Folksongs for Mixed Chorus a cappella (1967)
  1. Hills
  2. Shali-Vali
  3. Complaint
  4. Nonsense Song
- Op. 105 Brass quintet (1970)
- Op. 106 Russian Sketches, for youth orchestra (1971)
- Op. 106 Russian Sketches, version for band (1977)
- Op. 107 Woodwind quintet (1976)
- Op. 108 (posth.) Duo for 2 Flutes (1977)
- Op. 109 Opivochki (Little Dregs), 39 miscellaneous short pieces for piano in various styles (1975–77)

=== No Opus ===
- WoO [Work without Opus] Old Saint Petersburg, waltz for piano (1917)
- WoO Ballade for piano (1917)
- WoO A Contented Man, song for bass and piano (1918)
- WoO Ode for cello and piano (1919)
- WoO Episodes – Priskaski (Fleas), 12 simple pieces for piano (1912–20)
- WoO Étude de concert (Concert Etude) for piano (1920)
- WoO Romance for violin and small orchestra (1922)
- WoO Romance for violin and piano (1922)
- WoO Pour la paix en Orient (For Peace in the Orient), piano solo (1926) Originally intended as one movement of Voeux.
- WoO / Op. posth. Study for soprano or tenor and piano (1927). Former title: Vocalise-Étude for voice.
- WoO Die Heirate (The Marriage), opera in two scenes; music of first scene by Modest Moussorgsky (1863); music of second scene by Tcherepnin (1934–35). Orchestrations by Tcherepnin. In German or Russian.
- WoO Autour des montagnes russes (Riding the Roller Coaster), piano solo (1937)
- WoO La Legende de Razin (The Legend of Razin), ballet in three scenes (1940–41). Original title Stenka Razin.
- WoO La Foire do Sorotchinski (Sorochinsky Fair), ballet with music by Modest Moussorgsky, completed and orchestrated by Tcherepnin (1940)
- WoO Dionys, Ballet mythologique (1940). Incorporated into Symphony No. 3, movements 1 and 4.
- WoO Suite populaire russe for small orchestra (1941)
- WoO Badinage, piano solo (1941)
- WoO Vivre d'amour (Hymn of Love), lyric cantata for soloists, chorus and orchestra (1942). Text in English and French.
- WoO Atlantide, ballet (1943). Incorporated into Symphony No. 3, movement 2.
- WoO Valse orientale for piano, flute, xylophone and strings (c.1943)
- WoO Polka, original version for piano solo (1944)
- WoO Le Vendeur des papillons (The Butterfly Salesman), ballet (c.1945). Incorporated into Symphony No. 3, movement 3.
- WoO 2 Songs for soprano or tenor and piano (1945)
- WoO Le Déjeuner sur l'herbe (Picnic on the Grass), ballet based on the music of Joseph Lanner (1945–46)
- WoO Rondo à la russe, piano solo (1946)
- WoO L'Écolier paresseux (The Lazy Scholar), folksong for voice and piano (c.1947)
- WoO J'avais mal ... (I Was Sick ... ), folksong for voice and piano (c.1947)
- WoO La Quatrième (The Fourth Republic), piano solo (1948–49)
- WoO La Colline des phantômes (The Hill of Phantoms) ballet (1953)
- WoO Pastoral, arrangement for piano solo from The Lost Flute (1955)
- WoO Polka, version for orchestra (1956) after original for piano (1944)
- WoO 17 Piano Pieces for Beginners (1954–57)
- WoO Exploring the Piano: 12 duets for beginner and teacher–pianist (1958)
- WoO Trio for flute, violin and cello (1960)
- WoO Fanfare for brass ensemble and percussion (1961)
- WoO Partita for accordion (1961)
- WoO Processional and Recessional for organ (1962)
- WoO Tzigane for accordion (1966)
- WoO Invention for accordion (1967)
- WoO The Story of Ivan the Fool (1968), music for a radio play, for narrator, vocal soloists, chorus, orchestra and electronic sound.
- WoO Ascension, piano solo (1969)
- WoO Ein Kleines Lied (A Little Song) for soprano or tenor and piano (1970)
- WoO Baptism Cantata for children's chorus, solo voice, recorders, flutes, strings, organ, and optional participation of the congregation (1972)
- WoO 4 Caprices diatoniques for harp or Celtic harp (1973)
- WoO Two Pieces for Children, piano solo (1976)
  1. Indian Trail
  2. Celebration
- Transcription for piano of 19th Century Russian church choir music by Bortniansky, Degtiareff and Berezovsky (1920)
- Arrangement for piano of Domenico Zipoli's organ piece All'Offertorio (1920)
- Free adaptation of Anton Rubinstein's Nocturne in F major, Op. 44 No. 5, piano solo (1920)
- Arrangement for piano of Chant hindou (Hindu Song) from Nikolai Rimsky-Korsakov's opera Sadko (1922)
- Music for the TV film The Unknown India (1936)
- 12 Favorite Pieces for Children from the Russian Masters, arranged for piano (1937)
- Music for a TV production of Swan Lake (1948)
- Music for the TV film The Cadets' Ball (1948)
- Music for the play King Lear (1950)
- Music for the play Blood Wedding (1951)
- Music for the play Fenelon (1951)
- Music for the TV film Crisis in Suez (1961)
- Music for the TV film Catch the Graf Spee (1962)
- Music for the TV film Retreat from Arnhem (1962)
- Music for the TV film Attack on Singapore (1963)

== Recordings ==
Recordings of compositions by Alexander Tcherepnin

== Documents ==
Letters by Alexander Tcherepnin held by the State Archives Leipzig, company archives of the music publishing house C. F. Peters (Leipzig)
