= Richard Taruskin =

American musicologist and critic (1945–2022)

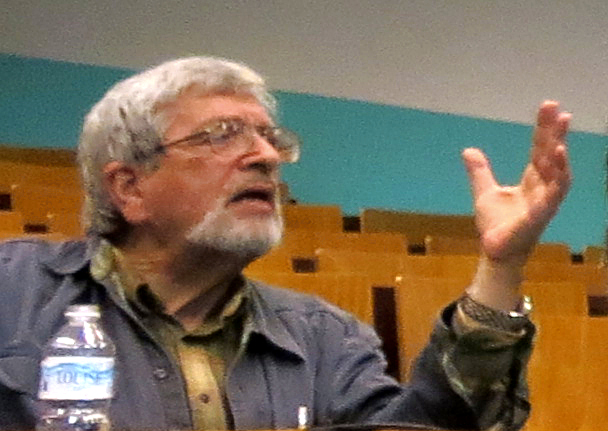
- Taruskin in 2014
- Born: Richard Filler Taruskin; April 2, 1945; New York City, U.S.
- Died: July 1, 2022 (aged 77); Oakland, California, U.S.
- Spouse: Cathy Roebuck (m. 1984)
- Children: 2
- Awards: Noah Greenberg Award; Kyoto Prize in Arts and Philosophy

Academic background
- Education: Columbia University (BA, MA, PhD)

Academic work
- Discipline: Russian music
- Institutions: UC Berkeley; Columbia University
- Notable works: Oxford History of Western Music

Richard Taruskin (April 2, 1945 – July 1, 2022) was an American musicologist and music critic. His analyses combined cultural, historical, political, and sociological perspectives with rigorous source study and sparked debate. He focused on 18th-to-21st-century Russian music but also researched 15th- and 20th-century music, analysis, modernism, musical nationalism, and performance theory. He is best known for the six-volume Oxford History of Western Music. His honors include the American Musicological Society's first Noah Greenberg Award (1978) and the Kyoto Prize in Arts and Philosophy (Music, 2017).

== Life and work ==
=== New York ===
==== Early life as a musician–scholar ====
Richard Filler Taruskin, born on April 2, 1945 in New York City, was raised in an intellectual family by onetime piano teacher Beatrice (née Filler) and lawyer and amateur violinist Benjamin Taruskin, with whom he enjoyed Metropolitan Opera radio broadcasts. His grandparents were Jewish immigrants from then Russia, later Lithuania and Ukraine. To play piano trios with his parents, he studied cello, including at the High School of Music & Art in Manhattan. While Italian opera and rock music bored him, Adlai Stevenson II's liberalism engaged and durably shaped him.

He received his degrees (B.A. magna cum laude, 1965; M.A., 1968; Ph.D. historical musicology, 1976) from Columbia University, where he directed the Collegium Musicum and, from the late 1970s to the late 1980s, played viola da gamba with the Aulos Ensemble. In 1978, he received the first Noah Greenberg Award from the American Musicological Society (AMS) for his research into and recorded performance of Johannes Ockeghem's Missa prolationum.

==== Russian music ====
During his Ph.D., he worked with Paul Henry Lang, a pioneer of sociocultural music history in Music in Western Civilization. Recordings of unfamiliar Russian operas from a family member who stayed behind after the Russian Revolution caught his interest, which he deepened during a Fulbright year in Moscow studying Russian language, music, and sociopolitical history. He taught at Columbia from 1975 to 1986 and received the AMS's Alfred Einstein Award in 1980.

He explored Igor Stravinsky's archives at the New York Public Library in the 1980s. Following his 1981 debut, Opera and Drama in Russia as Preached and Practiced in the 1860s, he signed for a Russian opera history for Cambridge University Press, which went unfulfilled, He married Cathy Roebuck in 1984, and they had two children. Starting in the mid-1980s, he wrote for lay audiences, including The New York Times readers. The Times was where he "learned to write", he recalled, and his point of entry had been editor James R. Oestreich, initially through Opus magazine.

=== California ===
In 1986, he joined University of California, Berkeley, and was the Class of 1955 Chair. He received the Royal Musical Association's Dent Medal (1987) and the 1988 Deems Taylor Award from the American Society of Composers, Authors and Publishers.

==== Critical or polemical work ====
His sharp, often critical or polemical work, famed in and read beyond academic musicology, not only emphasized composers of Eastern European heritage, but also aimed to dispel the idea of music's sociopolitical autonomy, to challenge lore-laden progress narratives, and to historicize historicism. Many of his articles were collected in books such as Text and Act, a volume featuring his influential critique of historically informed performance, as well as On Russian Music and The Danger of Music and Other Anti-Utopian Essays. He targeted Elliott Carter, Carl Orff, and Sergei Prokofiev, and helped redeem Pyotr Ilyich Tchaikovsky.

"The Dark Side of the Moon" (The New Republic, 1988) called fascism's legacy an "inherent" facet of modernism's "anti-democratic" legacy, shown by claims of Stravinsky's sympathy for Benito Mussolini, Arnold Schoenberg's "fealty" to social stratification, and Anton Webern's welcoming the Nazis to Vienna. The reprint (Danger of Music, 2009) called fascism's legacy an "inseparable" facet of "lofty" modernism's legacy. In 2013, musicologist Ben Earle similarly called modernism "essentially anti-liberal".

"Et in Arcadia Ego; or, I Didn't Know I Was Such a Pessimist until I Wrote This Thing" (1989 lecture; Danger of Music, 2009 with comment) bucks what he saw as the standard narrative history of 19th-to-20th-century classical music: linear progress toward autonomy. It typified his quasi-straw men against lore, and he commented in 2008 that he found it "schematic and insufficiently nuanced", pointing its use as a "general framework" for his more detailed 2005 History.

"The Pastness of the Present" (1988) held that claims of direct connection to the past can mask the present. Conversely, Stravinsky and the Russian Traditions: A Biography of the Works through Mavra (1996) showed Stravinsky's extensive use of Russian folk music and the historical reasons for its lack of acknowledgment.

"No Ear for Music: The Scary Purity of John Cage" (New Republic, 1993) argued that stiff rigidity underlaid Cage's zaniness and identification with Erik Satie. In 1997, he received the AMS's Otto Kinkeldey Award and was elected to the American Philosophical Society in 1998. His essays continued to treat cultural, political, and social aspects of music. Amid the September 11 attacks in 2003, a production of John Adams' opera The Death of Klinghoffer (1991) was cancelled, and Taruskin wrote that it played on jejune fantasies of terrorism. (Note: See, for example, "The Klinghoffer Controversy" in Thomas May, ed., The John Adams Reader (Amadeus Press, 2006), pp. 297–339; Taruskin's original 2001 The New York Times article is reprinted there and, with a lengthy postscript, in The Danger of Music.)

==== History ====
The Oxford History of Western Music (2005), his sole fulfilled solo commission, was envisioned as a college text. Expanding on music history lectures he had given since the late 1960s, it filled six volumes and was billed as an authoritative, synoptic history, framed by the looming end of the "literate tradition". It was described as both bold and conceptually old. It relied on (sometimes extensive) musical analysis and narrative history but aimed to center discourses and reception in "attempt at a true history".

The preface, a polemic against "neo-Hegelian art history" like Carl Dahlhaus's "pseudo-dialectical" Foundations of Music History, aimed to probe "social and political affairs" for "actual causes of aesthetic and stylistic evolution". It called the work of modernist theorist Theodor W. Adorno "preposterously overrated" and new musicology Adornoian.

The first volume, covering Music from the Earliest Notations to the Sixteenth Century, told a story "both authoritative and transporting" based on "facts and impressions from histories, visual art and architecture", and was called perhaps "the best overall introduction to 'early music' available" upon his death.

The fourth volume saw expressionist music as extending late Romantic "maximalism" and reperiodized 20th-century classical music's distinct stylistic shift from c. 1910 to the objectivity of 1920s neoclassicism (specifically Stravinsky's nonemotive Octet). With José Ortega y Gasset's "dehumanization" concept, it distinguished French from German forms of musical modernism and tied musical modernism (and Ortega) to fascism, and Stravinsky to Mussolini.

==== Later career, retirement, and death ====
In 2006, he received second Deems Taylor and Otto Kinkeldey awards, and provided direct and useful feedback on The Rest Is Noise to music critic Alex Ross, who took from him the idea that "love should never devolve into worship". In 2012, Princeton University held a conference, After the End of Music History, in his honor.

He had coronary artery bypass surgery and retired from Berkeley in 2014, staying nearby in El Cerrito. In 2017, he received the Kyoto Prize in Arts and Philosophy in Music. He died from esophageal cancer at a hospital in Oakland, California, on July 1, 2022, aged 77.

== Publications ==
=== Books ===
- Taruskin, Richard (1981). Opera and Drama in Russia: As Preached and Practiced in the 1860s. Ann Arbor: UMI Research Press. ISBN 978-0-8357-1245-3. Republished in 1993, Rochester: University of Rochester Press
- ——; Weiss, Piero, eds. (1984). Music in the Western World: A History in Documents. New York: Schirmer Books. ISBN 978-0-02-872900-8.
- —— (1993). Musorgsky: Eight Essays and an Epilogue. Princeton: Princeton University Press. doi:10.2307/j.ctv18zhdkh. ISBN 978-0-691-01623-8. JSTOR j.ctv18zhdkh. S2CID 241012607.
- —— (1995). Text and Act: Essays on Music and Performance. Oxford: Oxford University Press. ISBN 978-0-19-535743-1.
- —— (1996). Stravinsky and the Russian Traditions: A Biography of the Works through Mavra [2 volumes]. Berkeley: University of California Press. ISBN 978-0-520-07099-8.
- —— (1997). Defining Russia Musically: Historical and Hermeneutical Essays. Princeton: Princeton University Press. doi:10.2307/j.ctv15r5dmx. ISBN 978-0-691-01156-1. JSTOR j.ctv15r5dmx. S2CID 193710371.
- —— (2005). Oxford History of Western Music [6 volumes]. Oxford: Oxford University Press.
  - ——. Music from the Earliest Notations to the Sixteenth Century. Vol. 1. ISBN 978-0-19-522270-8.
  - ——. Music in the Seventeenth and Eighteenth Centuries. Vol. 2. ISBN 978-0-19-522271-5.
  - ——. Music in the Nineteenth Century. Vol. 3. ISBN 978-0-19-522272-2.
  - ——. Music in the Early Twentieth Century. Vol. 4. ISBN 978-0-19-522273-9.
  - ——. Music in the Late Twentieth Century. Vol. 5. ISBN 978-0-19-522274-6.
  - ——. Resources: Chronology, Bibliography, Master Index. Vol. 6. ISBN 978-0-19-522275-3.
- —— (2008). The Danger of Music and Other Anti-Utopian Essays. Berkeley: University of California Press. ISBN 978-0-520-26805-0.
- —— (2008). On Russian Music. Berkeley: University of California Press. ISBN 978-0-520-26806-7. JSTOR 10.1525/j.ctt1ppqnq.
- Karlinsky, Simon (2013). ——; Karlinsky, Simon; Hughes, Robert P.; Koster, Thomas A. (eds.). Freedom from Violence and Lies: Essays on Russian Poetry and Music (PDF). Boston: Academic Studies Press. doi:10.2307/j.ctt1zxsk34. ISBN 978-1-61811-158-6. JSTOR j.ctt1zxsk34.
- ——; Allanbrook, Wye Jamison; Smart, Mary Ann, eds. (2014). The Secular Commedia: Comic Mimesis in Late Eighteenth-Century Music. Berkeley: University of California Press. ISBN 978-0-520-27407-5.
- —— (2016). Russian Music at Home and Abroad: New Essays. Berkeley: University of California Press. ISBN 978-0-520-28809-6. JSTOR 10.1525/j.ctt1dnncjs.
- —— (2020). Cursed Questions: On Music and Its Social Practices. Berkeley: University of California Press. ISBN 978-0-520-34429-7.
- —— (2023). Musical Lives and Times Examined: Keynotes and Clippings, 2006-2019. Berkeley: University of California Press. ISBN 978-0-520-39200-7.

=== Chapters ===
- Taruskin, Richard (1982). "The Musicologist and the Performer". In Holoman, D. Kern; Palisca, Claude V. (eds.). Musicology in the 1980s: Methods, Goals, Opportunities. New York: Da Capo Press. pp. 107–117. ISBN 978-0-306-76188-1.
- —— (1982). "'Little Star': an Etude in the Folk Style". In Brown, Malcolm Hamrick (ed.). Musorgsky, in Memoriam, 1881–1981. Ann Arbor: UMI Research Press. pp. 57–84. ISBN 978-0-8357-1295-8.
- —— (1983). "Handel, Shakespeare, and Musorgksy: The Sources and Limits of Russian Musical Realism". Music and Language. Studies in the history of music. Vol. 1. New York: Broude Bros. pp. 247–268. ISBN 978-0-8450-7401-5.
- —— (1984). ""The Present in the Past": Russian Opera and Russian Historiography, ca. 1870". In Brown, Malcolm Hamrick (ed.). Russian and Soviet Music: Essays for Boris Schwarz. Ann Arbor: UMI Research Press. pp. 77–146. ISBN 978-0-8357-1295-8.
- —— (1984). "The Rite Revisited: the Idea and the Sources of its Scenario". In Hatch, Christopher; Strainchamps, Edmond; Maniates, Maria Rika (eds.). Music and Civilization: Essays in Honor of Paul Henry Lang. New York: W. W. Norton. pp. 183–202. ISBN 978-0-393-01677-2.
- —— (1985). "Serov and Musorgsky". In Brown, Malcolm Hamrick; Wiley, Roland John (eds.). Slavonic and Western Music: Essays for Gerald Abraham. Ann Arbor: UMI Research Press. pp. 139–161. ISBN 978-0-8357-1594-2.
- —— (1986) [1982]. "From Subject to Style: Stravinsky and the Painters". In Pasler, Jann (ed.). Confronting Stravinsky: Man, Musician, and Modernist. Berkeley: University of California Press. pp. 16–38. ISBN 978-0-520-05403-5.
- —— (1987). "Stravinsky's "Rejoicing Discovery" and what it Meant: in Defense of his Notorious Text Setting". In Haimo, Ethan; Johnson, Paul (eds.). Stravinsky Retrospectives. Lincoln: University of Nebraska Press. pp. 162–200. ISBN 978-0-8032-7301-6.
- —— (1988). "The Pastness of the Present and the Presence of the Past". In Kenyon, Nicholas (ed.). Authenticity and Early Music: A Symposium. Oxford: Oxford University Press. pp. 137–210. ISBN 978-0-19-816152-3.
- —— (1995). "The Traditional Revisited: Stravinsky's Requiem Canticles as Russian Music". In Hatch, Christopher; Bernstein, David W. (eds.). Music Theory and the Exploration of the Past. Chicago: Chicago University Press. pp. 525–550. ISBN 978-0-226-31902-5.
- —— (1995). "From Fairy Tale to Opera in Four Moves (Not so Simple)". In Bauman, Thomas; McClymonds, Marita Petzoldt (eds.). Opera and the Enlightenment. Cambridge: Cambridge University Press. pp. 299–307. ISBN 978-0-521-46172-6.
- —— (1995). "Public Lies and Unspeakable Truth: Interpreting Shostakovich's Fifth Symphony". In Fanning, David (ed.). Shostakovich Studies. Cambridge: Cambridge University Press. pp. 17–56. doi:10.1017/CBO9780511551406.002. ISBN 978-0-511-55140-6.

=== Articles ===
- Taruskin, Richard (July 1970). "Realism as Preached and Practiced: The Russian Opera Dialogue". The Musical Quarterly. 56 (3). Oxford University Press: 431–454. doi:10.1093/mq/LVI.3.431. JSTOR 741247.
- —— (November 1977). "Glinka's Ambiguous Legacy and the Birth Pangs of Russian Opera". 19th-Century Music. 1 (2). University of California Press: 142–162. doi:10.2307/746475. JSTOR 746475.
- —— (Spring 1979). "Opera and Drama in Russia: The Case of Serov's "Judith"". Journal of the American Musicological Society. 32 (1). University of California Press: 74–117. doi:10.2307/831269. JSTOR 831269.
- —— (Autumn 1980). "Russian Folk Melodies in "The Rite of Spring"". Journal of the American Musicological Society. 33 (3). University of California Press: 501–543. doi:10.2307/831304. JSTOR 831304.
- —— (June 1982). "On Letting the Music Speak for Itself: some Reflections on Musicology and Performance". The Journal of Musicology. 1 (3). University of California Press: 338–349. doi:10.2307/763881. JSTOR 763881.
- —— (Spring 1983). "How the Acorn Took Root: A Tale of Russia". 19th-Century Music. 6 (3). University of California Press: 189–212. doi:10.2307/746585. JSTOR 746585.
- —— (Autumn 1984). "Some Thoughts on the History and Historiography of Russian Music". The Journal of Musicology. 3 (4). University of California Press: 321–339. doi:10.2307/763585. JSTOR 763585.
- —— (Autumn 1984). "Musorgsky vs. Musorgsky: The Versions of "Boris Godunov"". 19th-Century Music. 8 (2). University of California Press: 91–118, 241–256. doi:10.2307/746756. JSTOR 746756.
- —— (Spring 1985). "Chernomor to Kashchei: Harmonic Sorcery; Or, Stravinsky's "Angle"". Journal of the American Musicological Society. 38 (1). University of California Press: 72–142. doi:10.2307/831550. JSTOR 831550.
- —— (Summer 1986). "Antoine Busnoys and the "L'Homme armé" Tradition". Journal of the American Musicological Society. 39 (2). University of California Press: 255–293. doi:10.2307/831531. JSTOR 831531.
- —— (Spring 1987). "Chez Pétrouchka: Harmony and Tonality "chez" Stravinsky". 19th-Century Music. 10 (3). University of California Press: 265–286. doi:10.2307/746439. JSTOR 746439.
- —— (Spring 1989). "Resisting the Ninth". 19th-Century Music. 12 (3). University of California Press: 241–256. doi:10.2307/746505. JSTOR 746505.
- —— (June 15, 1989). "'Jews and Geniuses': An Exchange". The New York Review of Books.
- —— (May 1992). "Tradition and Authority". Early Music. 20 (2). Oxford University Press: 311–314+317–320+323–325. doi:10.1093/earlyj/XX.2.311. JSTOR 3127887.
- —— (November 1992). "'Entoiling the Falconet': Russian Musical Orientalism in Context". Cambridge Opera Journal. 4 (3). Cambridge University Press: 253–280. doi:10.1017/S0954586700003797. JSTOR 823694. S2CID 190722625.
- —— (1995). "Busnoys and Chaikovsky". International Journal of Musicology. 4, A Birthday Offering for George Perle: 111–137. JSTOR 24617753.
- —— (January 1995). "A Myth of the Twentieth Century: The Rite of Spring, the Tradition of the New, and the Myth Itself". Modernism/modernity. 2 (1). Johns Hopkins University Press: 1–26. doi:10.1353/mod.1995.0008. S2CID 145160261.
- —— (2006). "The Birth of Contemporary Russia out of the Spirit of Russian Music". Muzikologija. 6 (6): 63–76. doi:10.2298/MUZ0606063T.
- —— (2006). "Is There a Baby in the Bathwater? (Part I)". Archiv für Musikwissenschaft. 63 (3). Franz Steiner Verlag: 163–185. JSTOR 25162364.
- —— (2006). "Is There a Baby in the Bathwater? (Part II)". Archiv für Musikwissenschaft. 63 (4). Franz Steiner Verlag: 309–327. JSTOR 25162374.
- —— (December 9, 2001). "MUSIC; Music's Dangers And The Case For Control". The New York Times.
- —— (September 2006). "Why You Cannot Leave Bartók Out". Studia Musicologica Academiae Scientiarum Hungaricae. T. 47 (Fasc. 3/4): 265–277. JSTOR 25598260.
- —— (Spring 2009). "Afterword: Nicht blutbefleckt?". The Journal of Musicology. 26 (2). University of California Press: 274–284. doi:10.1525/jm.2009.26.2.274. JSTOR 10.1525/jm.2009.26.2.274.
- —— (Fall 2011). "Non-Nationalists and Other Nationalists". 19th-Century Music. 35 (2). University of California Press: 132–143. doi:10.1525/ncm.2011.35.2.132. JSTOR 10.1525/ncm.2011.35.2.132.
- —— (Spring 2014). "Agents and Causes and Ends, Oh My". The Journal of Musicology. 31 (2): 272–293. doi:10.1525/jm.2014.31.2.272. JSTOR 10.1525/jm.2014.31.2.272.

=== Review articles ===
- Taruskin, Richard (Spring 1989). "Resisting the Ninth". 19th-Century Music. 12 (3). University of California Press: 241–256. doi:10.2307/746505. JSTOR 746505.
- —— (Spring 1993). "Back to Whom? Neoclassicism as Ideology". 19th-Century Music. 16 (3). University of California Press: 286–302. doi:10.2307/746396. JSTOR 746396.
- —— (Spring 1993). "Revising Revision". Journal of the American Musicological Society. 46 (1). University of California Press: 114–138. doi:10.2307/831807. JSTOR 831807.
- —— (Spring 2004). "The poietic fallacy". The Musical Times. 145 (1886): 7–34. doi:10.2307/4149092. JSTOR 4149092.
- —— (Fall 2005). "Speed Bumps". 19th-Century Music. 29 (2). University of California Press: 185–207. doi:10.1525/ncm.2005.29.2.185. JSTOR 10.1525/ncm.2005.29.2.185.
- —— (October 22, 2007). "The Musical Mystique: Defending Classical Music against Its Devotees". The New Republic.
- —— (August 2009). "Material Gains: Assessing Susan McClary". Music & Letters. 90 (3). Oxford University Press: 453–467. doi:10.1093/ml/gcp049. JSTOR 40539033.

== See also ==
- Genealogy (philosophy)
- Historiography
- Schematic aesthetics in modern and contemporary philosophy
