= Pyotr Ilyich Tchaikovsky =

Russian composer (1840–1893)

- Пётр Ильич Чайковский
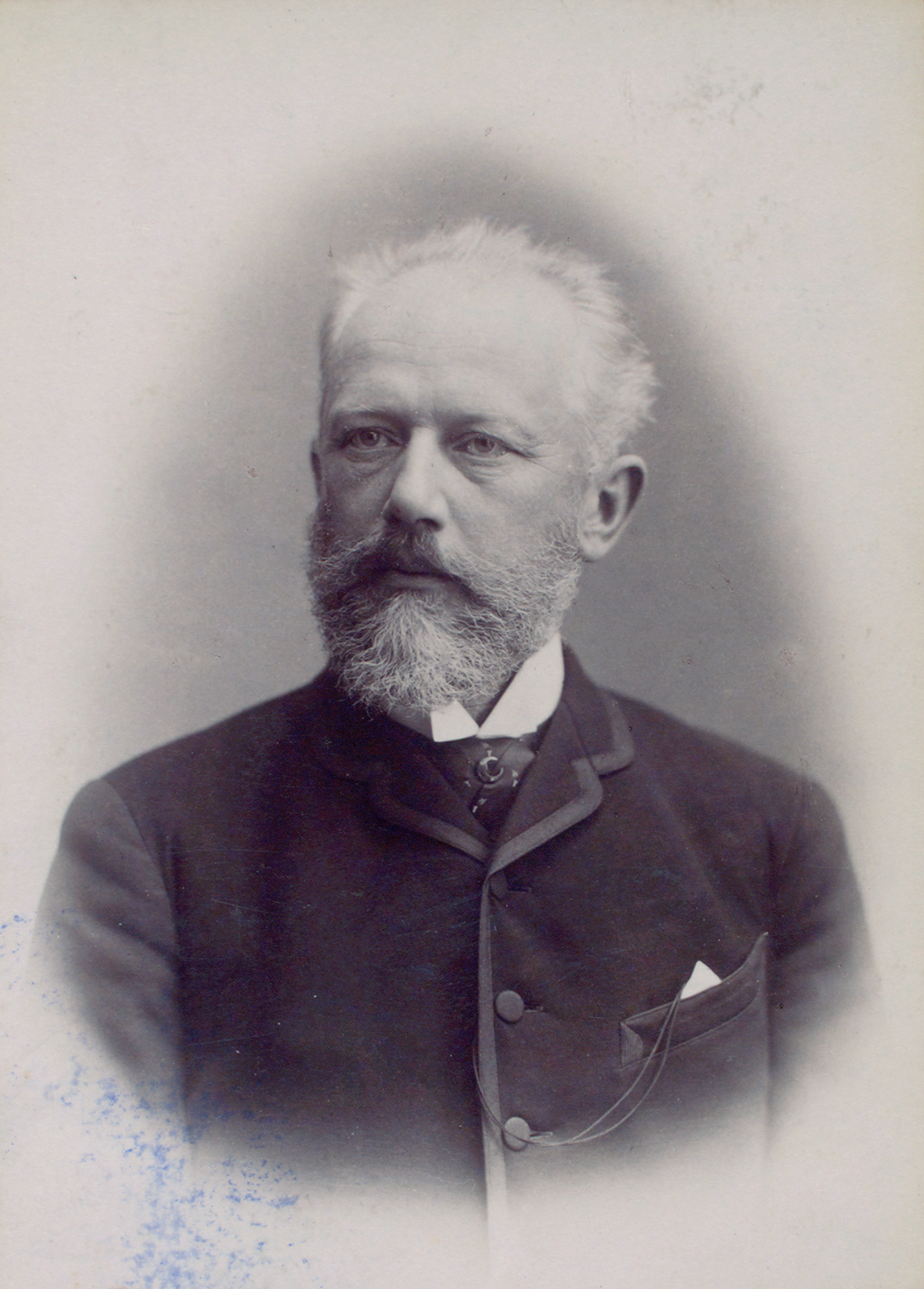
- Tchaikovsky, c. 1888
- Born: 7 May 1840; Votkinsk, Russia
- Died: 6 November 1893 (aged 53); Saint Petersburg, Russia
- Works: List of compositions

Signature
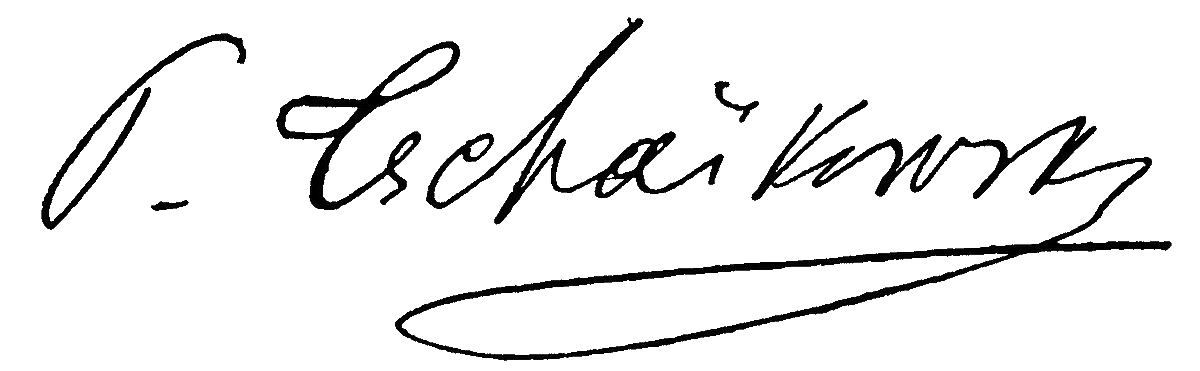
- (in Latin script) (in Cyrillic script)

Pyotr Ilyich Tchaikovsky (Note: This name follows East Slavic naming customs, Ilyich being the patronymic and Tchaikovsky being the family name. The native Cyrillic form is Пётр Ильич Чайковский, romanized as Pyotr Il'ich Chaykovskiy (IPA: [ˈpʲɵtr ɨˈlʲjitɕ tɕɪjˈkofskʲɪj]). It is often anglicized as Peter Ilich Tchaikovsky, e.g. by the Library of Congress.) (/tʃaɪˈkɒfski/ chy-KOF-skee; 7 May 1840 – 6 November 1893) (Note: Russia was still using Old Style dates in the 19th century, rendering his lifespan as 25 April 1840 – 25 October 1893. Some sources in the article report dates as Old Style rather than New Style.) was a Russian composer of the Romantic period. He was the first Russian composer whose music made a lasting impression internationally. Tchaikovsky wrote some of the most popular concert and theatrical music in the classical repertoire, including the 1812 Overture, his First Piano Concerto, the Violin Concerto, the Romeo and Juliet Overture-Fantasy, several symphonies, the opera Eugene Onegin, and the ballets Swan Lake, The Sleeping Beauty and The Nutcracker.

Although musically precocious, Tchaikovsky was educated for a career as a civil servant as there was little opportunity for a musical career in Russia at the time and no institutional music education system. When an opportunity for such an education arose, he entered the nascent Saint Petersburg Conservatory, from which he graduated in 1865. The formal Western-oriented teaching Tchaikovsky received there set him apart from composers of the contemporary nationalist movement embodied by the Russian composers of The Five, with whom his professional relationship was mixed.

Despite his many popular successes, Tchaikovsky's life was punctuated by personal crises and depression. Contributory factors included his early separation from his mother for boarding school followed by her early death, the death of his close friend and colleague Nikolai Rubinstein, his failed marriage to Antonina Miliukova, and the collapse of his 13-year association with the wealthy patroness Nadezhda von Meck. Tchaikovsky's homosexuality, which he kept private, has traditionally also been considered a major factor, though some scholars have downplayed its importance. His dedication of his Sixth Symphony to his nephew Vladimir Davydov and the feelings he expressed about Davydov in letters to others have been cited as evidence for romantic love between the two. Tchaikovsky's sudden death at the age of 53 is generally ascribed to cholera, but there is an ongoing debate as to whether cholera was indeed the cause and whether the death was intentional.

While his music has remained popular among audiences, critical opinions were initially mixed. Some Russians did not feel it sufficiently represented native musical values and expressed suspicion that Europeans accepted the music for its Western elements. In an apparent reinforcement of that claim, some Europeans lauded Tchaikovsky for offering music more substantive than exoticism and said he transcended the stereotypes of Russian classical music. Others dismissed Tchaikovsky's music as deficient because it did not stringently follow Western principles.

== Early life and education ==
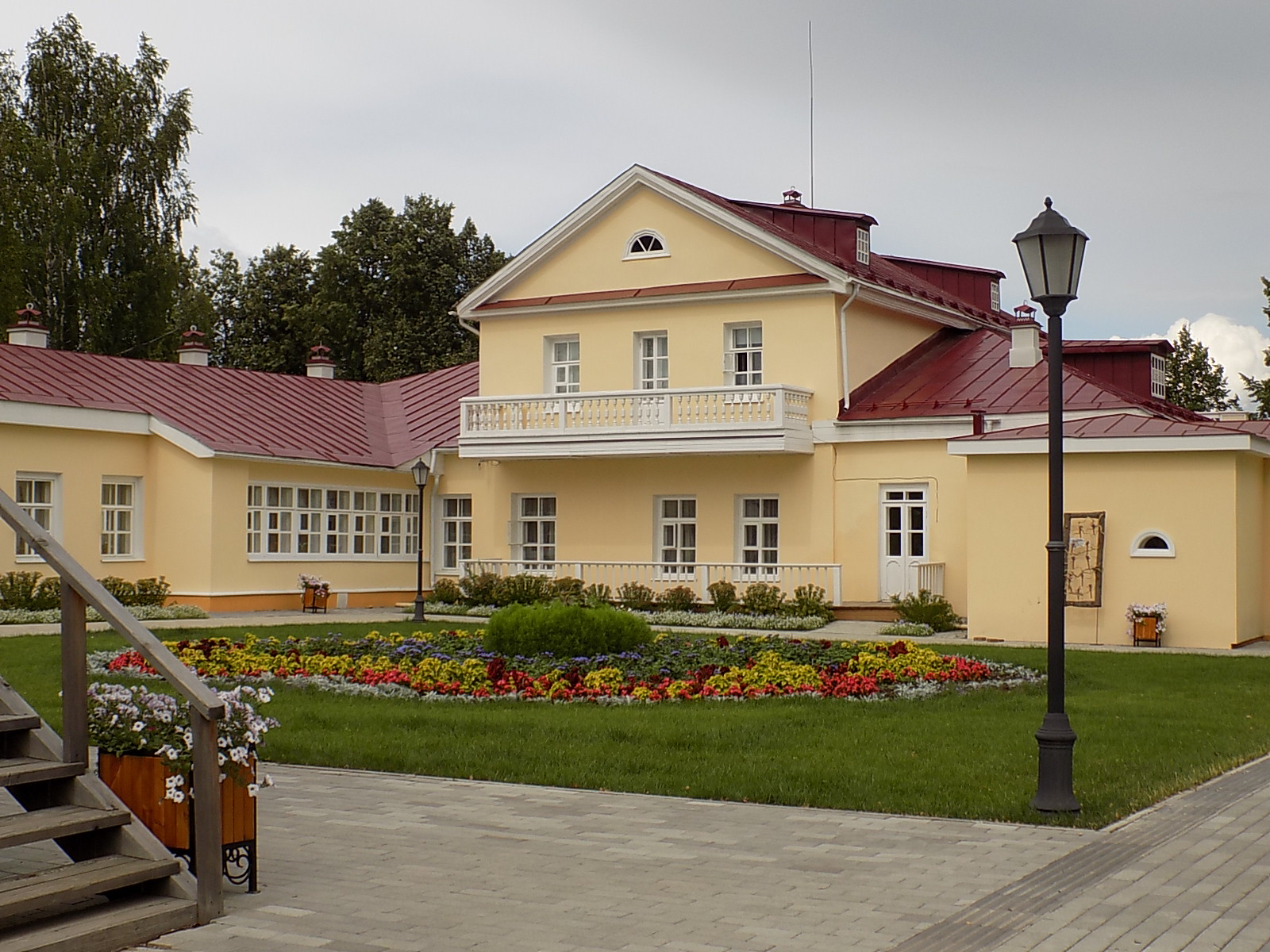
Tchaikovsky's birthplace in 1840 in Votkinsk, Russia, now a museum

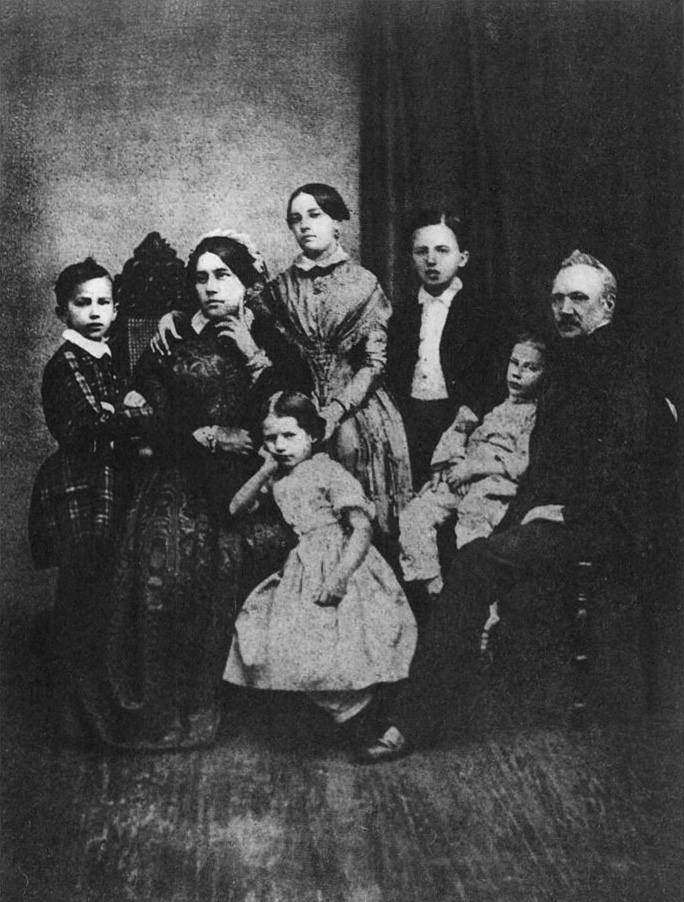
The Tchaikovsky family in 1848. Left to right: Pyotr, Alexandra Andreyevna (mother), Alexandra (sister), Zinaida, Nikolai, Ippolit, Ilya Petrovich (father)

Tchaikovsky was born on 7 May 1840 in Votkinsk, a small town in Vyatka Governorate during the Russian Empire in present-day Udmurtia near the banks of the Kama River. His father, Ilya Petrovich Tchaikovsky, served as a lieutenant colonel and engineer in the Department of Mines and managed the Ironworks in Kamsko-Votkinsk. His grandfather, Pyotr Fedorovich Tchaikovsky, was born in the village of Nikolaevka, Yekaterinoslav Governorate, Russian Empire in present-day Mykolaivka, Ukraine, and served first as a physician's assistant in the army and later as city governor of Glazov in Vyatka. His great-grandfather, a Zaporozhian Cossack named Fyodor Chaika, served in the Russian military at the Battle of Poltava in 1709.

Tchaikovsky's mother, Alexandra Andreyevna (née d'Assier), was the second of Ilya's three wives; his first wife died several years before Pyotr's birth. His mother was 18 years younger than her husband and was of French and German descent through her paternal side. Both Ilya and Alexandra were trained in the arts, including music. Of his six siblings, (Note: Tchaikovsky had four brothers (Nikolai, Ippolit, Anatoly, and Modest), a sister (Alexandra) and a half-sister (Zinaida) from his father's first marriage (Holden, 6, 13; Warrack, Tchaikovsky, 18). Anatoly later had a legal career, and Modest became a dramatist, librettist, and translator (Poznansky, Eyes, 2).) Tchaikovsky was close to his sister Alexandra and twin brothers Anatoly and Modest. Alexandra's marriage to Lev Davydov produced seven children and lent Tchaikovsky the only real family life he knew as an adult, especially during his years of wandering. One of those children, Vladimir Davydov, who went by the nickname "Bob", became very close to him.

In 1844, the family hired Fanny Dürbach, a 22-year-old French governess. Four-and-a-half-year-old Tchaikovsky was initially thought too young to study alongside his older brother Nikolai and a niece of the family. His insistence convinced Dürbach otherwise. By age six, he was fluent in French and German. Tchaikovsky also became attached to Dürbach; her affection for him reportedly counterbalanced his mother's coldness and emotional distance, though others assert that the mother doted on her son. Dürbach saved much of Tchaikovsky's work from this period, including his earliest known compositions, and became a source of several childhood anecdotes.

Tchaikovsky began piano lessons at the age of five with Maria Palchikova. Within three years he had become as adept at reading sheet music as his teacher. Tchaikovsky's parents, initially supportive, hired a tutor, bought an orchestrion, a form of barrel organ that could imitate elaborate orchestral effects, and encouraged his piano study for both aesthetic and practical reasons. In 1850, they sent Tchaikovsky to the Imperial School of Jurisprudence in Saint Petersburg. They had both graduated from institutes in Saint Petersburg and the School of Jurisprudence, which mainly served the lesser nobility, and thought that this education would prepare Tchaikovsky for a career as a civil servant. Regardless of talent, the only musical careers available in Russia at that time—except for the affluent aristocracy—were as a teacher in an academy or as an instrumentalist in one of the Imperial Theaters. Both were considered on the lowest rank of the social ladder, with individuals in them enjoying no more rights than peasants.

Tchaikovsky's father's income was also growing increasingly uncertain, so both parents may have wanted Tchaikovsky to become independent as soon as possible. As the minimum age for acceptance was 12 and Tchaikovsky was only 10 at the time, he was required to spend two years boarding at the Imperial School of Jurisprudence's preparatory school, 1,300 kilometres (800 mi) from his family. Once those two years had passed, Tchaikovsky transferred to the Imperial School of Jurisprudence to begin a seven-year course of study.

Tchaikovsky's early separation from his mother, despite the aforementioned alleged distant relationship, caused emotional trauma that lasted the rest of his life and was intensified by her death from cholera in 1854, when he was 14. (Note: Her death affected him so much that he could not inform Fanny Dürbach until two years later (Brown, The Early Years, 47; Holden, 23; Warrack, 29). More than 25 years after his loss, Tchaikovsky wrote to his patroness, Nadezhda von Meck, "Every moment of that appalling day is as vivid to me as though it were yesterday" (As quoted in Holden, 23).) The loss of his mother also prompted Tchaikovsky to make his first serious attempt at composition, a waltz in her memory. Tchaikovsky's father, who had also contracted cholera but recovered, sent him back to school immediately in the hope that classwork would occupy the boy's mind. Isolated, Tchaikovsky compensated with friendships with fellow students that became lifelong; these included Aleksey Apukhtin and Vladimir Gerard.

Music, while not an official priority at school, also bridged the gap between Tchaikovsky and his peers. They regularly attended the opera and Tchaikovsky improvised at the school's harmonium on themes he and his friends had sung during choir practice. "We were amused", Gerard later remembered, "but not imbued with any expectations of his future glory". Tchaikovsky also continued his piano studies with Franz Becker, an instrument manufacturer who made occasional visits to the school, but the results, according to the musicologist David Brown, were "negligible".

In 1855, Tchaikovsky's father funded private lessons with Rudolph Kündinger and questioned him about a musical career for his son. While impressed with the boy's talent, Kündinger said he saw nothing to suggest a future composer or performer. He later admitted that his assessment was also based on his own bad experiences as a musician in Russia and his unwillingness for Tchaikovsky to be treated likewise. Tchaikovsky was told to finish his course and then try for a post in the Ministry of Justice.

== Career ==
On 10 June 1859, the 19-year-old Tchaikovsky graduated as a titular counselor, a low rung on the civil service ladder. Appointed to the Ministry of Justice, he became a junior assistant within six months and a senior assistant two months after that. He remained a senior assistant for the rest of his three-year civil service career.

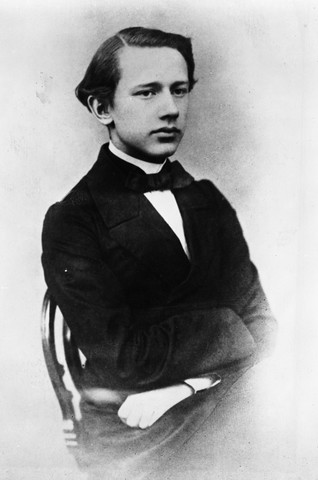
Tchaikovsky as a student at the St. Petersburg Conservatory in 1863

Meanwhile, the Russian Musical Society (RMS) was founded in 1859 by the Grand Duchess Elena Pavlovna (a German-born aunt of Tsar Alexander II) and her protégé, the pianist and composer Anton Rubinstein. Previous tsars and the aristocracy had focused almost exclusively on importing European talent. The aim of the RMS was to fulfill Alexander II's wish to foster native talent. It hosted a regular season of public concerts (previously held only during the six weeks of Lent when the Imperial Theaters were closed) and provided basic professional training in music. In 1861, Tchaikovsky attended RMS classes in music theory taught by Nikolai Zaremba at the Mikhailovsky Palace (now the Russian Museum). These classes were a precursor to the Saint Petersburg Conservatory, which opened in 1862. Tchaikovsky enrolled at the Conservatory as part of its premiere class. He studied harmony and counterpoint with Zaremba and instrumentation and composition with Rubinstein. He was awarded a silver medal for his thesis, a cantata on Friedrich Schiller's "Ode to Joy".

The Conservatory benefited Tchaikovsky in two ways. It transformed him into a musical professional, with tools to help him thrive as a composer, and the in-depth exposure to European principles and musical forms gave him a sense that his art was not exclusively native or foreign. This mindset became important in Tchaikovsky's reconciliation of Russian and Western European influences in his compositional style. He believed and attempted to show that both these aspects were "intertwined and mutually dependent". His efforts became both an inspiration and a starting point for other Russian composers to build their own individual styles.

Rubinstein was impressed by Tchaikovsky's musical talent on the whole and cited him as "a composer of genius" in his autobiography. He was less pleased with the more progressive tendencies of some of Tchaikovsky's student work. Nor did he change his opinion as Tchaikovsky's reputation grew. (Note: Tchaikovsky ascribed Rubinstein's coolness to a difference in musical temperaments. Rubinstein could have been jealous professionally of Tchaikovsky's greater impact as a composer. Homophobia might have been another factor (Poznansky, Eyes, 29).) (Note: An exception to Rubinstein's antipathy was the Serenade for Strings, which he declared "Tchaikovsky's best piece" when he heard it in rehearsal. "At last this St. Petersburg pundit, who had growled with such consistent disapproval at Tchaikovsky's successive compositions, had found a work by his former pupil which he could endorse", according to Tchaikovsky biographer David Brown (Brown, The Years of Wandering, 121).) He and Zaremba clashed with Tchaikovsky when he submitted his First Symphony for performance by the Russian Musical Society in Saint Petersburg. Rubinstein and Zaremba refused to consider the work unless substantial changes were made. Tchaikovsky complied but they still refused to perform the symphony. Tchaikovsky, distressed that he had been treated as though he were still their student, withdrew the symphony. It was given its first complete performance, minus the changes Rubinstein and Zaremba had requested, in Moscow in February 1868.

Once Tchaikovsky graduated in 1865, Rubinstein's brother Nikolai offered him the post of Professor of Music Theory at the soon-to-open Moscow Conservatory. While the salary for his professorship was only 50 rubles a month, the offer itself boosted Tchaikovsky's morale and he accepted the post eagerly. He was further heartened by news of the first public performance of one of his works, his Characteristic Dances, conducted by Johann Strauss II at a concert in Pavlovsk Park on 11 September 1865 (Tchaikovsky later included this work, re-titled Dances of the Hay Maidens, in his opera The Voyevoda).

From 1867 to 1878, Tchaikovsky combined his professorial duties with music criticism while continuing to compose. This activity exposed him to a range of contemporary music and afforded him the opportunity to travel abroad. In his reviews, he praised Ludwig van Beethoven, considered Johannes Brahms overrated and, despite his admiration, took Schumann to task for poor orchestration. (Note: His critique led Tchaikovsky to consider rescoring Schumann's symphonies, a project he never realized (Wiley, Tchaikovsky, 79).) He appreciated the staging of Richard Wagner's Der Ring des Nibelungen at its première at the Bayreuth Festival, but not the music, calling Das Rheingold "unlikely nonsense, through which, from time to time, sparkle unusually beautiful and astonishing details". A recurring theme he addressed was the poor state of Russian opera.

=== Relationship with The Five ===
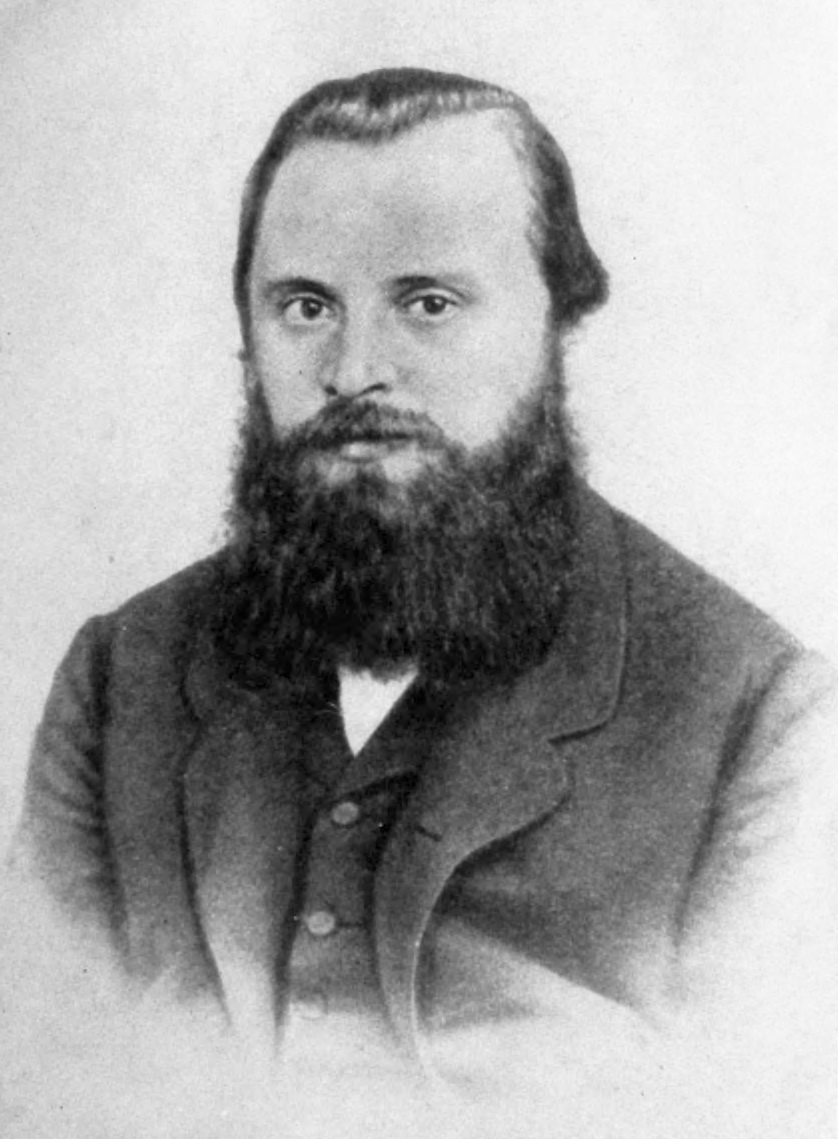
A young Mily Balakirev, one of The Five, c. 1866

In 1856, while Tchaikovsky was still at the School of Jurisprudence and Anton Rubinstein lobbied aristocrats to form the Russian Musical Society, the critic Vladimir Stasov and an 18-year-old pianist, Mily Balakirev, met and agreed upon a nationalist agenda for Russian music, one that would take the operas of Mikhail Glinka as a model and incorporate elements from folk music, reject traditional Western practices and use non-Western harmonic devices such as the whole tone and octatonic scales. They saw Western-style conservatories as unnecessary and antipathetic to fostering native talent.

Mily Balakirev, César Cui, Modest Mussorgsky, Nikolai Rimsky-Korsakov and Alexander Borodin became known as the moguchaya kuchka, translated into English as the "Mighty Handful" or "The Five". Rubinstein criticized their emphasis on amateur efforts in musical composition; Balakirev and later Mussorgsky attacked Rubinstein for his musical conservatism and his belief in professional music training. Tchaikovsky and his fellow conservatory students were caught in the middle.

While ambivalent about much of The Five's music, Tchaikovsky remained on friendly terms with most of its members. In 1869, he and Balakirev worked together on what became Tchaikovsky's first recognized masterpiece, the fantasy-overture Romeo and Juliet, a work which The Five wholeheartedly embraced. The group also welcomed his Second Symphony, later nicknamed the Little Russian. (Note: According to historian Harlow Robinson, it was Nikolay Kashkin who first "suggested the moniker [Little Russian] in his 1896 book Memories of Tchaikovsky.") Despite their support, Tchaikovsky made considerable efforts to ensure his musical independence from the group as well as from the conservative faction at the Saint Petersburg Conservatory.

=== Rise to prominence and travel years ===
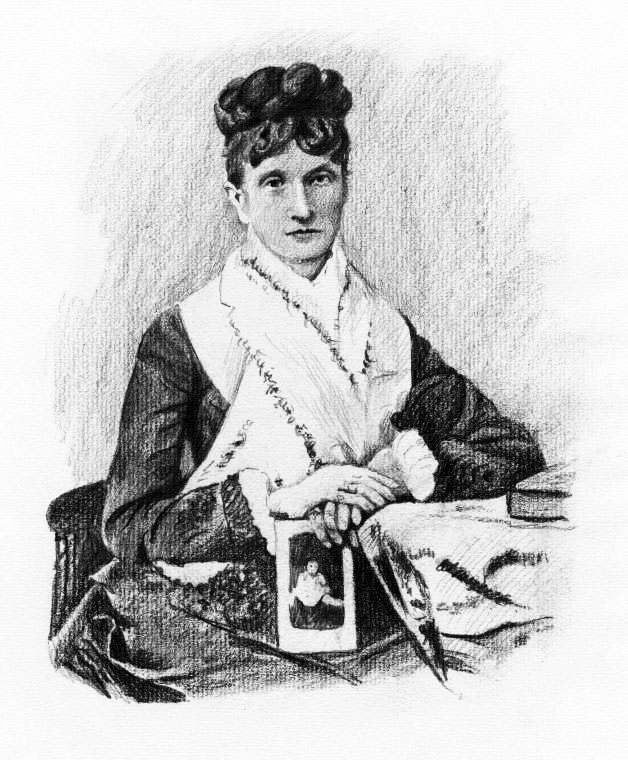
Nadezhda von Meck, Tchaikovsky's patroness and confidante from 1877 to 1890

Piano Concerto No.1 in B-flat minor Op.23 – I. Allegro
Allegro non-troppo e molto maestoso – Allegro con spirito from Tchaikovsky's First Piano Concerto

The infrequency of Tchaikovsky's musical successes, won with tremendous effort, exacerbated his lifelong sensitivity to criticism. Nikolai Rubinstein's private fits of rage critiquing his music, such as attacking the First Piano Concerto, did not help matters. His popularity grew, however, as several first-rate artists became willing to perform his compositions. Hans von Bülow premiered the First Piano Concerto and championed other Tchaikovsky works both as pianist and conductor. Other artists included Adele aus der Ohe, Max Erdmannsdörfer, Eduard Nápravník and Sergei Taneyev.

Another factor that helped Tchaikovsky's music become popular was a shift in attitude among Russian audiences. Whereas they had previously been satisfied with flashy virtuoso performances of technically demanding but musically lightweight works, they gradually began listening with increasing appreciation of the composition itself. Tchaikovsky's works were performed frequently, with few delays between their composition and first performances; the publication from 1867 onward of his songs and great piano music for the home market also helped boost the composer's popularity.

During the late 1860s, Tchaikovsky began to compose operas. His first, The Voyevoda, based on a play by Alexander Ostrovsky, premiered in 1869. The composer became dissatisfied with it, however, and, having re-used parts of it in later works, destroyed the manuscript. Undina followed in 1870. Only excerpts were performed and it, too, was destroyed. Between these projects, Tchaikovsky started to compose an opera called Mandragora, to a libretto by Sergei Rachinskii; the only music he completed was a short chorus of Flowers and Insects.

The first Tchaikovsky opera to survive intact, The Oprichnik, premiered in 1874. During its composition, he lost Ostrovsky's part-finished libretto. Tchaikovsky, too embarrassed to ask for another copy, decided to write the libretto himself, modeling his dramatic technique on that of Eugène Scribe. Cui wrote a "characteristically savage press attack" on the opera. Mussorgsky, writing to Vladimir Stasov, disapproved of the opera as pandering to the public. Nevertheless, The Oprichnik continues to be performed from time to time in Russia.

The last of the early operas, Vakula the Smith (Op. 14), was composed in the second half of 1874. The libretto, based on Nikolai Gogol's Christmas Eve, was to have been set to music by Alexander Serov. With Serov's death, the libretto was opened to a competition with a guarantee that the winning entry would be premiered by the Imperial Mariinsky Theatre. Tchaikovsky was declared the winner, but at the 1876 premiere, the opera enjoyed only a lukewarm reception. After Tchaikovsky's death, Rimsky-Korsakov wrote the opera Christmas Eve, based on the same story.

Other works of this period include the Variations on a Rococo Theme for cello and orchestra, the Third and Fourth Symphonies, the ballet Swan Lake, and the opera Eugene Onegin.

Tchaikovsky remained abroad for a year after the disintegration of his marriage. During this time, he completed Eugene Onegin, orchestrated his Fourth Symphony, and composed the Violin Concerto. He returned briefly to the Moscow Conservatory in the autumn of 1879. (Note: Rubinstein had actually been operating under the assumption that Tchaikovsky might leave from the onset of the composer's marital crisis and was prepared for it (Wiley, Tchaikovsky, 189–190). However, his meddling in the Tchaikovsky–von Meck relationship might have contributed to the composer's actual departure. Rubinstein's actions, which soured his relations with both Tchaikovsky and von Meck, included imploring von Meck in person to end Tchaikovsky's subsidy for the composer's own good (Brown, The Crisis Years, 250; Wiley, Tchaikovsky, 188–189). Rubinstein's actions, in turn, had been spurred by Tchaikovsky's withdrawal from the Russian delegation for the 1878 Paris World's Fair, a position for which Rubinstein had lobbied on the composer's behalf (Brown, The Crisis Years, 249–250; Wiley, Tchaikovsky, 180, 188–189). Rubinstein had been scheduled to conduct four concerts there; the first featured Tchaikovsky's First Piano Concerto (Wiley, Tchaikovsky, 190).) For the next few years, assured of a regular income from von Meck, he traveled incessantly throughout Europe and rural Russia, mainly alone, and avoided social contact whenever possible.

During this time, Tchaikovsky's foreign reputation grew and a positive reassessment of his music also took place in Russia, thanks in part to the novelist Fyodor Dostoevsky's call for "universal unity" with the West at the unveiling of the Pushkin Monument in Moscow in 1880. Before Dostoevsky's speech, Tchaikovsky's music had been considered "overly dependent on the West". As Dostoevsky's message spread throughout Russia, this stigma toward Tchaikovsky's music evaporated. The unprecedented acclaim for him even drew a cult following among the young intelligentsia of Saint Petersburg, including Alexandre Benois, Léon Bakst and Sergei Diaghilev.

Two musical works from this period stand out. With the Cathedral of Christ the Saviour nearing completion in Moscow in 1880, the 25th anniversary of the coronation of Alexander II in 1881, (Note: Celebration of this anniversary did not take place as Alexander II was assassinated in March 1881.) and the 1882 Moscow Arts and Industry Exhibition in the planning stage, Nikolai Rubinstein suggested that Tchaikovsky compose a grand commemorative piece. Tchaikovsky agreed and finished it within six weeks. He wrote to Nadezhda von Meck that this piece, the 1812 Overture, would be "very loud and noisy, but I wrote it with no warm feeling of love, and therefore there will probably be no artistic merits in it". He also warned the conductor Eduard Nápravník that "I shan't be at all surprised and offended if you find that it is in a style unsuitable for symphony concerts". Nevertheless, the overture became, for many, "the piece by Tchaikovsky they know best", particularly well-known for the use of cannon in the scores.

On 23 March 1881, Nikolai Rubinstein died in Paris. That December, Tchaikovsky started work on his Piano Trio in A minor, "dedicated to the memory of a great artist". First performed privately at the Moscow Conservatory on the first anniversary of Rubinstein's death, the piece became extremely popular during the composer's lifetime; in November 1893, it would become Tchaikovsky's own elegy at memorial concerts in Moscow and St. Petersburg. (Note: The piece also fulfilled a long-standing request by von Meck for such a work, to be performed by her then-house pianist, Claude Debussy (Brown, New Grove vol. 18, p. 620).)

=== Return to Russia ===
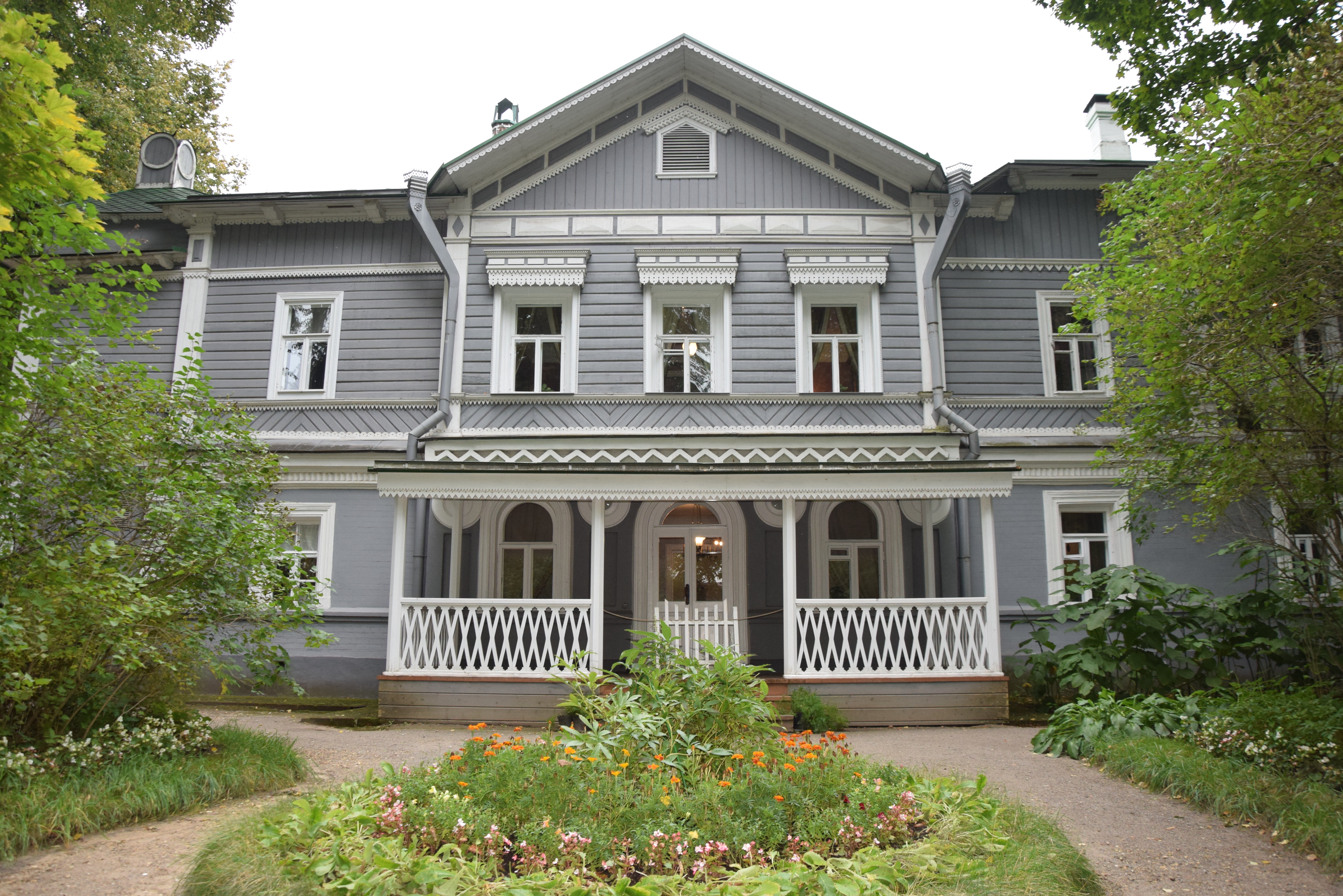
Tchaikovsky's last home in Klin, now the Tchaikovsky State House-Museum

In 1884, Tchaikovsky began to shed his unsociability and restlessness. That March, Emperor Alexander III conferred upon him the Order of Saint Vladimir (fourth class), which included a title of hereditary nobility and a personal audience with the Tsar. This was seen as a seal of official approval which advanced Tchaikovsky's social standing and might have been cemented in the composer's mind by the success of his Orchestral Suite No. 3 at its January 1885 premiere in Saint Petersburg.

In 1885, Alexander III requested a new production of Eugene Onegin at the Bolshoi Kamenny Theatre in Saint Petersburg. (Note: Its only other production had been by students from the Conservatory.) By having the opera staged there and not at the Mariinsky Theatre, he served notice that Tchaikovsky's music was replacing Italian opera as the official imperial art. In addition, at the instigation of Ivan Vsevolozhsky, Director of the Imperial Theaters and a patron of the composer, Tchaikovsky was awarded a lifetime annual pension of 3,000 rubles from the Tsar. This made him the premier court composer, in practice if not in the actual title.

Despite Tchaikovsky's disdain for public life, he now participated in it as part of his increasing celebrity and out of a duty he felt to promote Russian music. He helped support his former pupil Sergei Taneyev, who was now director of Moscow Conservatory, by attending student examinations and negotiating the sometimes sensitive relations among various members of the staff. He served as director of the Moscow branch of the Russian Musical Society during the 1889–1890 season. In this post, he invited many international celebrities to conduct, including Brahms, Antonín Dvořák and Jules Massenet.

During this period, Tchaikovsky also began promoting Russian music as a conductor. In January 1887, he substituted, on short notice, at the Bolshoi Theater in Moscow for performances of his opera Cherevichki. Within a year, he was in considerable demand throughout Europe and Russia. These appearances helped him overcome life-long stage fright and boosted his self-assurance. In 1888, Tchaikovsky led the premiere of his Fifth Symphony in Saint Petersburg, repeating the work a week later with the first performance of his tone poem Hamlet. Although critics proved hostile, with César Cui calling the symphony "routine" and "meretricious", both works were received with extreme enthusiasm by audiences and Tchaikovsky, undeterred, continued to conduct the symphony in Russia and Europe. Conducting brought him to the United States in 1891, where he led the New York Music Society's orchestra in his Festival Coronation March at the inaugural concert of Carnegie Hall.

=== Belyayev circle and growing reputation ===
In November 1887, Tchaikovsky arrived at Saint Petersburg in time to hear several of the Russian Symphony Concerts, devoted exclusively to the music of Russian composers. One included the first complete performance of his revised First Symphony; another featured the final version of Third Symphony of Nikolai Rimsky-Korsakov, with whose circle Tchaikovsky was already in touch.

Rimsky-Korsakov, with Alexander Glazunov, Anatoly Lyadov and several other nationalistically-minded composers and musicians, had formed a group known as the Belyayev circle, named after a merchant and amateur musician who became an influential music patron and publisher. Tchaikovsky spent much time in this circle, becoming far more at ease with them than he had been with the 'Five' and increasingly confident in showcasing his music alongside theirs. This relationship lasted until Tchaikovsky's death.

In 1892, Tchaikovsky was voted a member of the Académie des Beaux-Arts in France, only the second Russian subject to be so honored (the first was the sculptor Mark Antokolsky). The following year, the University of Cambridge in England awarded Tchaikovsky an honorary Doctor of Music degree.

== Personal life ==
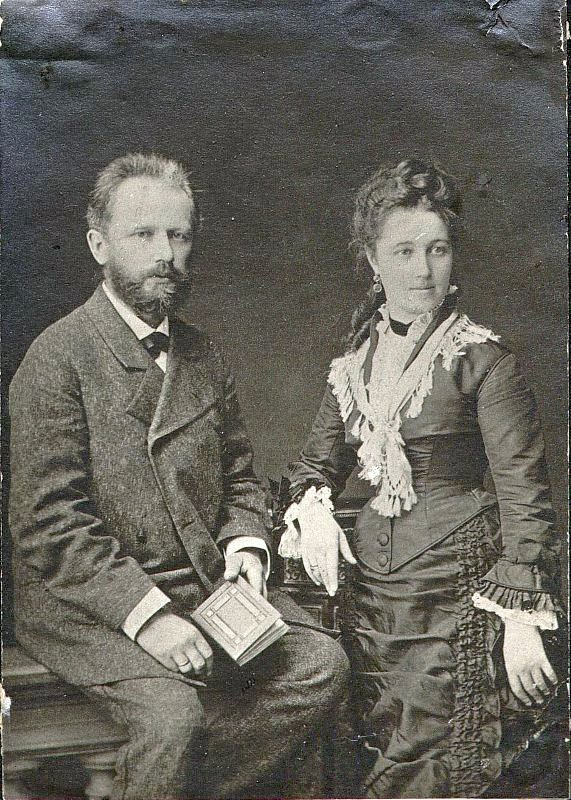
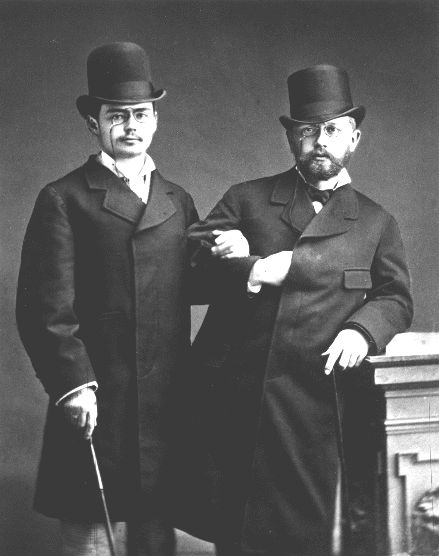
(Left to right) Tchaikovsky and Antonina on their honeymoon in 1877; Iosif Kotek (left) and Tchaikovsky (right) in 1877

Discussion of Tchaikovsky's personal life, especially his sexuality, has perhaps been among the most extensive of any composer in the 19th century and certainly of any Russian composer of his time. It has also at times caused considerable confusion, from Soviet efforts to expunge all references to homosexuality and portray him as a heterosexual, to efforts at analysis by Western biographers.

Biographers have generally agreed that Tchaikovsky was homosexual. He sought the company of other men in his circle for extended periods, "associating openly and establishing professional connections with them." His first love was reportedly Sergey Kireyev, a younger fellow student at the Imperial School of Jurisprudence. According to Modest Tchaikovsky, this was Pyotr Ilyich's "strongest, longest and purest love". His letters and his dedication of the Sixth Symphony to his 21-year-old nephew Vladimir "Bob" Davydov have been interpreted by scholars as evidence of a romantic attachment. The degree to which the composer might have felt comfortable with his sexual desires has, however, remained open to debate. It is still unknown whether Tchaikovsky, according to the musicologist and biographer David Brown, "felt tainted within himself, defiled by something from which he finally realized he could never escape" or whether, according to Alexander Poznansky, he experienced "no unbearable guilt" over his sexual desires and "eventually came to see his sexual peculiarities as an insurmountable and even natural part of his personality ... without experiencing any serious psychological damage".

Relevant portions of his brother Modest's autobiography, where he tells of the composer's same-sex attraction, have been published, as have letters previously suppressed by Soviet censors in which Tchaikovsky openly writes of it. Such censorship has persisted in the Russian government, resulting in many officials, including the former culture minister Vladimir Medinsky, denying his homosexuality outright. Passages in Tchaikovsky's letters which reveal his homosexual desires have been censored in Russia. In one such passage he said of a homosexual acquaintance: "Petashenka used to drop by with the criminal intention of observing the Cadet Corps, which is right opposite our windows, but I've been trying to discourage these compromising visits—and with some success." In another one, he wrote: "After our walk, I offered him some money, which was refused. He does it for the love of art and adores men with beards."

Tchaikovsky lived as a bachelor for most of his life. In 1868, he met Belgian soprano Désirée Artôt with whom he considered marriage, but, owing to various circumstances, the relationship ended. Tchaikovsky later claimed she was the only woman he ever loved. In 1877, at the age of 37, he wed a former student, Antonina Miliukova. The marriage was a disaster. Mismatched psychologically and sexually, the couple lived together for only two and a half months before Tchaikovsky left, overwrought emotionally and suffering from acute writer's block. Tchaikovsky's family remained supportive of him during this crisis and throughout his life. Tchaikovsky's marital debacle may have forced him to face the full truth about his sexuality. He never blamed Antonina for the failure of their marriage.

Tchaikovsky was also aided by Nadezhda von Meck, the widow of a railway magnate, who had begun contact with him not long before the marriage. As well as an important friend and emotional support, she became his patroness for the next 13 years, which allowed him to focus exclusively on composition. Although Tchaikovsky called her his "best friend", they agreed never to meet.

== Death ==
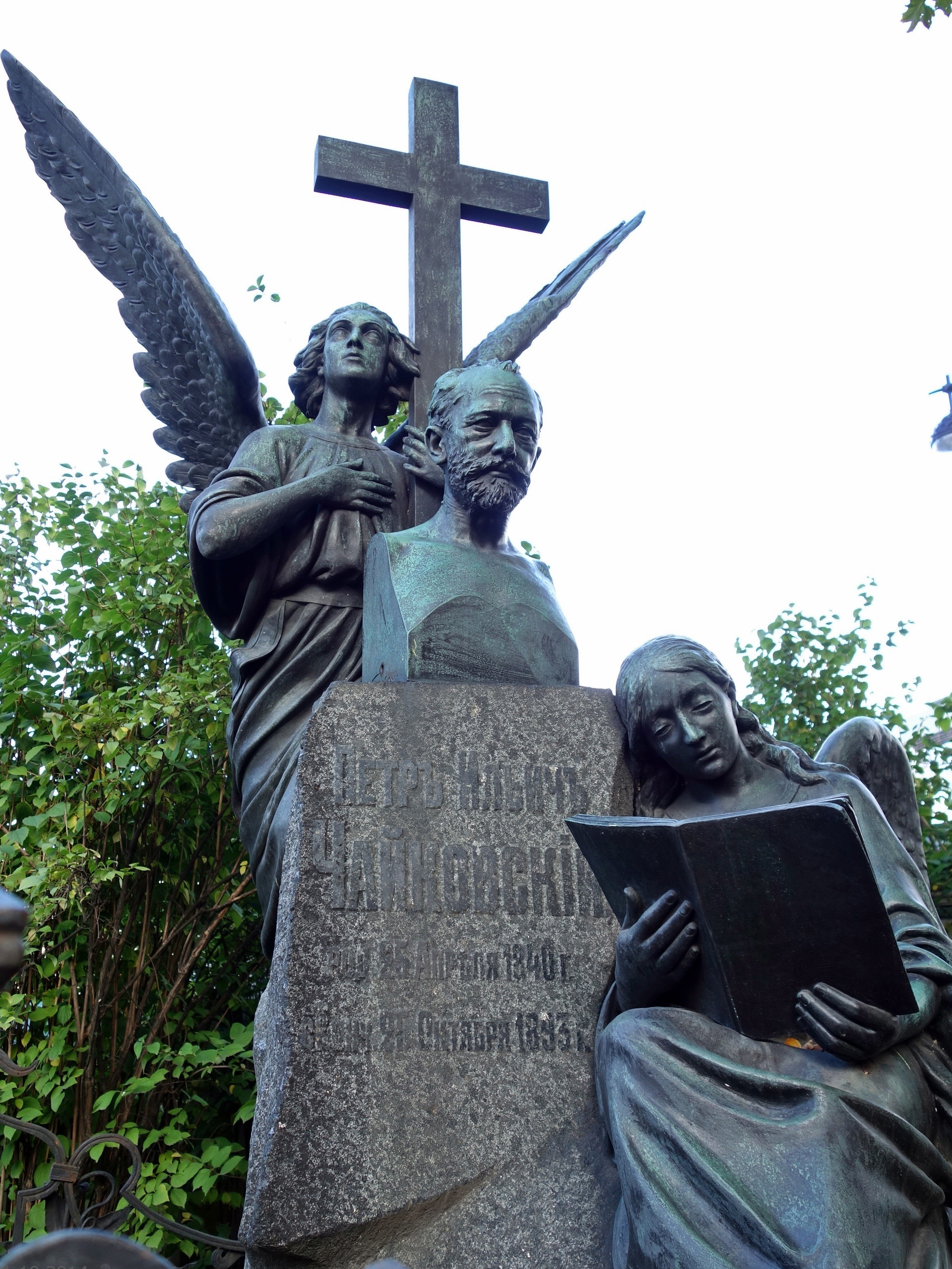
Tchaikovsky's grave in Tikhvin Cemetery in Saint Petersburg

On 6 November 1893, Tchaikovsky died in Saint Petersburg, aged 53. He was interred in Tikhvin Cemetery at the Alexander Nevsky Monastery, near the graves of his fellow composers Alexander Borodin, Mikhail Glinka, and Modest Mussorgsky; later, Nikolai Rimsky-Korsakov and Mily Balakirev were also buried nearby.

Tchaikovsky's death is attributed to cholera, caused by drinking unboiled water at a local restaurant. In the 1980s in Britain, however, there was academic speculation that he killed himself, either with poison or by contracting cholera intentionally; in the New Grove Dictionary of Music, Roland John Wiley wrote: "the polemics over Tchaikovsky's death have reached an impasse ... . As for illness, problems of evidence offer little hope of satisfactory resolution: the state of diagnosis; the confusion of witnesses; disregard of long-term effects of smoking and alcohol. We do not know how Tchaikovsky died. We may never find out."

== Music ==
=== Antecedents and influences ===
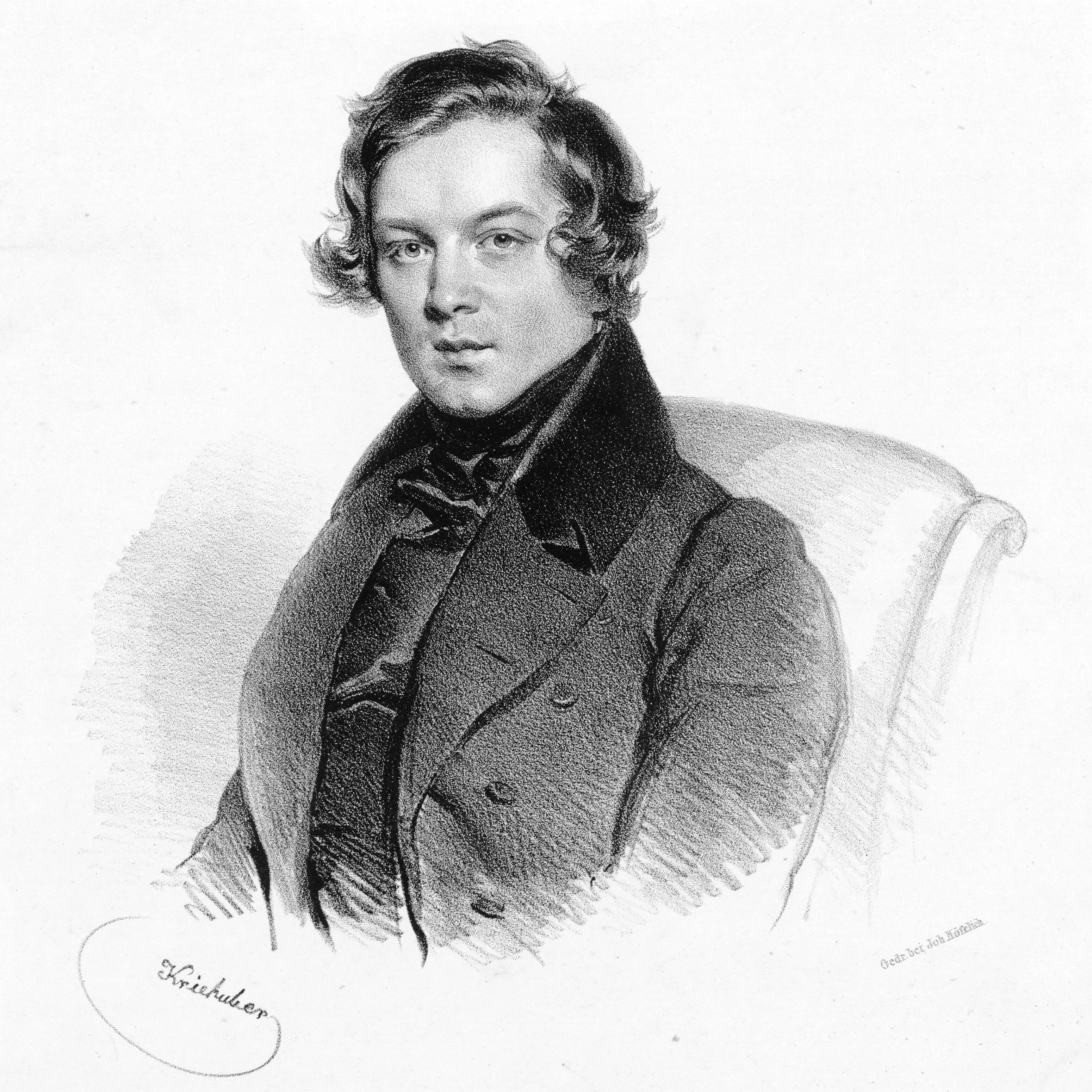
An 1839 lithograph of Robert Schumann by Josef Kriehuber

Of Tchaikovsky's Western predecessors, Robert Schumann stands out as an influence in formal structure, harmonic practices, and piano writing, according to Brown and the musicologist Roland John Wiley. Boris Asafyev comments that Schumann left his mark on Tchaikovsky not just as a formal influence but also as an example of musical dramaturgy and self-expression. Leon Botstein argues the music of Franz Liszt and Richard Wagner also left their imprints on Tchaikovsky's orchestral style. (Note: As proof of Wagner's influence, Botstein cites a letter from Tchaikovsky to Taneyev, in which the composer "readily admits the influence of the Nibelungen on Francesca da Rimini". This letter is quoted in Brown, The Crisis Years, 108.) The late-Romantic trend for writing orchestral suites, begun by Franz Lachner, Jules Massenet, and Joachim Raff after the rediscovery of Johann Sebastian Bach's works in that genre, may have influenced Tchaikovsky to try his own hand at them.

Tchaikovsky's teacher Anton Rubinstein's opera The Demon became a model for the final tableau of Eugene Onegin. So did Léo Delibes' ballets Coppélia and Sylvia for The Sleeping Beauty (Note: While it is sometimes thought these two ballets also influenced Tchaikovsky's work on Swan Lake, he had already composed that work before learning of them (Brown, The Crisis Years, 77).) and Georges Bizet's opera Carmen (a work Tchaikovsky admired tremendously) for The Queen of Spades. Otherwise, it was to composers of the past that Tchaikovsky turned—Beethoven, whose music he respected; Wolfgang Amadeus Mozart, whom he considered his favourite composer; Glinka, whose opera A Life for the Tsar made an indelible impression on him as a child and whose scoring he studied assiduously; and Adolphe Adam, whose ballet Giselle was a favorite of his from his student days and whose score he consulted while working on The Sleeping Beauty. Beethoven’s symphonies and string quartets may have influenced Tchaikovsky's attempts in the mediums. Other composers whose work interested Tchaikovsky included Hector Berlioz, Felix Mendelssohn, Giacomo Meyerbeer, Gioachino Rossini, Giuseppe Verdi, Vincenzo Bellini, Carl Maria von Weber and Henry Litolff.

=== Creative range ===
Tchaikovsky displayed a wide stylistic and emotional range, from light salon works to grand symphonies. Some of his works, such as the Variations on a Rococo Theme, employ a Classical form reminiscent of 18th-century composers such as Mozart. Other compositions, such as his Little Russian symphony and his opera Vakula the Smith, flirt with musical practices more akin to those of The Five, especially in their use of folk song. Other works, such as Tchaikovsky's last three symphonies, employ a personal musical idiom that facilitated intense emotional expression.

=== Compositional style ===
Valse in F-sharp minor
From Twelve Pieces for piano, Op. 40, No. 9, a digital recording by Kevin MacLeod

Romeo and Juliet Overture
Performed by the Skidmore College Orchestra

1812 Overture
Performed by the Skidmore College Orchestra

==== Melody ====
The American music critic and journalist Harold C. Schonberg wrote of Tchaikovsky's "sweet, inexhaustible, supersensuous fund of melody", a feature that has ensured his music's continued success with audiences. Tchaikovsky's complete range of melodic styles was as wide as that of his compositions. Sometimes he used Western-style melodies, sometimes original melodies written in the style of Russian folk song; sometimes he used actual folk songs. According to The New Grove, Tchaikovsky's melodic gift could also become his worst enemy in two ways.

The first challenge arose from his ethnic heritage. Unlike Western themes, the melodies that Russian composers wrote tended to be self-contained: they functioned with a mindset of stasis and repetition rather than one of progress and ongoing development. On a technical level, it made modulating to a new key to introduce a contrasting second theme exceedingly difficult, as this was literally a foreign concept that did not exist in Russian music.

The second way melody worked against Tchaikovsky was a challenge that he shared with the majority of Romantic-age composers. They did not write in the regular, symmetrical melodic shapes that worked well with sonata form, such as those favored by Classical composers such as Joseph Haydn, Mozart or Beethoven; rather, the themes favored by Romantics were complete and independent in themselves. This completeness hindered their use as structural elements in combination with one another. This challenge was why the Romantics "were never natural symphonists". All a composer like Tchaikovsky could do with them was to essentially repeat them, even when he modified them to generate tension, maintain interest, and satisfy listeners.

==== Harmony ====
Harmony could be a potential trap for Tchaikovsky, according to Brown, since Russian creativity tended to focus on inertia and self-enclosed tableaux, while Western harmony worked against this to propel the music onward and, on a larger scale, shape it. Modulation, the shifting from one key to another, was a driving principle in both harmony and sonata form, the primary Western large-scale musical structure since the middle of the 18th century. Modulation maintained harmonic interest over an extended time scale, provided a clear contrast between musical themes, and showed how those themes were related to each other.

One point in Tchaikovsky's favor was "a flair for harmony" that "astonished" Rudolph Kündinger, Tchaikovsky's music tutor during his time at the School of Jurisprudence. Added to what he learned at the Saint Petersburg Conservatory studies, this talent allowed Tchaikovsky to employ a varied range of harmony in his music, from the Western harmonic and textural practices of his first two string quartets to the use of the whole-tone scale in the center of the finale of the Second Symphony, a practice more typically used by The Five.

==== Rhythm ====
Rhythmically, Tchaikovsky sometimes experimented with unusual meters. More often, he used a firm, regular meter, a practice that served him well in dance music. At times, his rhythms became pronounced enough to become the main expressive agent of the music. They also became a means, found typically in Russian folk music, of simulating movement or progression in large-scale symphonic movements—a "synthetic propulsion", as Brown phrases it, which substituted for the momentum that would be created in strict sonata form by the interaction of melodic or motivic elements. This interaction generally does not take place in Russian music.

==== Structure ====
Tchaikovsky struggled with sonata form. Its principle of organic growth through the interplay of musical themes was alien to Russian practice. The traditional argument that Tchaikovsky seemed unable to develop themes in this manner fails to consider this point; it also discounts the possibility that Tchaikovsky might have intended the development passages in his large-scale works to act as "enforced hiatuses" to build tension, rather than grow organically as smoothly progressive musical arguments.

According to Brown and the musicologists Hans Keller and Daniel Zhitomirsky, Tchaikovsky found his solution to large-scale structure while composing the Fourth Symphony. He essentially sidestepped thematic interaction and kept sonata form only as an "outline", as Zhitomirsky phrases it. Within this outline, the focus centered on periodic alternation and juxtaposition. Tchaikovsky placed blocks of dissimilar tonal and thematic material alongside one another, with what Keller calls "new and violent contrasts" between musical themes, keys, and harmonies. This process, according to Brown and Keller, builds momentum and adds intense drama. While the result, John Warrack charges, is still "an ingenious episodic treatment of two tunes rather than a symphonic development of them" in the Germanic sense, Brown counters that it took the listener of the period "through a succession of often highly charged sections which added up to a radically new kind of symphonic experience" (italics Brown), one that functioned not on the basis of summation, as Austro-German symphonies did, but on one of accumulation.

Partly owing to the melodic and structural intricacies involved in this accumulation and partly due to the composer's nature, Tchaikovsky's music became intensely expressive. This intensity was entirely new to Russian music and prompted some Russians to place Tchaikovsky's name alongside that of Dostoevsky. The German musicologist Hermann Kretzschmar credits Tchaikovsky in his later symphonies with offering "full images of life, developed freely, sometimes even dramatically, around psychological contrasts ... This music has the mark of the truly lived and felt experience". Leon Botstein, in elaborating on this comment, suggests that listening to Tchaikovsky's music "became a psychological mirror connected to everyday experience, one that reflected on the dynamic nature of the listener's own emotional self". This active engagement with the music "opened for the listener a vista of emotional and psychological tension and an extremity of feeling that possessed relevance because it seemed reminiscent of one's own 'truly lived and felt experience' or one's search for intensity in a deeply personal sense".

==== Repetition ====
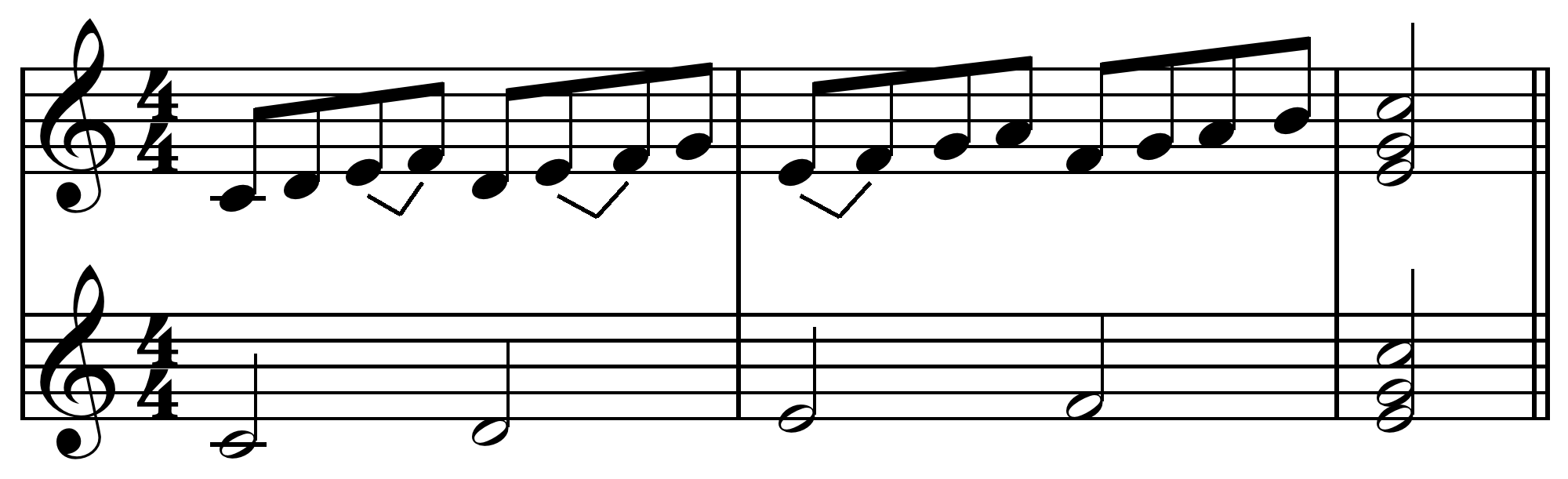
Sequence ascending by step with four continuously higher segments that continue by the same distance (seconds: C–D, D–E, etc.)

As mentioned above, repetition was a natural part of Tchaikovsky's music, just as it is an integral part of Russian music. His use of sequences within melodies (repeating a tune at a higher or lower pitch in the same voice) could go on for extreme length. The problem with repetition is that, over a period of time, the melody being repeated remains static, even when there is a surface level of rhythmic activity added to it. Tchaikovsky kept the musical conversation flowing by treating melody, tonality, rhythm and sound color as one integrated unit, rather than as separate elements.

By making subtle but noticeable changes in the rhythm or phrasing of a tune, modulating to another key, changing the melody itself or varying the instruments playing it, Tchaikovsky could keep a listener's interest from flagging. By extending the number of repetitions, he could increase the musical and dramatic tension of a passage, building "into an emotional experience of almost unbearable intensity", as Brown phrases it, controlling when the peak and release of that tension would take place. The musicologist Martin Cooper calls this practice a subtle form of unifying a piece of music and adds that Tchaikovsky brought it to a high point of refinement.

==== Orchestration ====
Dance of the Sugar Plum Fairy
"Dance of the Sugar Plum Fairy" from The Nutcracker makes extensive use of the then newly invented and very rare celesta.

Like other late Romantic composers, Tchaikovsky relied heavily on orchestration for musical effects. Tchaikovsky, however, became noted for the "sensual opulence" and "voluptuous timbrel virtuosity" of his orchestration. Like Glinka, Tchaikovsky tended toward bright primary colors and sharply delineated contrasts of texture. However, beginning with the Third Symphony, Tchaikovsky experimented with an increased range of timbres. Tchaikovsky's scoring was noted and admired by some of his peers. Rimsky-Korsakov regularly referred his students at the Saint Petersburg Conservatory to it and called it "devoid of all striving after effect, [to] give a healthy, beautiful sonority". This sonority, the musicologist Richard Taruskin pointed out, is essentially Germanic in effect. Tchaikovsky's expert use of having two or more instruments play a melody simultaneously (a practice called doubling) and his ear for uncanny combinations of instruments resulted in "a generalized orchestral sonority in which the individual timbres of the instruments, being thoroughly mixed, would vanish".

==== Pastiche (Passé-ism) ====
In works like the "Serenade for Strings" and the Variations on a Rococo Theme, Tchaikovsky showed he was highly gifted at writing in a style of 18th-century European pastiche. Tchaikovsky graduated from imitation to full-scale evocation in the ballet The Sleeping Beauty and the opera The Queen of Spades. This practice, which Alexandre Benois calls "passé-ism", lends an air of timelessness and immediacy, making the past seem as though it were the present. On a practical level, Tchaikovsky was drawn to past styles because he felt he might find the solution to certain structural problems within them. His Rococo pastiches also may have offered escape into a musical world purer than his own, into which he felt himself irresistibly drawn. (In this sense, Tchaikovsky operated in the opposite manner to Igor Stravinsky, who turned to Neoclassicism partly as a form of compositional self-discovery.) Tchaikovsky's attraction to ballet might have allowed a similar refuge into a fairy-tale world, where he could freely write dance music within a tradition of French elegance.

=== Aesthetic impact ===
Maes maintains that, regardless of what he was writing, Tchaikovsky's main concern was how his music affected his listeners on an aesthetic level, at specific moments in the piece, and on a cumulative level once the music had finished. What his listeners experienced on an emotional or visceral level became an end in itself. Tchaikovsky's focus on pleasing his audience might be considered closer to that of Mendelssohn or Mozart.

And yet, even when writing so-called 'programme' music, for example, his Romeo and Juliet fantasy overture, he cast it in sonata form. His use of stylized 18th-century melodies and patriotic themes was geared toward the values of Russian aristocracy. He was aided in this by Ivan Vsevolozhsky, who commissioned The Sleeping Beauty from Tchaikovsky and the libretto for The Queen of Spades from Modest with their use of 18th-century settings stipulated firmly. (Note: Vsevolozhsky originally intended the libretto for a now-unknown composer named Nikolai Klenovsky, not Tchaikovsky (Maes, 152).) Tchaikovsky also used the polonaise frequently, the dance being a musical code for the Romanov dynasty and a symbol of Russian patriotism. Using it in the finale of a work could assure its success with Russian listeners.

== Reception ==
=== Dedicatees and collaborators ===
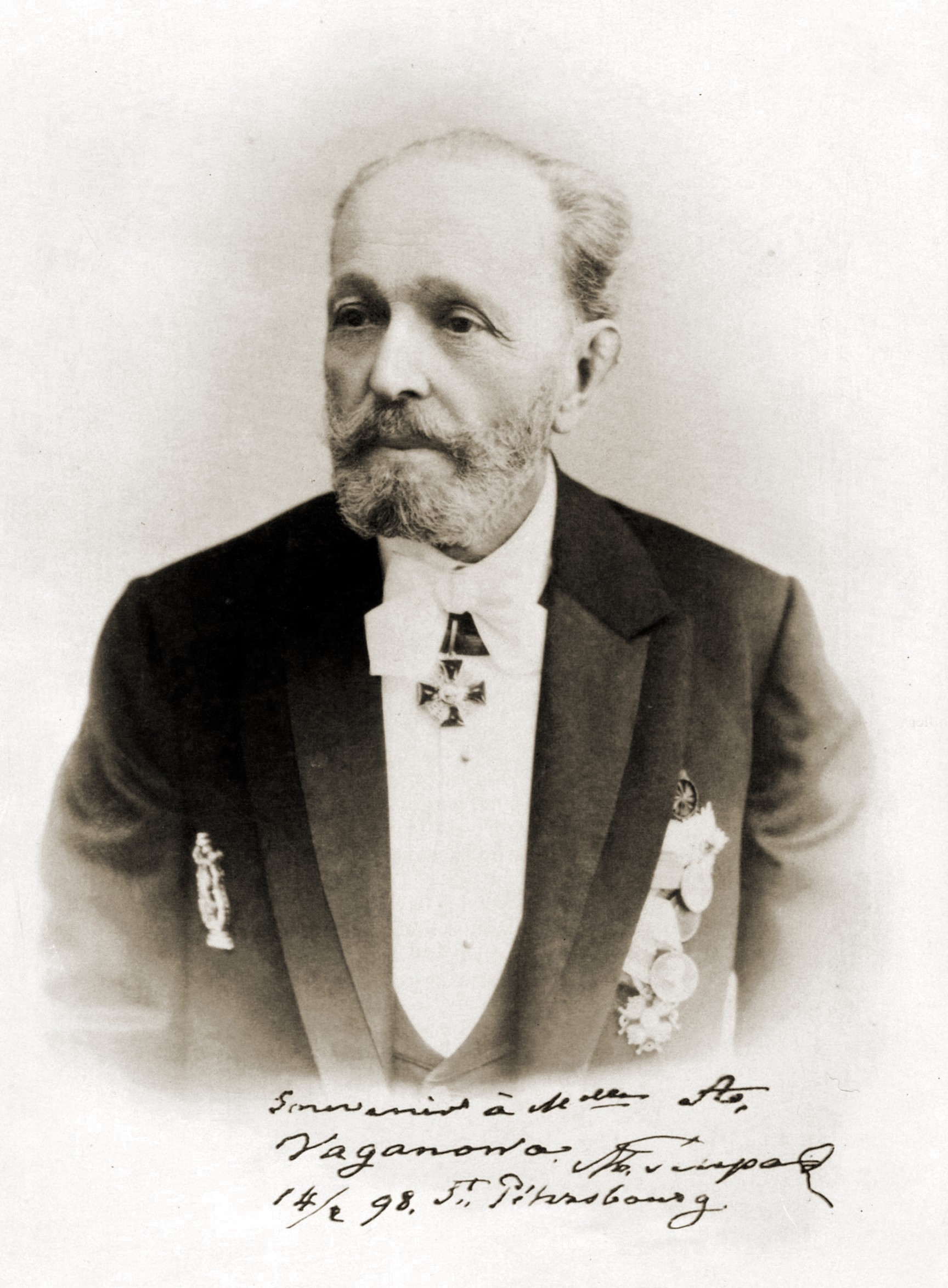
Marius Petipa c. 1890–1895

Tchaikovsky's relationship with collaborators was mixed. Like Nikolai Rubinstein with the First Piano Concerto, the virtuoso and pedagogue Leopold Auer rejected the Violin Concerto initially but changed his mind; he played it to great public success and taught it to his students, who included Jascha Heifetz and Nathan Milstein. Wilhelm Fitzenhagen "intervened considerably in shaping what he considered 'his' piece", the Variations on a Rococo Theme, according to the music critic Michael Steinberg. Tchaikovsky was angered by Fitzenhagen's license but did nothing; the Rococo Variations were published with the cellist's amendments. (Note: The composer's original has since been published but most cellists still perform Fitzenhagen's version (Campbell, 77).)

His collaboration on the three ballets went better and in Marius Petipa, who worked with him on the last two, he might have found an advocate. (Note: Tchaikovsky's work with Julius Reisinger on Swan Lake was evidently also successful, since it left him with no qualms about working with Petipa, but very little is written about it (Maes, 146).) When The Sleeping Beauty was seen by its dancers as needlessly complicated, Petipa convinced them to put in the extra effort. Tchaikovsky compromised to make his music as practical as possible for the dancers and was accorded more creative freedom than ballet composers were usually accorded at the time. He responded with scores that minimized the rhythmic subtleties normally present in his work but were inventive and rich in melody, with more refined and imaginative orchestration than in the average ballet score.

=== Critics ===
Critical reception to Tchaikovsky's music was varied but also improved over time. Even after 1880, some inside Russia held it suspect for not being nationalistic enough and thought Western European critics lauded it for exactly that reason. There might have been a grain of truth in the latter, according to the musicologist and conductor Leon Botstein, as German critics especially wrote of the "indeterminacy of [Tchaikovsky's] artistic character ... being truly at home in the non-Russian".

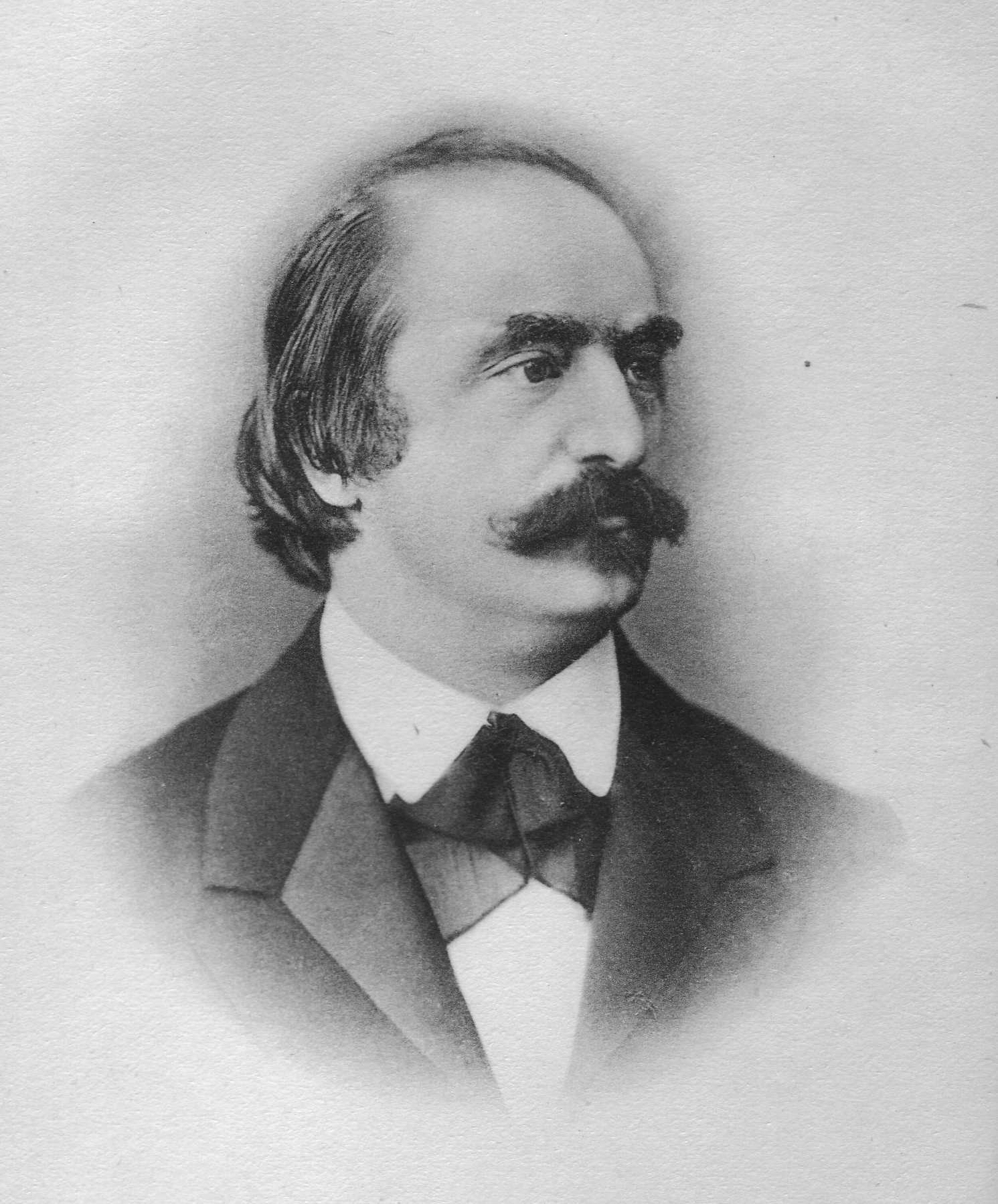
Eduard Hanslick

Of the foreign critics who did not care for his music, Eduard Hanslick lambasted the Violin Concerto as a musical composition "whose stink one can hear" and William Foster Apthorp wrote of the Fifth Symphony, "The furious peroration sounds like nothing so much as a horde of demons struggling in a torrent of brandy, the music growing drunker and drunker. Pandemonium, delirium tremens, raving, and above all, noise worse confounded!"

The division between Russian and Western critics remained through much of the 20th century but for a different reason. According to Brown and Wiley, the prevailing view of Western critics was that the same qualities in Tchaikovsky's music that appealed to audiences—its strong emotions, directness and eloquence and colorful orchestration—added up to compositional shallowness. The music's use in popular and film music, Brown says, lowered its esteem in their eyes still further. There was also the fact, pointed out earlier, that Tchaikovsky's music demanded active engagement from the listener and, as Botstein phrases it, "spoke to the listener's imaginative interior life, regardless of nationality". Conservative critics, he adds, may have felt threatened by the "violence and 'hysteria'" they detected and felt such emotive displays "attacked the boundaries of conventional aesthetic appreciation—the cultured reception of art as an act of formalist discernment—and the polite engagement of art as an act of amusement".

There has also been the fact that the composer did not follow sonata form strictly, relying instead on juxtaposing blocks of tonalities and thematic groups. Maes states this point has been seen at times as a weakness rather than a sign of originality. Even with what Schonberg termed "a professional reevaluation" of Tchaikovsky's work, the practice of faulting Tchaikovsky for not following in the steps of the Viennese masters has not gone away entirely, while his intention of writing music that would please his audiences is also sometimes taken to task. In an article in 1992, critic Allan Kozinn from the New York Times writes, "It is Tchaikovsky's flexibility, after all, that has given us a sense of his variability.... Tchaikovsky was capable of turning out music—entertaining and widely beloved though it is—that seems superficial, manipulative and trivial when regarded in the context of the whole literature. The First Piano Concerto is a case in point. It makes a joyful noise, it swims in pretty tunes and its dramatic rhetoric allows (or even requires) a soloist to make a grand, swashbuckling impression. But it is entirely hollow".

In the 21st century, however, critics are reacting more positively to Tchaikovsky's tunefulness, originality, and craftsmanship. "Tchaikovsky is being viewed again as a composer of the first rank, writing music of depth, innovation and influence," according to the cultural historian and author Joseph Horowitz. Important in this reevaluation is a shift in attitude away from the disdain for overt emotionalism that marked half of the 20th century. "We have acquired a different view of Romantic 'excess,'" Horowitz says. "Tchaikovsky is today more admired than deplored for his emotional frankness; if his music seems harried and insecure, so are we all".

=== Public ===
Horowitz maintains that, while the standing of Tchaikovsky's music has fluctuated among critics, for the public, "it never went out of style, and his most popular works have yielded iconic Sound bites, such as the love theme from Romeo and Juliet". Along with those tunes, Botstein adds, "Tchaikovsky appealed to audiences outside of Russia with an immediacy and directness that were startling even for music, an art form often associated with emotion". Tchaikovsky's melodies, stated with eloquence and matched by his inventive use of harmony and orchestration, have always ensured audience appeal. His popularity is considered secure, with his following in many countries, including the United States and the United Kingdom, second only to that of Beethoven. His music has also been used frequently in popular music and film.

== Legacy ==
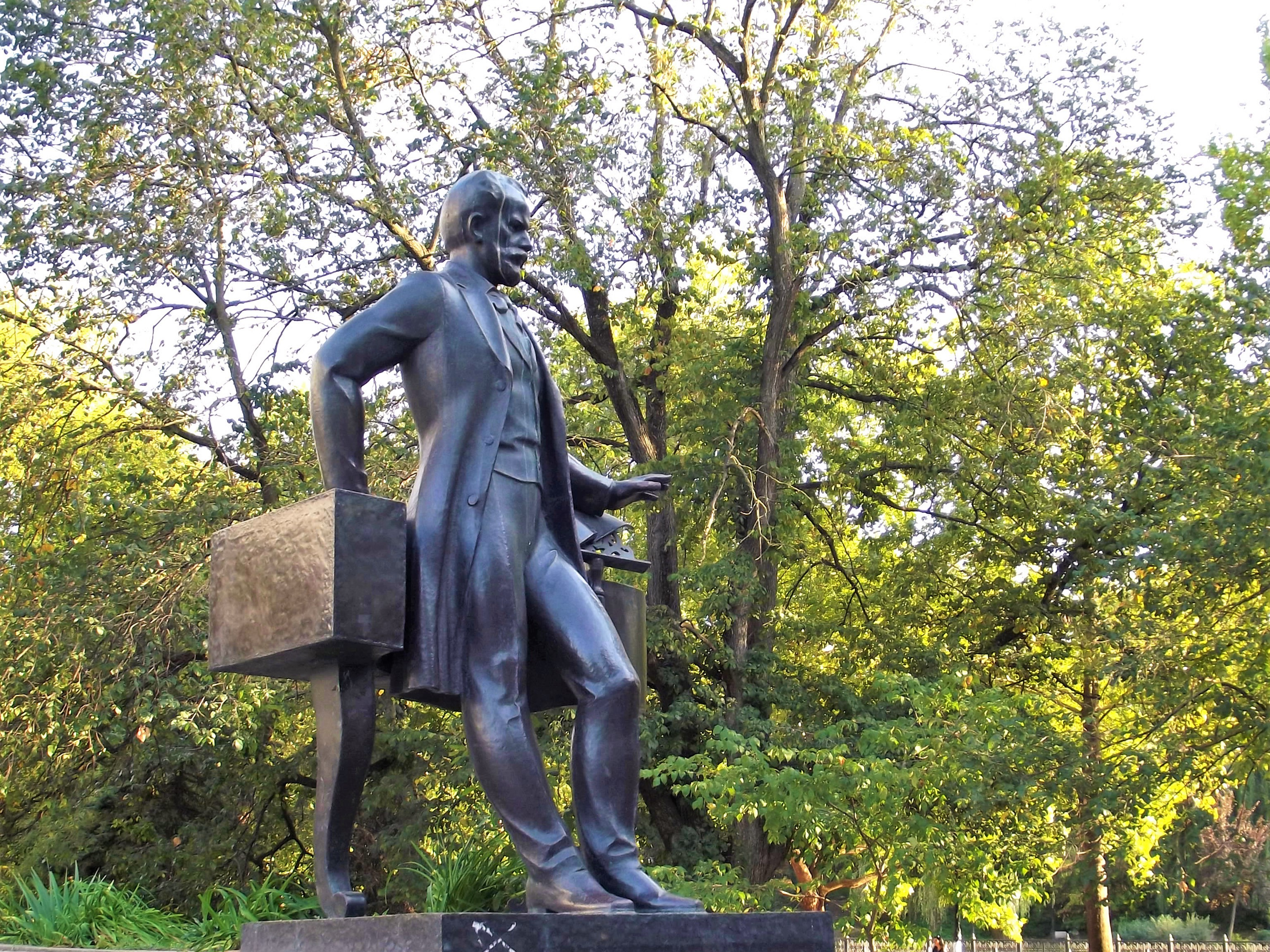
Statue of Tchaikovsky in Simferopol, Crimea

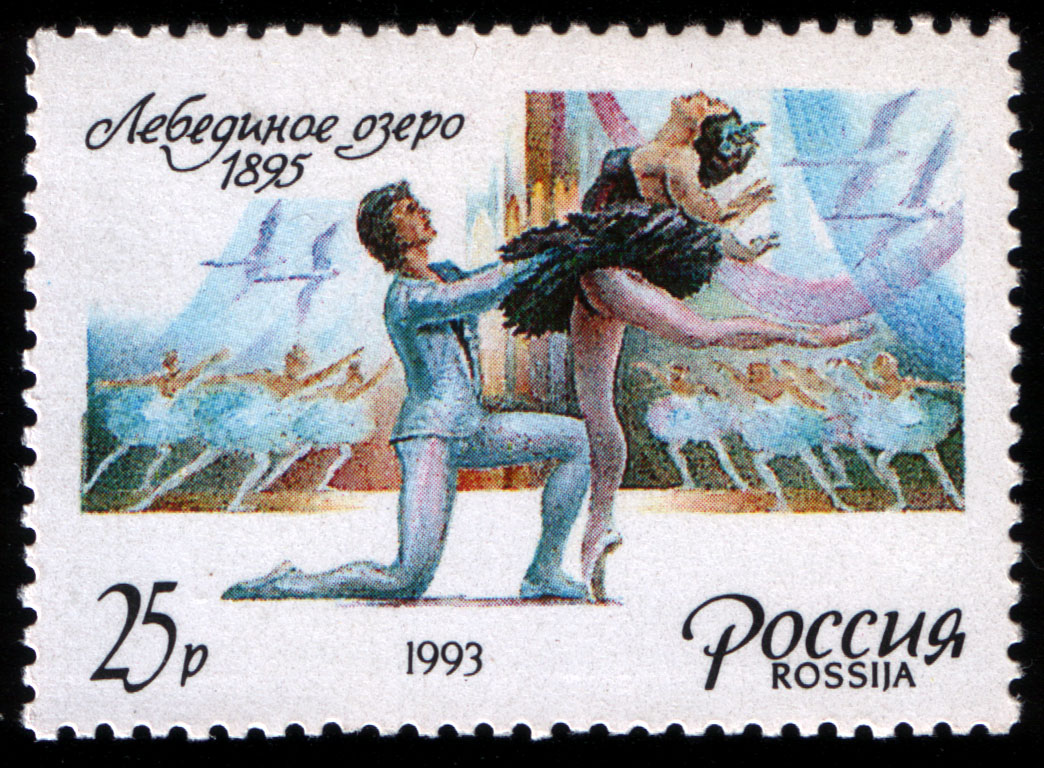
1993 Russian stamp of Swan Lake

According to Wiley, Tchaikovsky was a pioneer in several ways. "Thanks in large part to Nadezhda von Meck", Wiley writes, "he became the first full-time professional Russian composer". This, Wiley adds, allowed him the time and freedom to consolidate the Western compositional practices he had learned at the Saint Petersburg Conservatory with Russian folk song and other native musical elements to fulfill his own expressive goals and forge an original, deeply personal style. He made an impact in not only complete works such as the symphony but also program music and, as Wiley phrases it, "transformed Liszt's and Berlioz's achievements ... into matters of Shakespearean elevation and psychological import". Wiley and Holden both note that Tchaikovsky did all this without a native school of composition upon which to fall back. They point out that only Glinka had preceded him in combining Russian and Western practices and his teachers in Saint Petersburg had been thoroughly Germanic in their musical outlook. He was, they write, for all intents and purposes alone in his artistic quest.

Maes and Taruskin write that Tchaikovsky believed that his professionalism in combining skill and high standards in his musical works separated him from his contemporaries in The Five. Maes adds that, like them, he wanted to produce music that reflected Russian national character but which did so to the highest European standards of quality. Tchaikovsky, according to Maes, came along at a time when the nation itself was deeply divided as to what that character truly was. Like his country, Maes writes, it took him time to discover how to express his Russianness in a way that was true to himself and what he had learned. Because of his professionalism, Maes says, he worked hard at this goal and succeeded. The composer's friend the music critic Herman Laroche wrote of The Sleeping Beauty that the score contained "an element deeper and more general than color, in the internal structure of the music, above all in the foundation of the element of melody. This basic element is undoubtedly Russian".

Tchaikovsky was inspired to reach beyond Russia with his music, according to Maes and Taruskin. His exposure to Western music, they write, encouraged him to think it belonged to not just Russia but also the world at large. Solomon Volkov adds that this mindset made him think seriously about Russia's place in European musical culture—the first Russian composer to do so. It steeled him to become the first Russian composer to acquaint foreign audiences personally with his own works, Warrack writes, as well as those of other Russian composers. In his biography of Tchaikovsky, Anthony Holden recalls the dearth of Russian classical music before Tchaikovsky's birth, then places the composer's achievements into historical perspective: "Twenty years after Tchaikovsky's death, in 1913, Igor Stravinsky's The Rite of Spring erupted onto the musical scene, signaling Russia's arrival into 20th-century music. Between these two very different worlds, Tchaikovsky's music became the sole bridge".

== Voice recording ==
A recording was made in Moscow in January 1890, by Julius Block on behalf of Thomas Edison. A transcript of the recording follows (identification of the speakers is speculative):

Tchaikovsky's voice

Anton Rubinstein:	What a wonderful thing.	Какая прекрасная вещь... хорошо... (in Russian)	Kakaya prekrasnaya veshch'... khorosho...
Julius Block:	At last.	Наконец-то.	Nakonets-to.
Yelizaveta Lavrovskaya:	Nasty [unclear]! How dare he call me crafty?	Противный [неразборчиво]! Как он смеет называть меня коварной?	Protivnyy [nerazborchivo]! Kak on smeyet nazyvat' menya kovarnoy?
Vasily Safonov:	(sings)
Pyotr Tchaikovsky:	This trill could be better.	Эта трель могла бы быть и лучше.	Eta trel' mogla by byt' i luchshe.
Lavrovskaya:	(sings)
Tchaikovsky:	Block is a good fellow, but Edison is even better.	Блок молодец, но у Эдисона ещё лучше!	Blok molodets, no u Edisona yeshchyo luchshe!
Lavrovskaya:	(sings) A-o, a-o.	А-о, а-о.	A-o, a-o.
Safonov:	Peter Jurgenson in Moscow.	Peter Jurgenson in Moskau. (in German)	Peter Jurgenson in Moskau.
Tchaikovsky:	Who's speaking now? It seems like Safonov's voice.	Кто сейчас говорит? Кажется, голос Сафонова.	Kto seychas govorit? Kazhetsya, golos Safonova.
Safonov:	(whistles)

According to the musicologist Leonid Sabaneyev, Tchaikovsky was uncomfortable with being recorded for posterity and tried to shy away from it. On an apparently separate visit from the one related above, Block asked him to play something on the piano or at least say something. He refused, telling Block: "I am a bad pianist and my voice is raspy. Why should one eternalize it?"

== See also ==
- Tatiana Davydova
- Aleksey Sofronov
