= Harold Rosenthal =

English music critic, writer, lecturer and broadcaster (1917 - 1987)

- Born: Harold David Rosenthal; 30 September 1917; West Norwood, London, England
- Died: 19 March 1987 (aged 69); London, England
- Education: University College London
- Occupations: Music critic, writer
- Spouse: Lillah Phyllis Weiner
- Children: 2

Harold David Rosenthal OBE (30 September 1917 – 19 March 1987) was an English music critic, writer, lecturer, and broadcaster about opera. Originally a schoolmaster, he became drawn to music, particularly opera, and began working on musical publications. On the foundation of Opera magazine in London in 1950, Rosenthal was assistant editor, and became editor in 1953, retaining the post until 1986.

He was a continual campaigner on behalf of opera, and was a strong opponent of its élitist image and inflated seat prices. In the early 1950s he was appointed archivist to the Royal Opera House, Covent Garden, which led to his most substantial publication, Two Centuries of Opera at Covent Garden.

== Life and career ==
Rosenthal was born in West Norwood, London, the son of Israel Victor Rosenthal, a schoolmaster, and his wife, Leah née Samuel. He was educated at the City of London School and University College, London, where he took his BA in 1940, continuing with post-graduate studies at the London Institute of Education. In World War II he served as a private in the British army. In 1944 he married Lillah Phyllis Weiner with whom he had a son and a daughter.

After the war, Rosenthal became a schoolmaster, teaching history and English from 1946 to 1950. He became increasingly interested in music, appearing frequently as a critic and lecturer, particularly on opera. From 1947 to 1952 he was a correspondent for the American journal Opera News. A fellow enthusiast for opera, Lord Harewood, worked with him on the journal Ballet and Opera in 1948 and 1949. In 1950 Harewood founded the magazine Opera and invited Rosenthal to join him as assistant editor. Rosenthal resigned from his teaching post and devoted himself to music for the rest of his life. When Harewood left to take up work in opera administration, Rosenthal succeeded him as editor, holding the post from 1953 until 1986. In the early years of his editorship he was also archivist to the Royal Opera House (1950–1956) which led to his most substantial book, Two Centuries of Opera at Covent Garden (1958). From 1955 to 1960 he was a correspondent for the journal Musical America.

Grove's Dictionary of Music said of Rosenthal, "under his guidance [Opera magazine] came to provide an extensive coverage of operatic events throughout the world and exercised considerable influence on operatic life in Britain. … Rosenthal's work is highly regarded for its judiciousness, based on a thorough knowledge of the human voice and the operatic repertory." He was particularly noted for his opposition to the élitist image that resulted in exorbitant prices for opera tickets and for his key role in broadening opera's appeal after World War II. As a reviewer he was known for his generosity, giving the benefit of the doubt to performers, particularly when writing about young singers.

In addition to his writing, Rosenthal was recruited in an administrative capacity in a variety of musical roles. He was a member of the British Arts Council Patrons of Music Fund (1960–1970) and chairman of the music section of the Critics' Circle of Great Britain (1965–1967). From 1962 he served on the council of the Friends of Covent Garden. He also played an administrative role in international festivals, notably Edinburgh. He was made a cavaliere ufficiale of the Order of Merit of the republic of Italy in 1977, and was awarded the British OBE in 1983.

Rosenthal also received an Honorary Doctorate from Heriot-Watt University in 1985

Rosenthal died in London in 1987, aged 69.

== Publications ==
Rosenthal's principal books include:

- Sopranos of Today (1956)
- Two Centuries of Opera at Covent Garden (1958)
- The Concise Oxford Dictionary of Opera (with John Warrack) (1964)
- Great Singers of Today (1965)
- The Mapleson Memoirs (1966)
- My Mad World of Opera (1982). Autobiography
