= Pamela Dellal =

American mezzo-soprano

- Born: 1960 (age 65–66); West Caldwell, New Jersey
- Education: Boston University
- Occupations: Classical mezzo-soprano; Translator; Academic teacher
- Organizations: Emmanuel Music; Sequentia; Boston Conservatory; Brandeis University; Longy School of Music of Bard College

Pamela Dellal (born 1960) is an American mezzo-soprano in opera and concert, a musicologist and academic teacher. She has performed classical music from the medieval Hildegard von Bingen to contemporary. She is on the faculty of the Boston Conservatory, Brandeis University, and the Longy School of Music of Bard College. She has made English translations of all German texts that Johann Sebastian Bach set to music.

== Early life and education ==
Pamela Dellal was born in West Caldwell, New Jersey, and enrolled in Boston University in 1977 to study flute and voice. Her first mentor was Thomas Dunn, music director of the Handel and Haydn Society, who accepted her into the university's chamber chorus. She was asked to join the Handel and Haydn Society in 1979. In the 1980s she also clerked in the classical record department of the Harvard Coop.

== Career ==
Dellal has collaborated with many ensembles and appeared in many festivals throughout her career, including the Boston Early Music Festival, Aston Magna, and the Musicians of the Old Post Road. In opera, she appeared as Dido in Purcell's Dido and Aeneas, as Bradamante in Handel's Alcina, in Mozart's La Clemenza di Tito as Sesto, in his Così fan tutte as Dorabella, as Lucretia in Britten's The Rape of Lucretia, as Erika in Barber's Vanessa, and as Paulina in John Harbison's Winter's Tale after Shakespeare's play.

In concert, she appeared at the Kennedy Center first in Bach's Mass in B minor, conducted by Julian Wachner. She performed in 1989 at SUNY Purchase music by Vivaldi with the Master Singers of Westchester conducted by Les Robinson Hadsell, his Gloria, Magnificat and Beatus vir, alongside Rosa Lamoreaux. She appeared at Avery Fisher Hall in 1994 in Handel's Messiah with the Handel and Haydn Society, conducted by William Christie. In 1995 she sang with them, conducted by Christopher Hogwood, Bach's Missa in G minor and Handel's Dixit Dominus. She performed the premiere of a chamber work by Harbison, a The Seven Ages, which she sang in Boston, London, New York and San Francisco.

In 1995 she recorded music by Hildegard von Bingen with the ensemble Sequentia. She recorded Bach cantatas with Emmanuel Music, conducted by Craig Smith, and wrote translations for their performances. In 2002 she recorded a song cycle by Martin Boykan, A Packet for Susan (2000), with pianist Donald Berman. She recorded Harbison's WinterTale in 2012 with the Boston Modern Orchestra Project. In 2013 she recorded rarely performed Lieder, by Fanny Hensel, Hélène de Montgeroult and Louis Spohr. She is widely regarded for her "clarity of diction in German".

Dellal has been on the faculty of the Boston Conservatory, Brandeis University, and the Longy School of Music of Bard College, where she teaches voice and diction.

As a translator, she has translated Italian cantata texts from the 17th and 18th century, and several of Handel's operas. She has made English translations of all German text that Bach set to music.
