= Noah Greenberg Award =

American music award

The Noah Greenberg Award from the American Musicological Society is granted annually to musical scholars and performers in order to build relationships between the two and to encourage efforts in historical performance. The award was established by the trustees of the New York Pro Musica Antiqua in honor of their co-founder, Noah Greenberg. The winner receives a monetary prize ($2,000) and a certificate which is given at the Annual Business Meeting and Awards Presentation of the Society by the chair of the committee.

The first recipient was Richard Taruskin in 1978 for his recording of Johannes Ockeghem' Renaissance Missa prolationum. Past recipients include Musicians of the Old Post Road, a Boston-area early music ensemble, for their recording of Trios and Scottish Song Settings of J. N. Hummel in 1998, and Lori Kruckenberg, Michael Alan Anderson, and the Schola Antiqua of Chicago for Sounding the Neumatized Sequence in 2012.
