= Musicians of the Old Post Road =

Musicians of the Old Post Road (MOPR) is a chamber music ensemble based in the Boston area that specializes in period instrument performance. The ensemble often performs "rediscovered" works from the Baroque, Classical, and Romantic periods. The ensemble, founded by Artistic Directors Suzanne Stumpf and Daniel Ryan, performs in historical buildings along the Boston Post Road, which was a trade and travel route between Boston and New York City from the late 17th through mid-19th centuries. MOPR's repertoire spans these dates. The group has produced seven CDs, toured throughout Europe and North America, and received numerous awards, including the Noah Greenberg Award from the American Musicological Society in 1998.

== Notable performances and collaborations ==
MOPR has toured both within the US and internationally. US appearances include the Boston Early Music Festival Concert Series, and the Indianapolis Early Music Festival. International appearances include performances at the Tage Alter Musik, Germany, and El Museo Regional in Cuauhnáhuac, Mexico.

MOPR has collaborated with La Fontegara of Mexico, Schola Cantorum of Boston, and Pamela Dellal, mezzo soprano.

The ensemble was also commissioned to build a program to accompany an exhibit at the MIT Museum. In 2006, the ensemble was featured on Boston's WCVB television’s Chronicle program about the history of the old Boston Post Road.

== Rediscovered works and programming ==
The ensemble frequently performs lesser-known, rediscovered works. In a 2008 interview, Stumpf stated ¨We enjoy finding works not often selected for performance and combining it with interesting ways to present it to our audience.¨ The ensemble presents these rediscovered works within contextualized programs.

== Discography ==
- Roman Handel
- Feliz Navidad
- Telemann Twelve Fantasias and Other Works
- Telemann and Bodinus Quartets
- Galant with an Attitude: Music of Juan and José Pla
- Trios and Scottish Song Settings of J.N. Hummel. The ensemble won the 1998 Noah Greenberg Award for this recording.
- The Virtuoso Double Bass

== Members ==
The ensemble is composed of five core members: Suzanne Stumpf, flute, Daniel Ryan, cello, Sarah Darling, violin, Michael Bahmann, harpsichord, and Marcia Cassidy, viola.
