= 19th-Century Music =

- Discipline: Music
- Language: English
- Edited by: Lawrence Kramer

Publication details
- History: 1977–present
- Publisher: University of California Press (United States)
- Frequency: Triannual

Standard abbreviations
- ISO 4: 19th-Century Music

Indexing
- ISSN: 0148-2076 (print); 1533-8606 (web)
- LCCN: 77644140
- JSTOR: 01482076
- OCLC no.: 8973601

Links
- Journal homepage; Online access; Online archive

19th-Century Music is a triannual academic journal that "covers all aspects of Western art music composed in, leading to, or pointing beyond the 'long century' extending roughly from the 1780s to the 1930s".

It is published by the University of California Press and was established in 1977.

One of the last editor-in-chief was Lawrence Kramer. It's now Berthold Hoeckner, University of Notre Dame.

The journal covers very diverse topics ranging from music of any type or origin to issues of composition, performance, social and cultural context, hermeneutics, aesthetics, music theory, analysis, documentation, gender, sexuality, history and historiography.

== Abstracting and indexing ==
The journal is indexed in:

- Scopus
- Arts and Humanities Citation Index
- Current Contents/Arts & Humanities
- EBSCO databases
- ProQuest databases
