= The Journal of Musicology =

- Discipline: Musicology
- Language: English
- Edited by: Andrew Hicks, Elaine Kelly

Publication details
- History: 1982–present
- Publisher: University of California Press
- Frequency: Quarterly

Standard abbreviations
- ISO 4: J. Musicol.

Indexing
- ISSN: 0277-9269 (print); 1533-8347 (web)
- LCCN: 2001-214627
- JSTOR: 02779269
- OCLC no.: 45918209

Links
- Journal homepage

The Journal of Musicology is a quarterly peer-reviewed academic journal of musicology published by University of California Press. The journal was established in 1982 by Marian C. Green.
