= Roland John Wiley =

American musicologist

- Born: January 27, 1942 (age 84); California, US
- Awards: de la Torre Bueno Prize

Academic background
- Education: Stanford University; Harvard University

Academic work
- Discipline: musicology
- Main interests: 19th-century Russian music and ballet
- Notable works: The Life and Ballets of Lev Ivanov

Roland John Wiley (born January 27, 1942) is an American musicologist, instructor and consultant whose main area of focus is on 19th-century Russian music and ballet. He has written a biography and critical study on the music of Pyotr Ilyich Tchaikovsky and contributed the entry on the composer in the 2001 edition of the New Grove Dictionary of Music and Musicians. His ongoing project is a study of choreographer Marius Petipa.

== Career ==
A California native, Wiley was raised in Nevada before returning to California to attend Stanford University. A music major, he earned a Bachelor of Arts with departmental honors in choral conducting. He entered Harvard University in Massachusetts after a tour of military service. His dissertation at Harvard focused on Tchaikovsky's ballet Swan Lake, and he earned a Doctorate in 1974. Later that year he joined the faculty of the University of Michigan, where he teaches presently.

Wiley, dubbed "ballet's super sleuth" in 1984 by Boston Globe, was consulted by the Royal Opera House, Covent Garden, London for the Royal Ballet's revivals of Swan Lake and The Nutcracker. He has also done translation work for that theater, the Edinburgh Festival and the Dallas Opera. His research has taken him four times to Russia and the former USSR, under grant by the American Council of Learned Societies and in conjunction with the International Research and Exchanges Board. He has received other grants from the Guggenheim and Mellon Foundations and the National Endowment for the Humanities.

Wiley has published several books on Tchaikovsky, his colleagues and his work. Among them, 1997's The Life and Ballets of Lev Ivanov: Choreographer of 'The Nutcracker' and 'Swan Lake,' published through Oxford University Press, took the de la Torre Bueno Prize in 1998 for the best book in dance. 2009's Tchaikovsky, part of the Master Musicians series published by Oxford University Press, was critically well received. Michael Church of The Independent wrote, "Presenting life and art as parallel but separate strands, this coolly magisterial book scotches myths, accepts that some mysteries may never be solved, and builds up a picture of this profoundly conflicted man, and his wondrous music, which will probably never be bettered." The Washington Times, in its review, agreed that the book was "perhaps [the] definitive biography" of the composer, although reviewer John M. Taylor did qualify that the dense volume is a "fine book for the specialist, but not necessarily the best choice for your next air flight."

== Publications ==
=== Books ===
- Slavonic and Western Music: Essays for Gerald Abraham (Ann Arbor, Michigan: UMI Research Press, 1985 (reprint)). ISBN 0-8357-1594-9. (Editor, with Malcolm Hamrick)
- Tchaikovsky’s Ballets (Oxford and New York: Oxford University Press, 1985). ISBN 0-19-816249-9.
- The Life and Ballets of Lev Ivanov, Choreographer of The Nutcracker and Swan Lake (Oxford and New York: Oxford University Press, 1997). ISBN 0-19-816567-6.
- A Century of Russian Ballet: Documents and Eyewitness Accounts, 1816-1916 (Alton, Hampshire, UK: Dance Books Ltd., 2008 (reprint)) ISBN 1-85273-120-6.
- Master Musicians: Tchaikovsky (Oxford and New York: Oxford University Press, 2009). ISBN 0-19-536892-4.

=== Articles ===
- "The Tribulations of the Nationalist Composers: A Speculation Concerning Borrowed Music in Kovanschina." In Mussorgsky, in Memoriam, 1881-1981 (Volume 3 of Russian Music Studies) (Ann Arbor, Michigan: UMI Research Press, 1982). ISBN 0-8357-1295-8.
- Title not given. In John Milton Ward Research Materials Concerning the Theatre (Harvard Theater Collection, 1985). ISBN n/a.
- "Tchaikovsky, Pyotr Ilyich." In The New Grove Dictionary of Music and Musicians, Second Edition (London: Macmillan, 2001), 29 vols., ed. Sadie, Stanley. ISBN 1-56159-239-0.
