= John Warrack =

English music critic and oboist (born 1928)

John Hamilton Warrack (born 9 February 1928) is an English music critic, writer on music, and oboist.

== Career ==
Born in London, Warrack is the son of Scottish conductor and composer Guy Warrack and Jacynth Mary Ellerton. He was educated at Winchester College (1941–1946) and the Royal College of Music (1949–1952). In the early 1950s he was a freelance oboist, playing mostly with the Boyd Neel Orchestra and Sadler's Wells Orchestra. From 1954 until 1961 he was music critic for The Daily Telegraph, and from 1961 until 1972 for The Sunday Telegraph. From 1978 until 1983 he served as the artistic director of the Leeds Festival. From 1984 until 1993 he taught on the music faculty at the University of Oxford.

He is the author of Six Great Composers (1955); Carl Maria von Weber (Hamish Hamilton, 1968, 2nd ed. Cambridge UP, 1976), the standard study of Weber in English; German Opera: From the Beginnings to Wagner (2001) and the co-author of The Concise Oxford Dictionary of Opera (1964, with Harold Rosenthal) and The Concise Oxford Dictionary of Opera (1992, with Ewan West).

Warrack lives in Helmsley, North Yorkshire. He is the father of the stonemason Simon Warrack.
