= Music of Pyotr Ilyich Tchaikovsky =

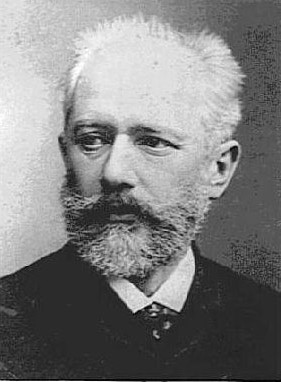
Russian composer Pyotr Ilyich Tchaikovsky

Pyotr Ilyich Tchaikovsky was a Russian composer especially known for three very popular ballets: Swan Lake, The Sleeping Beauty, and The Nutcracker. He also composed operas, symphonies, choral works, concertos, and various other classical works. His work became dominant in 19th century Russia, and he became known both in and outside Russia as its greatest musical talent.

== Tchaikovsky and his times ==
While the contributions of the Russian nationalistic group The Five were important in their own right in developing an independent Russian voice and consciousness in classical music, Tchaikovsky's formal conservatory training allowed him to write works with Western-oriented attitudes and techniques, showcasing a wide range and breadth of technique from a poised "Classical" form simulating 18th century Rococo elegance to a style more characteristic of Russian nationalists or a musical idiom expressly to channel his own overwrought emotions.

Even with this compositional diversity, the outlook in Tchaikovsky's music remains essentially Russian, both in its use of native folk song and its composer's deep absorption in Russian life and ways of thought. Writing about Tchaikovsky's ballet The Sleeping Beauty in an open letter to impresario Sergei Diaghilev that was printed in the Times of London, composer Igor Stravinsky contended that Tchaikovsky's music was as Russian as Pushkin's verse or Glinka's song, since Tchaikovsky "drew unconsciously from the true, popular sources" of the Russian race. This Russianness of mindset ensured that Tchaikovsky would not become a mere imitator of Western technique. Tchaikovsky's natural gift for melody, based mainly on themes of tremendous eloquence and emotive power and supported by matching resources in harmony and orchestration, has always made his music appealing to the public. However, his hard-won professional technique and the power to harness it to express his emotional life gave Tchaikovsky the ability to realize his potential more fully than any other Russian composer of his time.

== Ballets ==
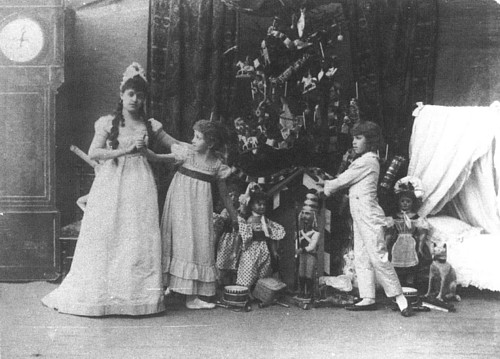
Original cast in the Imperial Ballet's original production of Tchaikovsky's ballet The Nutcracker, December 1892

"Tchaikovsky was made for ballet," writes musicologist David Brown Before him, musicologist Francis Maes writes, ballet music was written by specialists, such as Ludwig Minkus and Cesare Pugni, "who wrote nothing else and knew all the tricks of the trade." Brown explains that Tchaikovsky's gift for melody and orchestration, his ability to write memorable dance music with great fluency and his responsiveness to a theatrical atmosphere made him uniquely qualified in writing for the genre. Above all, Brown writes, he had "an ability to create and sustain atmosphere: above all, a faculty for suggesting and supporting movement ... animated by an abundant inventiveness, above all rhythmic, within the individual phrase." In comparing Tchaikovsky to French composer Léo Delibes, whose ballets Tchaikovsky adored, Brown writes that while the two composers shared similar talents, the Russian's passion places him in a higher league than that of the Frenchman. Where Delibes' music remains decorative, Tchaikovsky's touches the senses and achieves a deeper significance. Tchaikovsky's three ballets, Maes says, forced an aesthetic re-evaluation of music for that genre.

Brown calls Tchaikovsky's first ballet, Swan Lake, "a very remarkable and bold achievement." The genre on the whole was mainly "a decorative spectacle" when Swan Lake was written, which made Tchaikovsky's attempt to "incorporate a drama that was more than a convenient series of incidents for mechanically shifting from one divertissement to the next ... almost visionary." However, while the composer showed considerable aptitude in writing music that focused on the drama of the story, the demand for set pieces undercut his potential for complete success. The lengthy divertissements he supplied for two of the ballet's four acts display a "commendable variety of character" but divert action (and audience attention) away from the main plot. Moreover, Brown adds, the formal dance music is uneven, some of it "quite ordinary, a little even trite." Despite these handicaps, Swan Lake gives Tchaikovsky many opportunities to showcase his talent for melodic writing and, as Brown points out, has proved "indestructible" in popular appeal. The oboe solo associated with Odette and her swans, which first appears at the end of Act 1, is one of the composer's best–known themes.

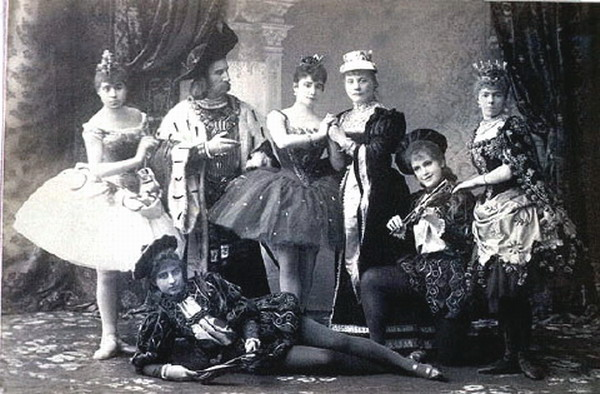
Original cast of Tchaikovsky's ballet, The Sleeping Beauty, Saint Petersburg, 1890

Tchaikovsky considered his next ballet, The Sleeping Beauty, one of his finest works, according to Brown. The structure of the scenario proved more successful than that of Swan Lake. While the prologue and first two acts contain a certain number of set dances, they are not designed for gratuitous choreographic decoration but have at least some marginal relevance to the main plot. These dances are also far more striking than their counterparts in Swan Lake, as several of them are character pieces from fairy tales such as Puss in Boots and Little Red Riding Hood, which elicited a far more individualized type of invention from the composer. Likewise, the musical ideas in these sections are more striking, pointed and precise. This characterful musical invention, combined with a structural fluency, a keen feeling for atmosphere and a well-structured plot, makes The Sleeping Beauty perhaps Tchaikovsky's most consistently successful ballet.

The Nutcracker, on the other hand, is one of Tchaikovsky's best known works. While it has been criticized as the least substantial of the composer's three ballets, it should be remembered that Tchaikovsky was restricted by a rigorous scenario supplied by Marius Petipa. This scenario provided no opportunity for the expression of human feelings beyond the most trivial and confined Tchaikovsky mostly within a world of tinsel, sweets and fantasy. Yet, at its best, the melodies are charming and pretty, and by this time Tchaikovsky's virtuosity at orchestration and counterpoint ensured an endless fascination in the surface attractiveness of the score.

== Operas ==
Tchaikovsky completed ten operas, although one (Undina) is mostly lost and another (Vakula the Smith) exists in two significantly different versions. He also began or considered writing at least 20 others; he once declared that to refrain from writing operas was a heroism he did not possess. (In fact, one project Tchaikovsky had planned before his death was an opera based on Shakespeare's Romeo and Juliet, for which he had written an overture-fantasia much earlier in his career; a duet intended potentially for this opera was completed by his friend Sergei Taneyev and published posthumously.) Nevertheless, this need to plan or compose an opera was a constant preoccupation.

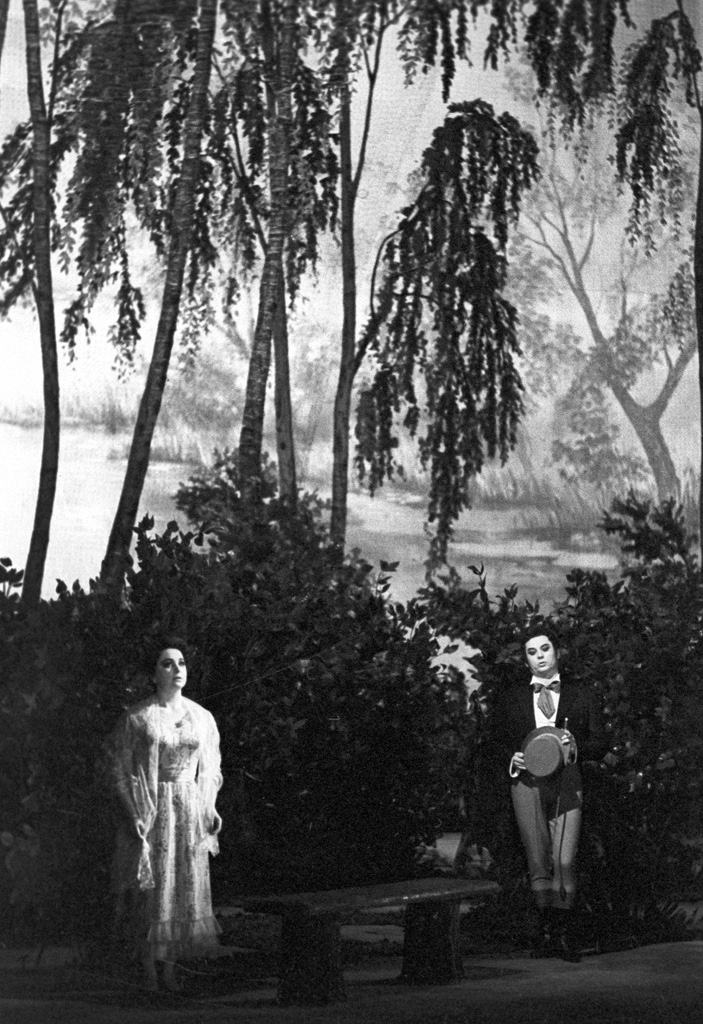
Tamara Milashkina and Yury Mazurok in a scene from Eugene Onegin

According to musicologist Gerald Abraham, the operas on the whole embody an enormous mass of music far too beautiful and interesting to be ignored. Moreover, he maintains, Tchaikovsky's search for operatic subjects, along with his views on their nature and treatment and his own work on librettos, throw considerable light on his creative personality. Nevertheless, according to musicologist Francis Maes, most of Tchaikovsky's operas failed for three reasons. First, the composer could not get good librettos, despite continued requests to some of Russia's leading playwrights and his brother Modest. Second, he was no Verdi, Puccini or Leoncavallo. While he could write music that was often beautiful and sometimes very moving, it was generally not as arresting dramatically as anything those three provided. Third, and perhaps most sadly, Tchaikovsky's enthusiasm for opera writing did not match his theatrical sense. Apparently either unaware of this deficiency or unable to curb his excitement long enough to take a cold, hard look at the true stage-worthiness of a libretto, he seemed destined to repeat his failures.

Tchaikovsky broke this pattern twice. Eugene Onegin and The Queen of Spades were both strong stories, worthy of setting to music. Their author, Alexander Pushkin was a master storyteller. He was also a keen observer of human nature and his wry, penetrating observations of the human condition could be chilling and heart-breaking in the extreme. Moreover, both stories were a perfect match for the composer's talents. Tchaikovsky matched Pushkin's irony and detachment in Eugene Onegin, falling back on a series of musical conventions that, in turn, echoed the literary codes the author used in his "novel in verse." More traditional writers, such as Brown, also suggest that a passion and sympathy by the composer for the heroine, Tatiyana, heightened by parallels in the story to events in his own life, may have influenced the quality of music he supplied for Onegin.

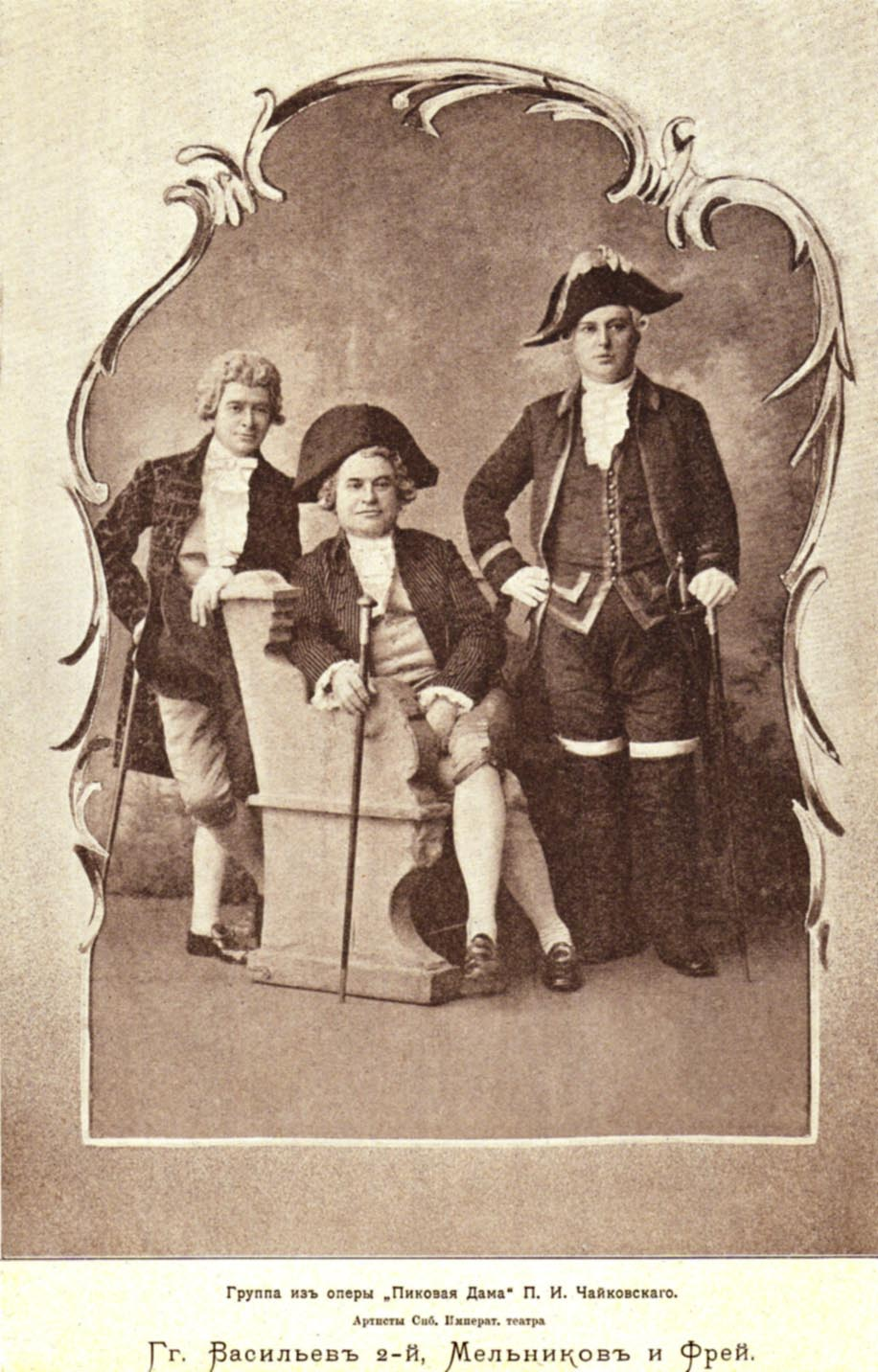
Vasily Vasiliev, Ivan Melnikov and Yalmar Frei in The Queen of Spades

With The Queen of Spades, Modest's transposition of the story's timeline in the libretto to the 18th century was a boon for Tchaikovsky, whose favorite composer (and the one he most liked to emulate) was Mozart. The change allowed him to compose, in addition to impassioned love music, a number of 18th century pastiches depicting various social milieus. Also, as the supernatural gradually takes possession of the characters, Tchaikovsky matches it with equally ghostly music. He had already experimented in this vein in the transformation scene of The Sleeping Beauty showing an adeptness for orchestrating a strange, even unnerving sound world of dark fantasy. He would do so again in Act One of The Nutcracker, capturing what artist, critic and historian Alexandre Benois would call a "world of captivating nightmares" and "a mixture of strange truth and convincing invention."

- The Voyevoda (Воевода – The Voivode, Op. 3, 1867–1868)

Full score destroyed by composer, but posthumously reconstructed from sketches and orchestral parts. Not related to the much later symphonic ballad The Voyevoda, Op. 78.

- Undina (Ундина or Undine, 1869)

Not completed. Only a march sequence from this opera saw the light of day, as the second movement of his Symphony No. 2 in C minor and a few other segments are occasionally heard as concert pieces. While Tchaikovsky revised the Second Symphony twice in his lifetime, he did not alter the second movement (taken from the Undina material) during either revision. The rest of the score of Undina was destroyed by the composer.

- The Oprichnik (Опричник), 1870–1872

Premiere 24 April [OS 12 April], 1874, Saint Petersburg

- Vakula the Smith (Кузнец Вакула or Kuznets Vakula), Op. 14, 1874;

Revised later as Cherevichki, premiere 6 December [OS 24 November], 1876, Saint Petersburg

- Eugene Onegin (Евгений Онегин or Yevgeny Onegin), Op. 24, 1877–1878

Premiere 29 March [OS 17 March], 1879 at the Moscow Conservatory

- The Maid of Orleans (Орлеанская дева or Orleanskaya deva), 1878–1879

Premiere 25 February [OS 13 February], 1881, Saint Petersburg

- Mazepa (or Mazeppa) (Мазепа), 1881–1883

Premiere 15 February [OS 3 February], 1884, Moscow

- Cherevichki (Черевички; revision of Vakula the Smith) 1885

Premiere 31 January [OS 19 January], 1887, Moscow)

- The Enchantress (or The Sorceress, Чародейка or Charodeyka), 1885–1887

Premiere 1 November [OS 20 October], 1887, Saint Petersburg

- The Queen of Spades (Пиковая дама or Pikovaya dama), Op. 68, 1890

Premiere 19 December [OS 7 December], 1890, Saint Petersburg

- Iolanta (Иоланта or Iolanthe), Op. 69, 1891

First performance: Mariinsky Theatre, Saint Petersburg, 1892. Originally performed on a double-bill with The Nutcracker

(Note: A "Chorus of Insects" was composed for the projected opera Mandragora [Мандрагора] of 1870).

== Symphonies ==
Tchaikovsky's first three symphonies, while seemingly optimistic and nationalistic, are also chronicles of his attempts to reconcile his training from the Saint Petersburg Conservatory with Russian folk music and his own innate penchant for melody. Both worked against sonata form, the paramount architectural concept in Western classical music, not with it. (Note: Mozart and Beethoven's themes, by comparison, may not seem striking or beautiful but by design work well as germ-cells for growth and development. The emphasis is architectural—not on the theme itself but on what can be built from it (Cooper, 29).) The First, while conventional in form, shows Tchaikovsky's individuality strongly; it is rich in melodic invention and exudes Mendelssohnian charm and grace. The Second Symphony is among the more accessible of Tchaikovsky's works and exists in two versions. While the latter version is the one generally performed today, Tchaikovsky's friend and former student Sergei Taneyev considered the earlier one to be finer compositionally speaking. The Third, the only symphony Tchaikovsky completed in a major key, is written in five movements, similar to Robert Schumann's Rhenish Symphony, shows Tchaikovsky alternating between writing in a more orthodox symphonic manner and writing music as a vehicle to express his emotional life; with the introduction of dance rhythms into every movement except the slow one, the composer widens the field of symphonic contrasts both within and between movements.

Finale from Symphony No. 4
Performed by the U.S. Navy Band in an arrangement for wind ensemble by V.F. Safranek

With the last three numbered symphonies and his program symphony Manfred, Tchaikovsky became one of the few composers in the late 19th century who could impose his personality upon the symphony to give the form new life. Brown calls the Fourth Symphony a breakthrough work in terms of emotional depth and complexity, particularly in its very large opening movement. The Fifth Symphony is a more regular work, though perhaps not a more conventional one. The Sixth Symphony, generally interpreted as a declaration of despair, is a work of prodigious originality and power; to Brown, it is perhaps one of Tchaikovsky's most consistent and perfectly composed works. These symphonies are recognized as highly original examples of symphonic form and are frequently performed. Manfred, written between the Fourth and Fifth Symphonies, is also a major piece, as well as a demanding one. The music is often very tough, the first movement completely original in form, while the second movement proves diaphanous and seemingly unsubstantial but absolutely right for the program it illustrates.

Tchaikovsky sketched the Symphony in E♭ in 1892, before beginning the Pathetique, but discarded it as unsatisfactory. After finishing the Pathetique, he recycled the opening movement as his Third Piano Concerto, which was left as a single-movement Allegro de concert upon his death. Although the composer's friend and colleague Sergei Taneyev completed the slow movement and finale for piano and orchestra and these are sometimes combined with the single-movement work to form a full-length concerto, it remains unclear whether this was actually the composer's intent. The symphony was reconstituted in what is believed to be its original form by Russian composer Semyon Bogatyriev; it was published in 1961 after a 10-year period of reconstruction.

- No. 1 in G minor, Op. 13, Winter Daydreams (1866)
- No. 2 in C minor, Op. 17, Little Russian (1872)
- No. 3 in D major, Op. 29, Polish (1875)
- No. 4 in F minor, Op. 36 (1877–1878)
- Manfred Symphony, B minor, Op. 58; inspired by Byron's poem Manfred (1885)
- No. 5 in E minor, Op. 64 (1888)
- No. 6 in B minor, Op. 74, Pathétique (1893)
- Symphony in E♭ (reconstructed by Semyon Bogatyrev; published in 1961 as Symphony No. 7)

== Concertos and concertante pieces ==
Two of Tchaikovsky's concertos were rebuffed by their respective dedicatees but became among the composer's best-known works. The First Piano Concerto suffered an initial rejection by its intended dedicatee, Nikolai Rubinstein, as the composer notably recounted three years later. The work went instead to pianist Hans von Bülow, whose playing had impressed Tchaikovsky when he appeared in Moscow in March 1874. Bulow premiered the work in Boston in October 1875. Rubinstein eventually championed the work himself. Likewise, the Violin Concerto was rejected initially by noted virtuoso and pedagogue Leopold Auer, was premiered by another soloist (Adolph Brodsky), then belatedly accepted and played to great public success by Auer. In addition to playing the concerto himself, Auer would also teach the work to his students, including Jascha Heifetz and Nathan Milstein.

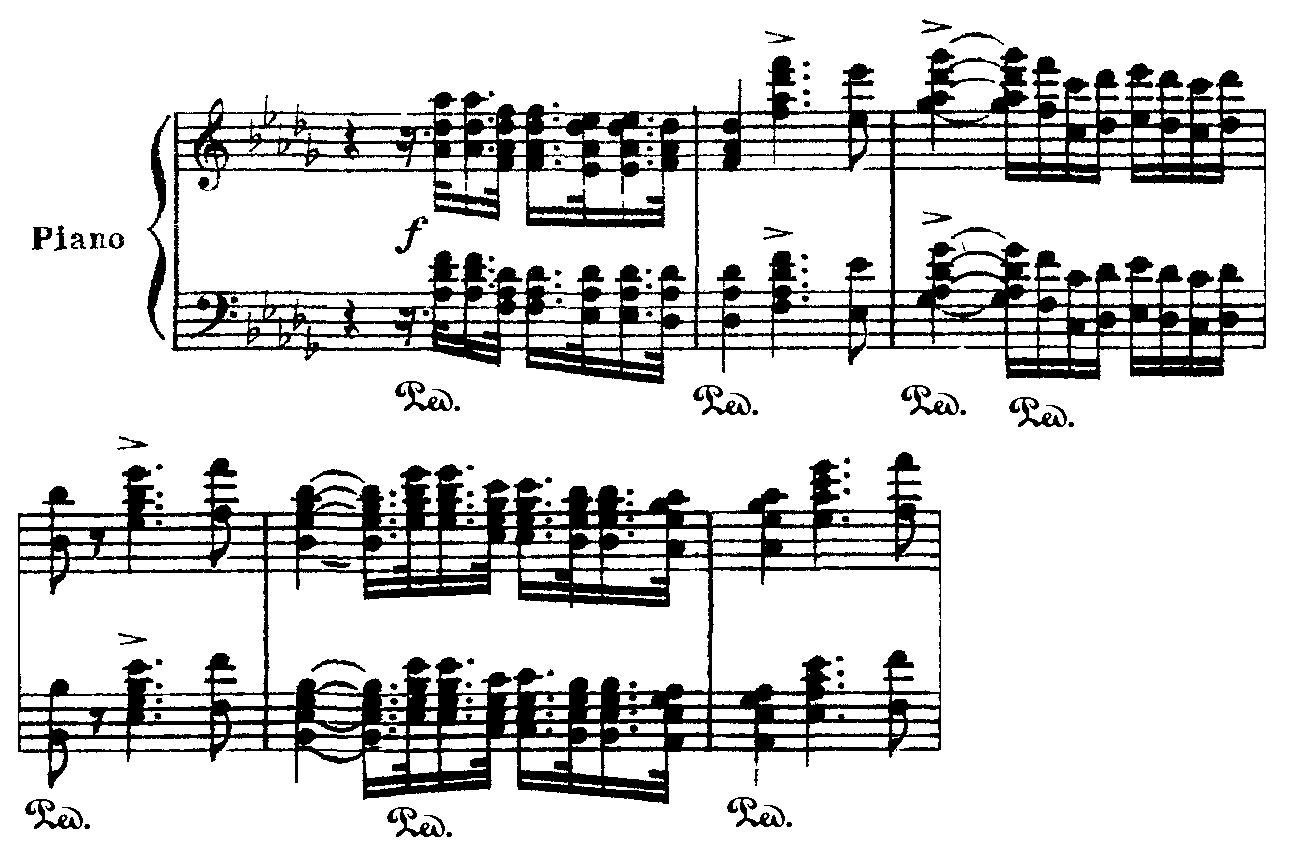
Main theme of the First Piano Concerto, (piano part)

Altogether, Tchaikovsky wrote four concertos (three for piano, one for violin), two concertante works for soloist and orchestra (one each for piano and cello) and a couple of short works. The First Piano Concerto, while faulted traditionally for having its opening melody in the wrong key and never restating that tune in the rest of the piece, shows an expert use of tonal instability to enhance tension and increase the tone of restlessness and high drama. The Violin Concerto, one of Tchaikovsky's freshest-sounding and least pretentious works, is filled with melodies that could have easily come from one of his ballets. The Second Piano Concerto, more formal in tone and less extroverted than the First, contains prominent solos for violin and cello in its slow movement, giving the impression of a concerto grosso for piano trio and orchestra. The Third Piano Concerto, initially the opening movement of a symphony in E♭, was left on Tchaikovsky's death as a single-movement composition. Tchaikovsky also promised a concerto for cello to Anatoliy Brandukov and one for flute to Paul Taffanel but died before he could work on either project in earnest. (Note: A conjectural version of the former has since appeared. Another work for cello and orchestra was assembled in 1940 by cellist Gaspar Cassadó from some of Tchaikovsky's Op. 72 piano works.)

Of the concertante works, the Variations on a Rococo Theme for cello and orchestra was inspired by Mozart and shows Tchaikovsky's affinity for Classical style in its tastefulness and refined poise. The Concert Fantasia for piano and orchestra is related in its light tone and unorthodox formal structure to the orchestral suites. (The second movement, "Contrastes", had in fact originally been intended as the opening movement of the Third Suite.) Written as a display piece for the soloist, it hearkens back to a time when audiences concentrated more on the virtuosity of the performer than on the musical content of the piece being played. The Andante and Finale for piano and orchestra was completed and orchestrated posthumously by Sergei Taneyev. It was originally the second and fourth movements of the E♭ symphony, the same source as the Third Piano Concerto.

Miscellaneous works include the following:

- Sérénade mélancolique, Op. 26, for violin and orchestra.

As with the Violin Concerto, this was dedicated to Leopold Auer but premiered by Adolph Brodsky, and the dedication to Auer was withdrawn

- Valse-Scherzo, Op. 34, for violin and orchestra

Dedicated to violinist Iosif Kotek, who assisted Tchaikovsky in composing the Violin Concerto, in part to make amends for not dedicating that work to Kotek.

- Souvenir d'un lieu cher, Op. 42

Written in three short movements, the opening movement was the original slow movement of the Violin Concerto which Tchaikovsky replaced with the Canzonetta currently in that work.

- Pezzo capriccioso, Op. 62, (1888), for cello and orchestra

Written for Anatoliy Brandukov in the somber key of B minor (the same key as the Pathétique Symphony), the composition's capriccioso aspect comes from Tchaikovsky's fanciful treatment of the work's simple theme.

- Cello concerto

A conjectural work based in part on a 60-bar fragment found on the back of the rough draft for the last movement of the composer's Sixth Symphony.

- Concertstück for Flute and Strings, TH 247 Op. posth. (1893)

This piece, lost for 106 years, was found in Saint Petersburg in 1999 and reconstructed by James Strauss.

== Other orchestral works ==
=== Program music and commissioned pieces ===
Tchaikovsky wrote programmatic music throughout his career. While he complained to his patroness, Nadezhda von Meck, that doing so seemed like offering the public "paper money" as opposed to the "gold coin" of absolute music, he displayed a definite flair for the genre. The fantasy-overture Romeo and Juliet remains one of Tchaikovsky's best known works and its love theme among his most successful melodies. The piece, however, is actually one of three he wrote after works by Shakespeare. The Tempest, while not as successful overall as Romeo, contains a love theme that is extremely effective. Hamlet differs from Romeo in depicting different emotional or psychological states of the title character rather than portraying specific events, an approach more akin to Franz Liszt in his symphonic poems.

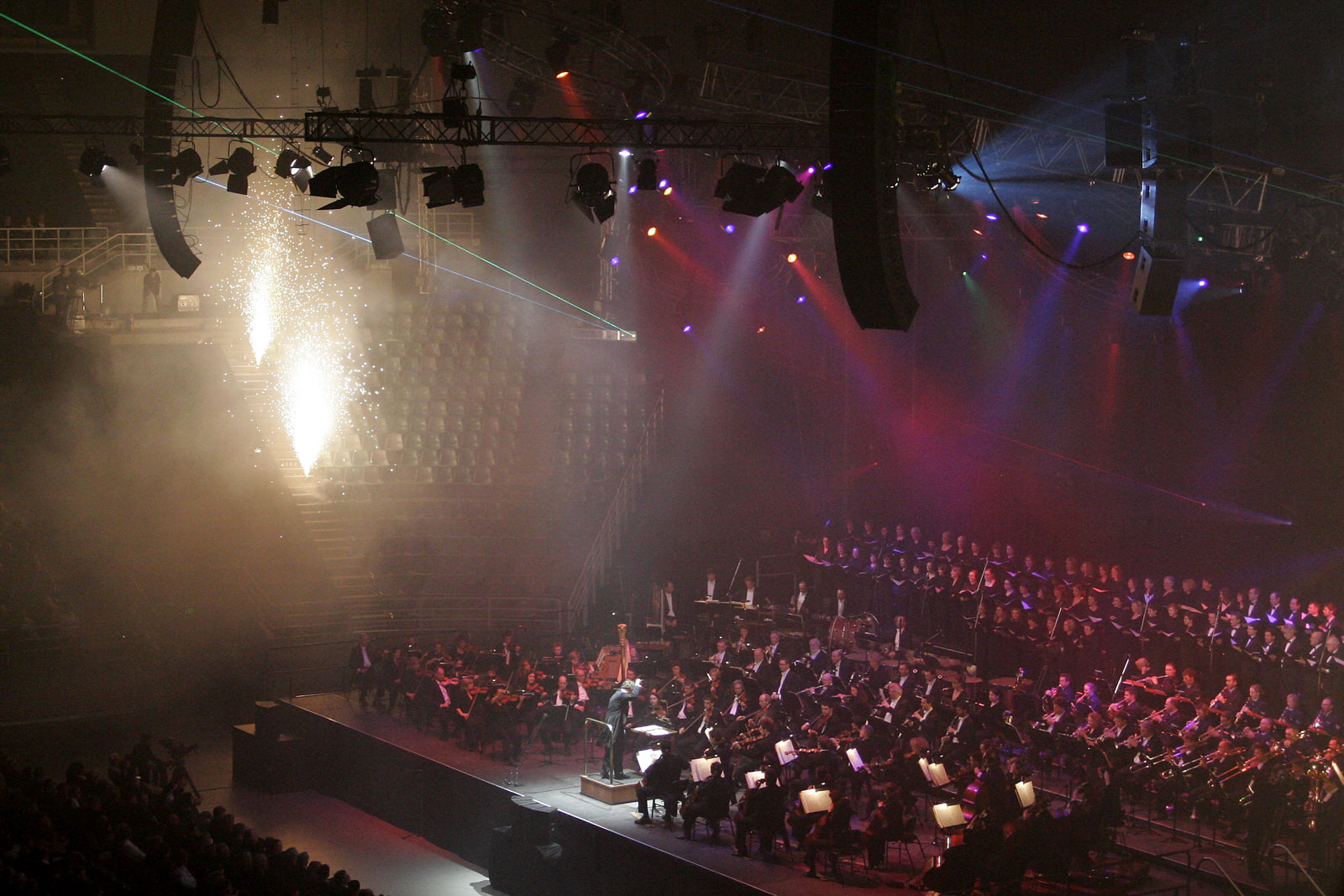
The 1812 overture complete with cannon fire was performed at the 2005 Classical Spectacular

Among the other works, Capriccio Italien is a travelogue of the composer's time there during his years of wandering and a conscious emulation of the Mediterranean episodes in Glinka's Spanish Overtures. Francesca da Rimini contains a love theme in its central section that is one of Tchaikovsky's best examples of "unending melody." The composer was particularly fond of this work and conducted it often, most notably at Cambridge when he received his honorary doctorate in 1892. He was more ambivalent about his program symphony Manfred, inspired by Byron's poem of the same name and written to a program supplied by Balakirev. Written in four movements and for the largest orchestra Tchaikovsky employed, the piece remains a rarity in the concert hall but is being recorded with increasing frequency. The Storm and Fatum are early works; The Voyevoda dates from the same period as the Pathetique symphony.

Commissioned works include the 1812 Overture, known for its traditional Russian themes (such as the old Tsarist National Anthem) and its 16 cannon shots and chorus of church bells in the coda. Though Tchaikovsky did not value the piece highly, it has become perhaps his most widely known composition. Marche Slave (otherwise known as the Slavonic March) is a patriotic piece commissioned for a Red Cross benefit concert to support Russian troops in the Balkans. Other commissioned works include a Festival Overture on the Danish National Anthem, written to commemorate the wedding of Crown Prince Alexander (who would become Alexander III), and a Festival Coronation March, ordered by the city of Moscow for the coronation of Alexander III.

=== Orchestral suites and Serenade ===
Tchaikovsky wrote four orchestral suites in the period between his Fourth and Fifth Symphonies. The first three are original music, while the fourth, subtitled Mozartiana, consists of arrangements of music by Mozart. (Note: Because of the difference in musical content, Tchaikovsky intended Mozartiana to stand as a separate work. It was numbered with the other three suites after his death.) According to Dutch musicologist Francis Maes, Tchaikovsky valued the freedom the suites gave him to experiment and saw them as a genre for unrestricted musical fantasy. To this Russian musicologist and critic Daniel Zhitomirsky agrees and adds that through them, the composer solved a number of challenges in orchestral tonality, thematic development and form. Roland John Wiley comments that they contain music in a number of styles—scholarly counterpoint, salon style, folk music, bizarre scherzos, character pieces—in an overall vein that Russians call prelest, which means "charming" or "pleasing".

- Orchestral Suite No. 1 in D minor, Op. 43 (1878–1879)
- Orchestral Suite No. 2 in C major, Op. 53 (1883)
- Orchestral Suite No. 3 in G major, Op. 55 (1884)
- Orchestral Suite No. 4 in G major "Mozartiana", Op. 61 (1887)

In addition to the above suites, Tchaikovsky made a short sketch for a Suite in 1889 or 1890, which was not subsequently developed.

Tchaikovsky himself arranged the suite from the ballet The Nutcracker. He also considered making suites from his two other ballets, Swan Lake and The Sleeping Beauty. He ended up not doing so, but after his death, others compiled and published suites from these ballets.

Like Capriccio Italien, the Serenade for Strings was inspired by Tchaikovsky's time in Italy and shares that work's relaxed buoyancy and melodic richness. The first movement, "Pezzo in forma di Sonatina" ("In the form of a sonatina"), was an homage to Mozart. It shares some formal features with that composer's Overture to Le Nozze di Figaro but otherwise emulates his music only in wit and lightness, not in style.

=== Incidental music ===
- Dmitri the Pretender and Vassily Shuisky (1867), incidental music to Alexander Ostrovsky's play Dmitri the Pretender
- The Snow Maiden (Snegurochka), Op. 12 (1873), incidental music for Ostrovsky's play of the same name. Ostrovsky adapted and dramatized a popular Russian fairy tale, and the score that Tchaikovsky wrote for it was always one of his own favorite works. It contains much vocal music, but it is not a cantata or an opera.
- Montenegrins Receiving News of Russia's Declaration of War on Turkey (1880), music for a tableau.
- The Voyevoda (1886), incidental music for the Domovoy scene from Ostrovsky's A Dream on the Volga
- Hamlet, Op. 67b (1891), incidental music for Shakespeare's play. The score uses music borrowed from Tchaikovsky's overture of the same name, as well as from his Symphony No. 3, and from The Snow Maiden, in addition to original music that he wrote specifically for a stage production of Hamlet. The two vocal selections are a song that Ophelia sings in the throes of her madness, and a song for the First Gravedigger to sing as he goes about his work.

== Choral music ==
Tchaikovsky wrote a considerable quantity of choral music (about 25 items), including:

- Cantata (Hymn) on the Occasion of the Celebration of the 50th Jubilee of the Singer Osip Afanasievich Petrov, tenor, chorus and orchestra, words by Nikolay Nekrasov (1875; performed at the St Petersburg Conservatory on 6 May 1876, under the conductor Karl Davydov)
- Liturgy of St John Chrysostom, Op. 41 (1878)
- All-Night Vigil, Op. 52 (1881)

== Chamber music ==
Chamber music does not figure prominently in Tchaikovsky's compositional output. Other than a number of student exercises, it consists of three string quartets, a piano trio and a string sextet, along with three works for violin and piano. While all these works contain some excellent music, the First String Quartet, with its famous Andante cantabile slow movement, shows such mastery of quartet form that some consider it the most satisfying of Tchaikovsky's chamber works in its consistency of style and artistic interest. While the Second String Quartet is less engaging than the First and less characterful than the Third, its slow movement is a substantial and particularly affecting piece. Some critics consider the Third String Quartet the most impressive, especially for its elegiac slow movement.

Third movement from Souvenir de Florence
Performed by the U.S. Army Band

Also elegiac is the Piano Trio, written in memory of Nikolai Rubinstein—a point which accounts for the prominence of the piano part. The work is in two actual movements, the second a large set of variations including a fugue and a long summing-up variation serving as the equivalent of a third movement. Had Tchaikovsky written this work as a piano quartet or piano quintet, he would have availed himself of a string complement well able to play complete harmony and could therefore have been allotted autonomous sections to play. With only two stringed instruments, this option was not available. Instead, Tchaikovsky treats the violin and cello as melodic soloists, with the piano both conversing with them and providing harmonic support.

The String Sextet, entitled Souvenir de Florence, is considered by some to be more interesting than the Piano Trio, better music intrinsically and better written. None of Tchaikovsky's other chamber works has a more positive opening, and the simplicity of the main section of the second movement is even more striking. After this very affecting music, the third movement progresses at least initially into a fresh, folksy world. Even more folksy is the opening of the finale, though Tchaikovsky takes this movement in a more academic direction with the incorporation of a fugue. This work has also been played in arrangements for string orchestra.

== Solo piano music ==
Tchaikovsky wrote a hundred-odd piano works over the course of his creative life. His first opus comprised two piano pieces, while he completed his final set of piano works after he had finished sketching his last symphony. Except for a piano sonata written while he was a composition student and a second much later in his career, Tchaikovsky's solo piano works consist of character pieces. While his best known set of these works is The Seasons, the compositions in his last set, the Eighteen Pieces, Op. 72, are extremely varied and at times surprising.

Some of Tchaikovsky's piano works can be challenging technically; nevertheless, they are mostly charming, unpretentious compositions intended for amateur pianists. It would therefore be easy to dismiss the entire œuvre as mediocre and merely competent. While this view could hold true to some point, there is more attractive and resourceful music in some of these pieces than one might be inclined to expect. The difference between Tchaikovsky's pieces and many other salon works are patches of striking harmony and unexpected phrase structures which may demand some extra patience but will not remain unrewarded from a musical standpoint. Many of the pieces have titles which give imaginative pointers on how they should be played.

== Songs ==
Tchaikovsky wrote 103 songs. While he may not be remembered as a composer of lieder, he produced a larger number of superior works than their comparative neglect would suggest, often concentrating into a few pages a musical image that would seem to ideally match the substance of the text. The songs are extremely varied and encompass a wide range of genres—pure lyric and stark drama; solemn hymns and short songs of everyday life; folk tunes and waltzes. Tchaikovsky is most successful when writing on the subject of love and its loss or frustration

Technically, the songs are marked by several features: artistic simplicity, artlessness of musical language, variety and originality of melody and richness of accompaniment. The songs helped cross-pollinate the composer's work in other genres, with many of his operatic arias closely related to them. While None but the Lonely Heart may be one of his finest songs, as well as perhaps the best-known in the West, the Six Romances, Op. 65 and the Six Romances, Op. 73 are especially recommendable.

== Arrangements of the works of others ==
Arrangements of the works of others
Composer	Work and forces	Arranged for	Date
Beethoven	Piano Sonata No. 17 in D minor, Op. 31, No. 2, "Tempest", first movement	Orchestra (4 versions)	1863
Beethoven	Violin Sonata No. 9 in A, Op. 47 "Kreutzer", first movement	Orchestra	1863–64
Bortniansky	Complete Church Music, choir	Choir, edited	July – November 1881
Cimarosa	"Le faccio un inchino", trio from Il matrimonio segreto (available for 3 voices and piano)	3 voices and orchestra	1870
Dargomyzhsky	Little Russian Kazachok, orchestra	Piano	1868
Dargomyzhsky	"The golden cloud has slept", 3 voices and piano	3 voices and orchestra	1870
Dubuque	Maria Dagmar Polka, piano	Orchestra	1869
Glinka	"Slavsya" from A Life for the Tsar, arr, couplets	Mixed chorus and orchestra	February 1883
Joseph Gungl	Le Retour, waltz, piano	Orchestra	1863–64
Haydn	"Gott erhalte Franz den Kaiser", 4 voices	Orchestra	by 24 February 1874
Kral	"Ceremonial March", piano	Orchestra	May 1867
Herman Laroche	Karmosina, Fantasy Overture, piano	Orchestra	August – September 1888
Liszt	"Es war ein Konig in Thule", voice and piano	Voice and orchestra	3 November 1874
Alexei Lvov	"God Save the Tsar!" (the then national anthem), chorus and piano	Mixed chorus and orchestra	February 1883
Sophie Menter	Ungarische Zigeunerweisen, piano (short score)	Piano and orchestra	1892
Mozart	4 works	arr. orchestra as Mozartiana (Suite No. 4)	June – August 1887
Mozart	Fantasia in C minor, K. 475, piano	Vocal quartet (Night)	15 March 1893
Anton Rubinstein	Ivan the Terrible, Op. 79, orchestra	Piano duet	18 October – 11 November 1869
Anton Rubinstein	Don Quixote, Op. 87, orchestra	Piano duet	1870
Schumann	Symphonic Studies, Op. 13 (piano), Adagio and Allegro brillante	Orchestra	1864
Schumann	"Ballade vom Haidenknaben", Op. 122, No. 1, declamation and piano	Declamation and orchestra	11 March 1874
Stradella	"O del mio dolce", song with piano	Voice and orchestra	10 November 1870
Tarnovsky	Song "I remember all", arr. Dubuque for piano	Piano duet	1868
Weber	Piano Sonata in A♭, J. 199, Scherzo Menuetto	Orchestra	1863
Weber	Piano sonata in C, J. 138 – Perpetuum mobile	Piano left hand	1871

== See also ==
- Tchaikovsky in popular media

== Bibliography ==
- ed. Abraham, Gerald, Music of Tchaikovsky (New York: W.W. Norton & Company, 1946). ISBN n/a.
  - Abraham, Gerald, "Operas and Incidental Music"
  - Alshvang, A., tr. I. Freiman, "The Songs"
  - Cooper, Martin, "The Symphonies"
  - Dickinson, A.E.F., "The Piano Music"
  - Evans, Edwin, "The Ballets"
  - Mason, Colin, "The Chamber Music"
  - Wood, Ralph W., "Miscellaneous Orchestral Works"
- Brown, David, ed. Stanley Sadie, The New Grove Encyclopedia of Music and Musicians (London: Macmillan, 1980), 20 vols. ISBN 0-333-23111-2.
- Brown, David, Tchaikovsky: The Early Years, 1840–1874 (New York: W.W. Norton & Company, 1978). ISBN 0-393-07535-2.
- Brown, David, Tchaikovsky: The Crisis Years, 1874–1878, (New York: W.W. Norton & Company, 1983). ISBN 0-393-01707-9.
- Brown, David, Tchaikovsky: The Years of Wandering, 1878–1885, (New York: W.W. Norton & Company, 1986). ISBN 0-393-02311-7.
- Brown, David, Tchaikovsky: The Final Years, 1885–1893, (New York: W.W. Norton & Company, 1991). ISBN 0-393-03099-7.
- Brown, David, Tchaikovsky: The Man and His Music (New York: Pegasus Books, 2007). ISBN 0-571-23194-2.
- Figes, Orlando, Natasha's Dance: A Cultural History of Russia (New York: Metropolitan Books, 2002). ISBN 0-8050-5783-8 (hc.).
- Hanson, Lawrence and Hanson, Elisabeth, Tchaikovsky: The Man Behind the Music (New York: Dodd, Mead & Company). Library of Congress Catalog Card No. 66-13606.
- Holden, Anthony, Tchaikovsky: A Biography (New York: Random House, 1995). ISBN 0-679-42006-1.
- Maes, Francis, tr. Arnold J. Pomerans and Erica Pomerans, A History of Russian Music: From Kamarinskaya to Babi Yar (Berkeley, Los Angeles and London: University of California Press, 2002). ISBN 0-520-21815-9.
- Mochulsky, Konstantin, tr. Minihan, Michael A., Dostoyevsky: His Life and Work (Princeton: Princeton University Press, 1967). Library of Congress Catalog Card No. 65-10833.
- Poznansky, Alexander Tchaikovsky: The Quest for the Inner Man (New York: Schirmer Books, 1991). ISBN 0-02-871885-2.
- Rimsky-Korsakov, Nikolai, Letoppis Moyey Muzykalnoy Zhizni (St. Petersburg, 1909), published in English as My Musical Life (New York: Knopf, 1925, 3rd ed. 1942). ISBN n/a.
- Schonberg, Harold C. Lives of the Great Composers (New York: W.W. Norton & Company, 3rd ed. 1997).
- Steinberg, Michael, The Symphony (New York and Oxford: Oxford University Press, 1995).
- Tchaikovsky, Modest, Zhizn P.I. Chaykovskovo [Tchaikovsky's life], 3 vols. (Moscow, 1900–1902).
- Tchaikovsky, Pyotr, Perepiska s N.F. von Meck [Correspondence with Nadzehda von Meck], 3 vols. (Moscow and Leningrad, 1934–1936).
- Tchaikovsky, Pyotr, Polnoye sobraniye sochinery: literaturnïye proizvedeniya i perepiska [Complete Edition: literary works and correspondence], 17 vols. (Moscow, 1953–1981).
- Volkov, Solomon, tr. Bouis, Antonina W., St. Petersburg: A Cultural History (New York: The Free Press, a division of Simon & Schuster, Inc., 1995). ISBN 0-02-874052-1.
- Warrack, John, Tchaikovsky Symphonies and Concertos (Seattle: University of Washington Press, 1969). Library of Congress Catalog Card No. 78-105437.
- Warrack, John, Tchaikovsky (New York: Charles Scribner's Sons, 1973). SBN 684-13558-2.
- Wiley, Roland John, Tchaikovsky's Ballets (Oxford and New York: Oxford University Press, 1985). ISBN 0-19-816249-9.
- Zhitomirsky, Daniel, "Symphonies." In Russian Symphony: Thoughts About Tchaikovsky (New York: Philosophical Library, 1947). ISBN n/a.
