= Cello Concerto (Tchaikovsky) =

Work by Pyotr Ilyich Tchaikovsky

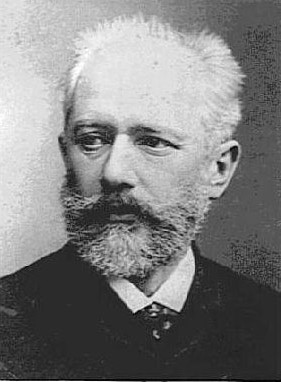
Pyotr Ilyich Tchaikovsky

The Cello Concerto of Pyotr Ilyich Tchaikovsky is a conjectural work based in part on a 60-bar fragment found on the back of the rough draft for the last movement of the composer's Sixth Symphony, the Pathétique.

This work is not to be confused with the Cello Concerto in E major that cellist Gaspar Cassadó arranged in 1940 from some of Tchaikovsky's Op. 72 piano works. (Note: No commercial recording of the Cassadó arrangement has so far been made and the score is currently out-of-print.)

== Structure ==
The work has three movements:

1. Allegro maestoso (B minor, sonata form)
  60-bar sketch is used as the first theme. Rest of the movement, including the second theme, is all new.
2. Andante (G major, ternary form)
  Sketch of the slow movement from Andante and Finale for piano and orchestra
3. Allegro vivo – Meno mosso – Presto (B minor, rondo form)
  Russian folk song "Our Wine Cellar" is used as a first theme, and an 8-bar sketch to the unfinished Cello Sonata as the second theme.

=== I. Allegro maestoso ===
The fragment Tchaikovsky left after his death, found in the Cajkovskij-Symposium and published by Schott Music, is more than 60 bars long. Much of the material has been crossed out. Since it was found on four sides of the rough draft of the Sixth Symphony, it has been previously thought to be the original opening of the symphony's finale. The music is notated on three systems, with the melody being noted on the upper system with the bass clef. The style is of genuine violin music. Nevertheless, the general character of this music, with orchestral accompaniment written on the two systems below it, infers that this fragment actually belongs to the cello concerto Tchaikovsky had promised to write.

No letters or commentary are currently available to show how Tchaikovsky would have structured this work.

=== II. Andante ===
As for the central andante, though Tchaikovsky's friend Sergei Taneyev arranged it for piano and orchestra after the composer's death, Tchaikovsky himself had left no indication as to how or whether to use this music; it was simply a discard from his abandoned Symphony in E flat, written prior to the Pathétique. Both Taneyev and Modest Tchaikovsky questioned at some length how the work should be presented—as an independent concert piece, as part of a two-movement concerto-type work, or in purely orchestral form. Also, once he and Modest decided how to proceed, Taneyev employed a solo cello in concert with the piano soloist, reminiscent of the "triple concerto" passages in the Second Piano Concerto. Therefore, using this music for solo cello and orchestra might not seem against the composer's intent.

=== III. Allegro vivo – Meno mosso – Presto ===
Though there is no idea whether Tchaikovsky would have used the Russian folk song "Our Wine Cellar" [Винный нашь колодезь] which opens this movement, he was at least familiar with it, having arranged it for piano four hands as No. 29 of his Fifty Russian Folk-Songs (1868–69).

An eight-bar theme in G major, found in one of the composer's notebooks, became the second theme of the concluding rondo. Headed "Allegro (idea for sonata with cello)", this theme is dated 24 November 1891.

== History ==
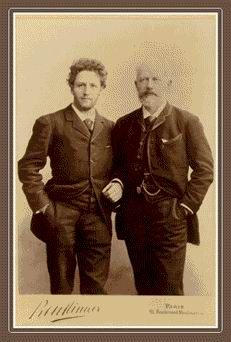
Tchaikovsky with cellist Anatoliy Brandukov

Tchaikovsky wrote to Léonce Détroyat on 20 June 1888 that he had promised to write concertos for piano, violin, cello and flute to several artists, including two in Paris—pianist Louis Diémer and flautist Paul Taffanel. By 1893, this list of projects also included an eleventh opera. (Note: This opera might have been based on Romeo and Juliet. This was a long-standing project the composer had wished to tackle, on a subject for which he had already written a fantasy-overture much earlier in his career.) Odessan journalist V. P. Sokolnikov remembered that during a visit to Odessa in early 1893, Tchaikovsky played through some sketches with cellist Vladimir Alois. However, nothing to confirm this account has yet come to light.

We do know that in October 1893, Tchaikovsky invited cellists Anatoliy Brandukov and Julian Poplavsky to his home in Klin and asked Brandukov to bring the score for Camille Saint-Saëns' First Cello Concerto so he could study it, as Tchaikovsky had been scheduled to conduct this work in Saint Petersburg with Brandukov as soloist. During this visit, Poplavsky and Brandukov took advantage of their host's good spirits and asked him to write them a cello concerto. Tchaikovsky said, "Why don't you play my Variations [on a Rococo Theme]?" Poplavsky mentioned the difficulty of offering the variations, and short cello pieces in general, instead of a full-length concerto. "You don't have to play in order to be annoying," Tchaikovsky joked"—but he also promised he would write a cello concerto. (Note: During this visit Tchaikovsky reportedly also told Poplavsky that he expected during October to write a flute concerto, a piece which he had already conceived, for Taffanel. After the composer's death, some very short sketches for this work were found among his manuscripts.) Within a month, however, the composer would be dead.

== Completions ==
In 2006, Ukrainian composer and cellist Yuriy Leonovich completed the work.

== Notes and references ==
Notes

Sources

- Holden, Anthony, Tchaikovsky: A Biography (New York: Random House, 1995). ISBN 0-679-42006-1
- Poplavsky, Julian, "Последний день П. И. Чайковского в Клину" (Tchaikovsky's last days at Klin), first published in the journal Artist (1894), No. 42, pp. 116–120
