= Symphony in E-flat (Tchaikovsky) =

Abandoned Symphony by Pyotr Ilyich Tchaikovsky

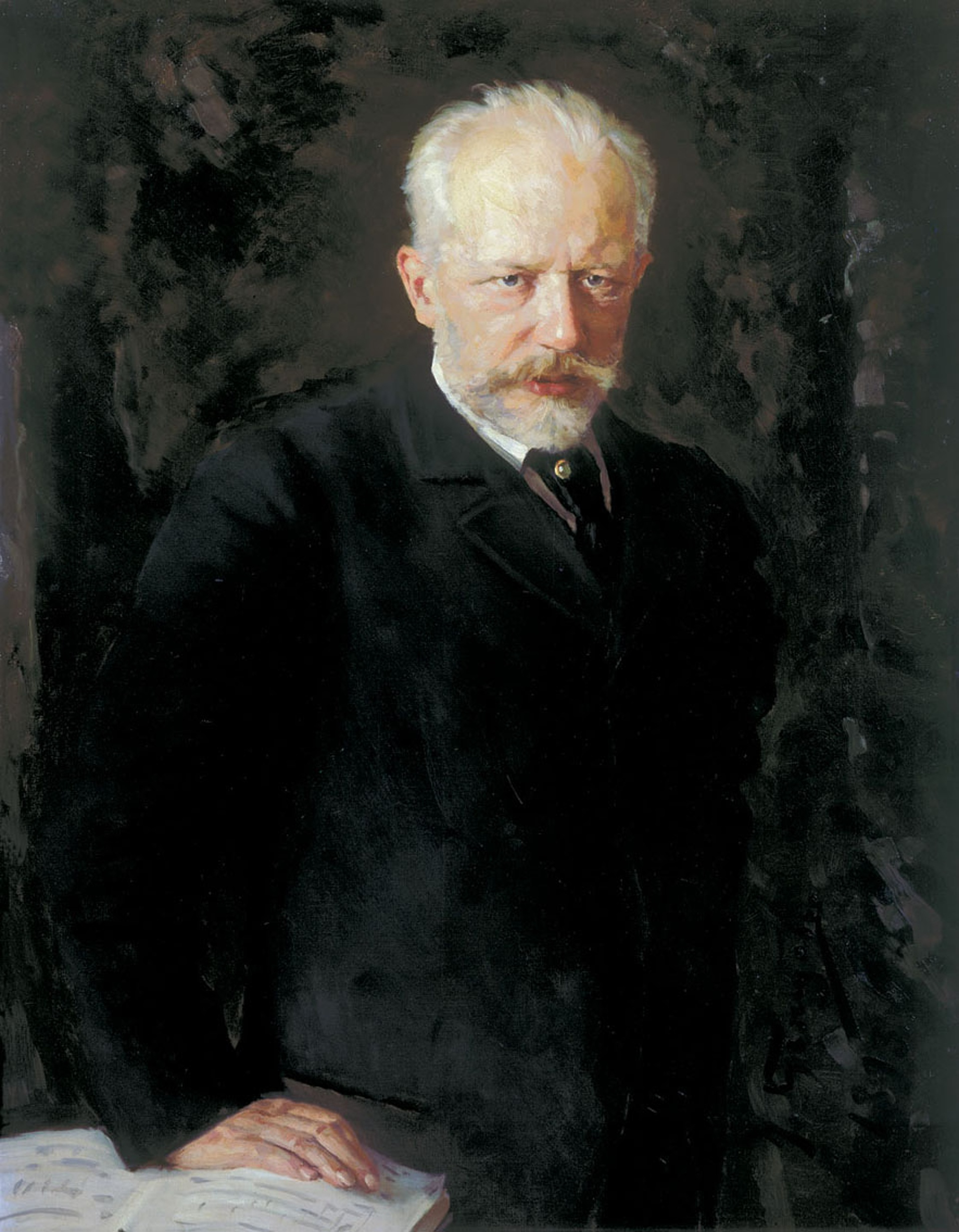
Pyotr Ilyich Tchaikovsky in 1893, as painted by Nikolai Kuznetzov

Pyotr Ilyich Tchaikovsky's Symphony in E♭ was commenced after Symphony No. 5, and was intended initially to be the composer's next (i.e. sixth) symphony. Tchaikovsky abandoned this work in 1892, only to reuse the first movement in the single-movement Third Piano Concerto, Op. 75, first performed and published after his death in 1895. Two other movements were reworked for piano and orchestra by Sergei Taneyev as the Andante and Finale, which was published as Tchaikovsky's Op. posth. 79 in 1897.

Between 1951 and 1955, Soviet composer Semyon Bogatyrev reconstructed the symphony from Tchaikovsky's sketches and various re-workings. This version was premiered on February 7, 1957, in Moscow by the Moscow Region Philharmonic Orchestra conducted by Mikhail Terian, and was published by the State Music Publishers in Moscow in 1961. It was first recorded by the Philadelphia Orchestra under Eugene Ormandy in 1962, soon after they gave the U.S. premiere of the work (February 16, 1962).

== The need to write ... ==
"I literally cannot live without working," Tchaikovsky once wrote to the Grand Duke Konstantin Konstantinovich, "For no sooner has some labor been completed ... there appears a desire to begin at once on some new labor.... [U]nder such circumstances this new labor is not always provoked by true creative necessity."

By November 1889, Tchaikovsky's creative itch was becoming extreme. A year had passed since completing the Fifth Symphony, and eight months since writing another musical composition. Tchaikovsky confided to the Grand Duke that he had long aspired to crown his creative career with a grand symphony on some as yet undefined programme, but it was evidently on his return voyage from America in May 1891 that he jotted down a few preliminary ideas for what might become such a piece. More important still was a programme he roughed out, possibly at the same time: "The ultimate essence ... of the symphony is Life. First part – all impulse, passion, confidence, thirst for activity. Must be short (the finale death – result of collapse). Second part love: third disappointments; fourth ends dying away (also short)."

During the following months, while at work on The Nutcracker and Iolanta, he continued to note down further materials, but when at last he began systematic work on the piece, many of these and earlier ideas were discarded; nor was the programme to be used. Others were drawn in, however, and by June 8, 1892, both the first movement and the finale were fully sketched. He had hoped to continue work in July and August, but further composition was delayed until October. Nevertheless, by November 4, 1892, the entire symphony was sketched, and within three days the first movement was scored up to the recapitulation.

Tchaikovsky had already offered to conduct the premiere of the symphony at a charity concert in Moscow the following February. However, after another enforced break, the composer took another look at the sketches and experienced total disenchantment. "It's composed simply for the sake of composing something; there's nothing at all interesting or sympathetic in it," he wrote to his nephew Vladimir "Bob" Davydov on December 16, 1892. "I've decided to discard and forget it ... Perhaps," he added, though he can hardly have realized how precisely, "the subject still has the potential to stir my imagination."

Davydov's response came quickly and, to the composer's surprise, very strongly worded. In a letter dated December 19, 1892, Davydov wrote, "I feel sorry of course, for the symphony that you have cast down from the cliff as they used to do with the children of Sparta, because it seemed to you deformed, whereas it is probably as much a work of genius as the first five."

== ... versus the need to express ==
Tchaikovsky gave up on the symphony because he now found the music impersonal, lacking the introspection he felt a symphony needed. He had no wish to continue making, as he said, "meaningless harmonies and a rhythmical scheme expressive of nothing".

However, Davydov's comments spurred Tchaikovsky to reuse the sketches instead of totally writing them off. The music may have meant nothing to him on a personal level emotionally, but that did not mean it was worthless. The main theme was highly attractive, skillfully worked out, extroverted. When worked out by a composer whose handling of such a theme could become a delight to hear and, for the musicologist, to analyze, the results could become extremely worthwhile after all.

More importantly, the composer did not abandon the thought of writing a new symphony based on the program he conceived. Though his efforts with the E♭ symphony did not turn out as planned, they influenced his conception of what would become the 6th Symphony (Pathétique), the first movement of which was fully sketched less than six weeks later, by 9 February 1893.

By April 1893, Tchaikovsky had also decided to rescore the E♭ Symphony as a piano concerto, his third. In June he did preliminary work on this project, while simultaneously pushing ahead with work on the 6th Symphony. By August he had decided the concerto was too long, and he wrote to Alexander Siloti saying that he would publish just the first movement, under the title of Allegro de concert or Conzertstuck. The 6th symphony was finished by the end of August. On 6 October he wrote to Zygmunt Stojowski, "I am now working on the scoring of my new (third) concerto for our dear Diémer. When you see him, please tell him that when I proceeded to work on it, I realized that this concerto is of depressing and threatening length. Consequently, I decided to leave only part one which in itself will constitute an entire concerto. The work will only improve the more since the last two parts were not worth very much". Three days later, in a letter to Bob Davydov (the dedicatee of the 6th Symphony), he again referred to the work as a concerto. By 15 October 1893 he had completely finished the recomposition. A note on the manuscript reads, "The end, God be thanked". But the last page was notated "End of movement 1", which has caused considerable speculation ever since. Had he decided that the 3rd Piano Concerto would have the usual three movements after all, but fate intervened before he could complete this work? The record favours the interpretation that he had decided on a single-movement concerto, despite the irregularity of this approach. Three weeks later, and only nine days after conducting the first performance of the 6th Symphony, which he had permitted after its premiere to be known as the Pathétique, Tchaikovsky was dead.

The one-movement Piano Concerto No. 3, Op. 75, Tchaikovsky's last completed composition, was published by Jurgenson the following year. It had its premiere in January 1895, with Sergei Taneyev as the soloist.

After considerable discussion between 1894 and 1896 between Tchaikovsky's brother Modest, Taneyev, Siloti, the publisher Belyayev and others, it was decided that Taneyev would convert two of the E♭ Symphony's abandoned three remaining movements into piano-and-orchestra form, starting with the very brief sketches Tchaikovsky had made along these lines before deciding not to proceed beyond the first movement. The Andante and Finale was premiered in January 1897, again with Taneyev at the piano. It was published later that year by Belyayev as Tchaikovsky's Op. 79, even though it was arguably as much Taneyev's composition as Tchaikovsky's. The 3rd Piano Concerto and the Andante and Finale are sometimes played and recorded together to constitute a full three-movement piano concerto, even though this was almost certainly not Tchaikovsky's final intention.

== Bogatyrev reconstruction ==
A reconstruction of the original symphony from the sketches and various reworkings was accomplished during 1951–1955 by the Soviet composer Semyon Bogatyrev, who brought the symphony into finished, fully orchestrated form and issued the score as Tchaikovsky's "Symphony No 7 in E♭ major."

Bogatyrev utilized primary sources, including Tchaikovsky's initial rough sketches, the full orchestral manuscript of about half of the first movement, and the manuscript and printed score of the 3rd Piano Concerto. The one-movement piano concerto was fully orchestrated by the composer, while the second and fourth movements were later orchestrated by Sergei Taneyev, Tchaikovsky's friend and fellow composer.

While the first movement sketches and completed version for piano and orchestra were essentially complete, Bogatyrev found that only 81 of the 204 bars of the second movement were in Tchaikovsky's hand. Here he utilized Tchaikovsky's piano score for the Andante for Piano and Orchestra, Taneyev's orchestration, and a very rough draft by Tchaikovsky.

For the third movement, Bogatyrev followed the insistence of the composer's brother Modest that this should be a scherzo, and orchestrated a scherzo from Tchaikovsky's Op. 72 piano pieces, as well as more sketches by the composer. Remarkably, the piece fits neatly between the second and fourth movements and even includes final chords that are echoed by the beginning of the fourth movement.

The reconstruction of the fourth movement was based on the piano score for the Finale for Piano and Orchestra, the composer's sketches, and the published orchestration by Taneyev.

=== Form ===
The Bogatyrev reconstruction follows the traditional four-movement pattern:

1. Allegro brillante (in E♭ major)
  This movement was used for the Third Piano Concerto, Op. posth. 75.
2. Andante (in B♭ major)
  Bogatyryev used the Andante from the Andante and Finale for Piano and Orchestra, Op. posth. 79, which had been constructed from Tchaikovsky's sketches by Sergei Taneyev. More recently, it was reused as the slow movement of a projected Cello Concerto.
3. Scherzo: Vivace assai (in E♭ minor)
  Perceiving that Tchaikovsky would have written a scherzo for this symphony, Bogatyryev orchestrated this piece from Tchaikovsky's Scherzo-Fantaisie, Op. 72, No. 10.
4. Finale: Allegro maestoso (in E♭ major)
  Bogatyryev used the Finale from the Andante and Finale.

=== Recordings ===
Eugene Ormandy and the Philadelphia Orchestra gave the American premiere on February 16, 1962, and made the first US recording for Columbia Records soon afterwards. The original LPs were released in stereo as MS 6349 and in mono as ML 5749. This recording was later digitally remastered and issued on CD. Eight other conductors have recorded it: Dmitri Kitayenko, Neeme Järvi, Sergei Skripka, Gennady Rozhdestvensky, Mikhail Pletnev, Kyung-Soo Won, Kees Bakels, and Leo Ginzburg.

== Tchaikovsky Fund reconstruction ==
In 2005, a second reconstruction of the symphony, commissioned by the Tchaikovsky Fund, was completed by Russian composer Pyotr Klimov. It had its first public performance at the Tchaikovsky State House-Museum in Klin, near Moscow, by the Symphony Orchestra of Russia led by conductor Tomomi Nishimoto.
