= Semyon Bogatyrev =

Russian composer (1890–1960)

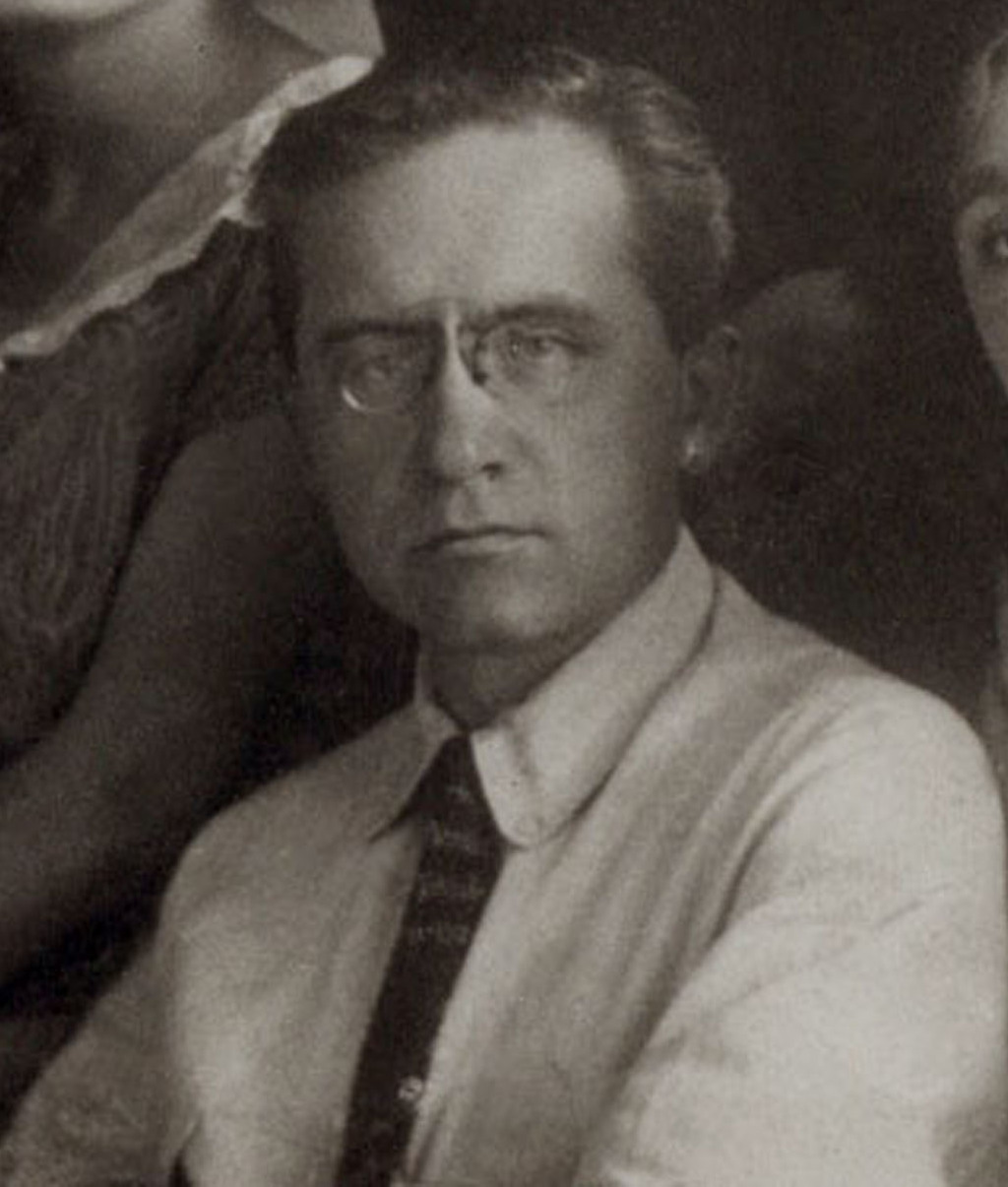
Semyon Bogatyrev

Semyon Semyonovich Bogatyrev (Russian: Семён Семёнович Богатырёв; 15 February 1890 – 31 December 1960) was a Soviet and Russian musicologist and composer.

He is best known in the West for his completion of Pyotr Ilyich Tchaikovsky's Symphony in E♭, which the composer had abandoned incomplete in 1892. In 1893 Tchaikovsky used the first movement as source material for his Piano Concerto No. 3 in E♭, Op. 75. In 1897, Sergei Taneyev used the remaining movements as source for the Andante and Finale for piano and orchestra, which was published as Tchaikovsky's Op. posth. 79.

Between 1951 and 1955, Bogatyrev reconstructed the original Symphony in E♭ as he believed Tchaikovsky might have done had he not become disillusioned with it, and published it as the "Symphony No. 7 in E♭". It was first performed in Moscow in 1957.

He also wrote a number of his own compositions.
