= Symphony No. 6 (Tchaikovsky) =

1893 symphony by Pyotr Ilyich Tchaikovsky

- Pathétique
- by Pyotr Ilyich Tchaikovsky
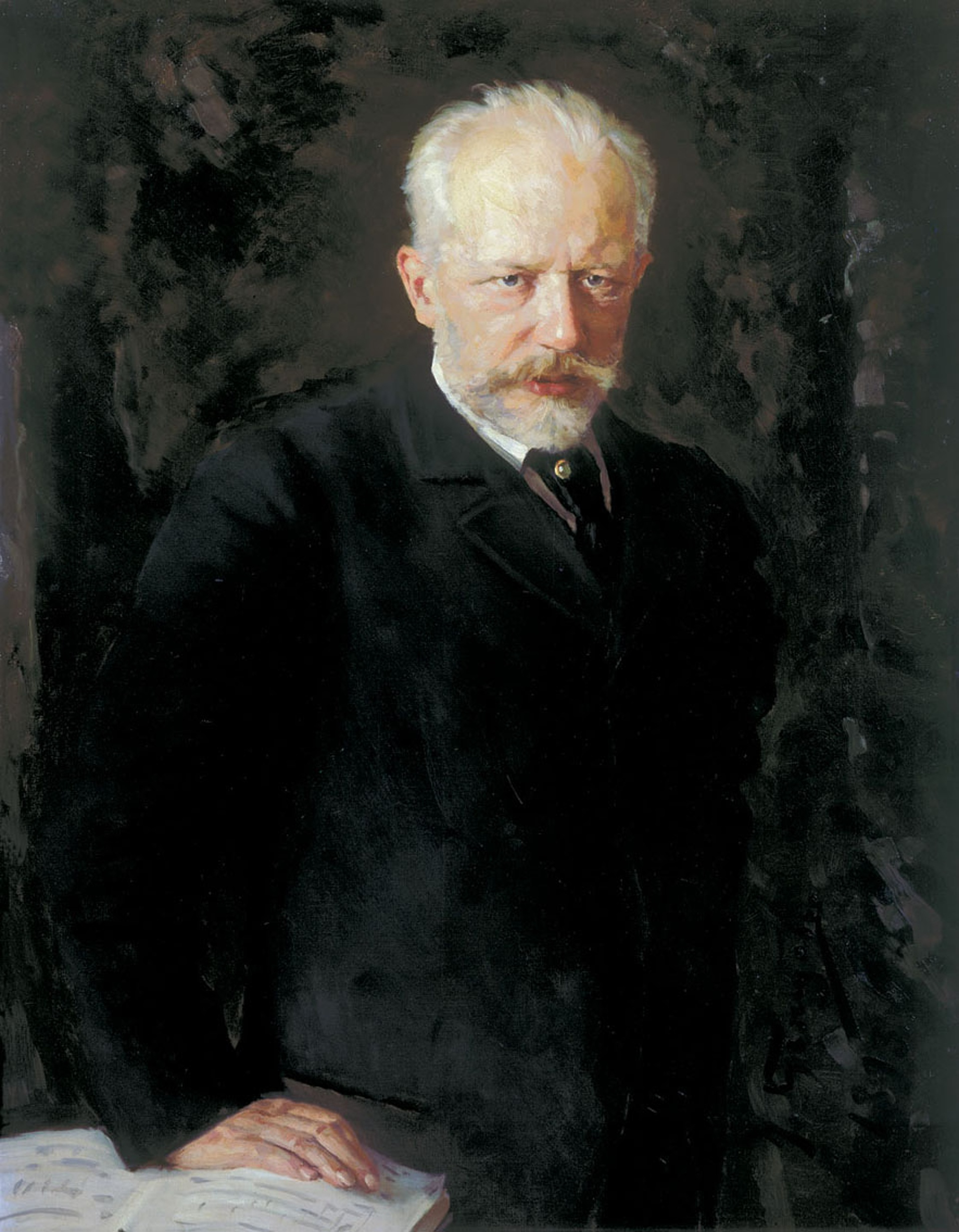
- Portrait of Tchaikovsky, 1893
- Key: B minor
- Opus: 74
- Composed: August 1893
- Dedication: Tchaikovsky's nephew, Vladimir Davydov
- Duration: about 45 minutes
- Movements: Four
- Scoring: Orchestra

Premiere
- Date: 28 October [O.S. 16 October] 1893
- Location: Saint Petersburg
- Conductor: Pyotr Ilyich Tchaikovsky

The Symphony No. 6 in B minor, Op. 74, also known as the Pathétique Symphony, is Pyotr Ilyich Tchaikovsky's final completed symphony, written between February and August 1893. The composer titled it "The Passionate Symphony", employing a Russian word, Патетическая (Pateticheskaya), meaning "passionate" or "emotional", which was then translated into French as pathétique, meaning "solemn" or "emotive".

Tchaikovsky led the first performance in Saint Petersburg on 28 October [O.S. 16 October] 1893, nine days before his death. The second performance, conducted by Eduard Nápravník, took place 21 days later, at a memorial concert on 18 November [O.S. 6 November]. It included some minor corrections that Tchaikovsky made after the premiere, and was thus the first performance of the work in the exact form in which it is known today. The first performance in Moscow was on 16 December [O.S. 4 December], conducted by Vasily Safonov. It was the last of Tchaikovsky's compositions premiered in his lifetime; his very last composition, the single-movement Third Piano Concerto, Op. 75, which was completed shortly before his death, received a posthumous premiere.

== Title ==
The Russian title of the symphony, Патетическая (Pateticheskaya), means "passionate" or "emotional", not "arousing pity", but it is a word reflective of a touch of concurrent suffering. Tchaikovsky considered calling it Программная (Programmnaya or "Program Symphony") but realized that would encourage curiosity about the program, which he did not want to reveal.

His brother Modest claims to have suggested the Патетическая title, which was used in early editions of the symphony; there are conflicting accounts about whether Tchaikovsky liked the title, but in any event his publisher chose to keep it. Its French translation Pathétique is generally used in French, Spanish, English, German and other languages. Many English-speaking classical musicians had, by the early 20th century, adopted an English spelling and pronunciation for Tchaikovsky's symphony, dubbing it "The Pathetic", to differentiate it from Beethoven's 1798 piano sonata also known as The Pathétique. Tchaikovsky's symphony was published in piano reduction by Jurgenson of Moscow in 1893 and by Robert Forberg of Leipzig in 1894.

== Background ==
After completing his 5th Symphony in 1888, Tchaikovsky did not start thinking about his next symphony until April 1891, when he began the first drafts on his way to the United States. But some or all of these drafts displeased him, and he tore up the manuscript "in one of his frequent moods of depression and doubt over his alleged inability to create". In 1892, Tchaikovsky wrote to his nephew Vladimir "Bob" Davydov:

The symphony is only a work written by dint of sheer will on the part of the composer; it contains nothing that is interesting or sympathetic. It should be cast aside and forgotten. This determination on my part is admirable and irrevocable.

This work was the Symphony in E♭, the first movement of which Tchaikovsky later converted into the Third Piano Concerto, and the latter two movements of which Sergei Taneyev reworked after Tchaikovsky's death as the Andante and Finale.

In February 1893, Tchaikovsky mentions an entirely new symphonic work in a letter to Davydov:

Now, on my journey, the idea of a new symphony came to me, this time one with a program, but a program that will be a riddle to everyone. Let them try and solve it ... The program of this symphony is completely saturated with myself and quite often during my journey I cried profusely. Having returned, I have settled down to write the sketches and the work is going so intensely, so fast, that the first movement was ready in less than four days, and the others have taken shape in my head. Half of the third movement is also done. There will still be much that is new in the form of this work and the finale is not to be a loud allegro but the slowest adagio.

And to his brother:

I am now wholly occupied with the new work ... and it is hard for me to tear myself away from it. I believe it comes into being as the best of my works. I must finish it as soon as possible, for I have to wind up a lot of affairs and I must soon go to London. I told you that I had completed a Symphony which suddenly displeased me, and I tore it up. Now I have composed a new symphony which I certainly shall not tear up.

The symphony was written in a small house in Klin and completed by August 1893. Tchaikovsky left Klin on 19 October for the first performance in Saint Petersburg, arriving "in excellent spirits". But he began to feel apprehension over the piece when, at rehearsals, the players did not exhibit any great admiration for it. Nevertheless, the premiere was met with great appreciation. Tchaikovsky's brother Modest wrote, "There was applause and the composer was recalled, but with more enthusiasm than on previous occasions. There was not the mighty, overpowering impression made by the work when it was conducted by Eduard Nápravník, on November 18, 1893, and later, wherever it was played."

== Instrumentation ==
The symphony is scored for an orchestra with the following instruments:

Replacement of a bassoon with a bass clarinet
From the anacrusis of bar 154
to bar 160 of the first movement

In the bar 160 above, the last four notes of the bassoon (shown in blue) are often played by a bass clarinet.

Woodwinds
3 flutes (3rd doubling piccolo)
2 oboes
2 clarinets (in A)
2 bassoons
Brass
4 horns
2 trumpets
3 trombones
1 tuba
Percussion
timpani
bass drum
cymbals
tam-tam (ad libitum)
Strings
violins I, II
violas
cellos
double basses

Although not called for in the score, a bass clarinet is commonly employed to replace the solo bassoon for the four notes immediately preceding the first movement's Allegro vivo, which originates from Austro-Hungarian conductor Hans Richter. This substitution is because it is nearly impossible in practice for a bassoonist to execute the passage at the indicated dynamic of pppppp.

== Music ==
The symphony is in four movements:

I. Adagio – Allegro non troppo

II. Allegro con grazia

III. Allegro molto vivace

IV. Adagio lamentoso
Performed by the Berlin Philharmonic under Wilhelm Furtwängler, 1938.

1. Adagio – Allegro non troppo (E minor – B minor – D major – D minor – C-sharp major – B minor – B major)
2. Allegro con grazia (D major – B minor – D major)
3. Allegro molto vivace (G major – E major – G major – D major – G major)
4. Adagio lamentoso (B minor – D major – C major – B minor)

=== I. Adagio – Allegro non troppo ===
The first movement, in sonata form, frequently alternates speeds, moods, and keys, with the main key being B minor. The introduction is formed from repeated modules of its initial theme, presented by the bassoon, whose purpose seems to be to open a dominant chord, failing to do so. Violas appear with the 12-bar first theme of the Allegro in B minor, a faster variant of the slow opening melody. The long, extended transitional section introduces the motif of the full, octave-long downward scale, which recurs throughout the symphony; it eventually leads to a long medial caesura that gives way to the secondary theme in D major. The exposition ends with a closing section over a tonic bass pedal.

The energetic development section begins abruptly with an outburst from the full orchestra, with half-diminished harmony that leads uneasily to D minor. It runs seamlessly into the fortissimo 4-bar statement of the first theme in the recapitulation, a great contrast in atmosphere from its hesitant equivalent at the beginning of the Allegro. In the transitional section, Tchaikovsky soon goes into something more nightmarish, which culminates in an explosion of despair and misery in B minor (foreshadowing the final movement), accompanied by a strong and repetitive four-note figure in the brass. This explosion concludes in a powerful note in the trombones marked quadruple forte, a rare, extreme dynamic marking. This section ends with diminishing strains on the basses and brass, letting through the pathos and upcoming despair of the symphony. The movement concludes shortly after the recapitulation of the second subject and the closing section, this time in the tonic major (B major), with a coda which is also in B major, finally ending very quietly.

=== II. Allegro con grazia ===
The second movement, a D major dance in ternary form, is in 5/4 time; it has been described as a "limping" waltz. The opening whirl, first presented as a cello section solo, contrasts with a darker section in B minor. There is upward momentum to the major sections, a suggestion of reconciliatory inversion of the downward scale motif. A fragmented coda crosses the scales and becomes more wistful before leading to a calm, rippling close.

=== III. Allegro molto vivace ===
The third movement starts with a scherzo, a playful, march-like weaving of 12/8 and 4/4 in a sonatina form. The strings establish a fast, light compound meter which later lies underneath more brusque wind fanfares in 4/4. This leads to the jubilant E major secondary theme in full, first given quietly by unison clarinets with a continued string accompaniment. Between the exposition and the recapitulation, there is no development section, only two bars of fragmentary retransition. The opening theme reappears emboldened, and after flourishes of scales traded between the strings and woodwind, the secondary theme returns triumphantly in G major; this is the only appearance of the bass drum and cymbals. The movement ends with a deceptive finale, once again featuring downward scales. It is probably no coincidence that the movement, with its stormy character through restless strings, wind-like whistling woodwinds and thundering brass instruments, is reminiscent of the finale of Joachim Raff's Symphony No. 3 "In the forest": the symphony was one of the most played of its time, and Raff had already inspired the horn solo in his Fifth Symphony.

=== IV. Adagio lamentoso ===
Back in B minor, although opening with a striking half-diminished chord, the fourth movement has a six-part sonata rondo form (A-B-A-C-A-B). The opening theme in the violins appears frequently, varying in intensity. The theme is a "composite melody": at first, neither the first nor second violins play in full the upper line that is heard.

A calmer B theme in D major builds up to a full orchestral palette, with driving brass and descending scales pushing to a Neapolitan C major caesura. The B theme is transformed in a dramatic return to B minor before the A theme returns. As in the first movement, there is a turbulent climax with prominent trombones in the development section (the C theme), followed by the most agitated restatement of the A theme (the start of the recapitulation), on an F♯ bass pedal. The music fades into a single, unique strike of a tam-tam; this quietly introduces a funereal chorale in the low brass that rounds off the dominant harmony. The return of the B section is richly mournful, coinciding with the final resolution to B minor. The waves of descending muted string motifs carry into the lower strings and bassoons, finally dying away.

Of Tchaikovsky's symphonies, only this one ends in a minor key. His First, Second, Fourth, and Fifth, and the Manfred Symphony, are all minor-key symphonies that end in the tonic major, while his Third is D major and his unfinished Symphony in E♭ (unofficially "No. 7") is E♭ major.

It is also unusual for a slow movement to end a symphony. The despondent effect of the structural upheaval here has been the subject of much critical analysis. Had Tchaikovsky followed the standard four-movement structure, the movements would have been ordered like this:

1. Adagio – Allegro non troppo
2. Adagio lamentoso (actually IV)
3. Allegro con grazia (actually II)
4. Finale: Allegro molto vivace (actually III)

== Interpretation ==
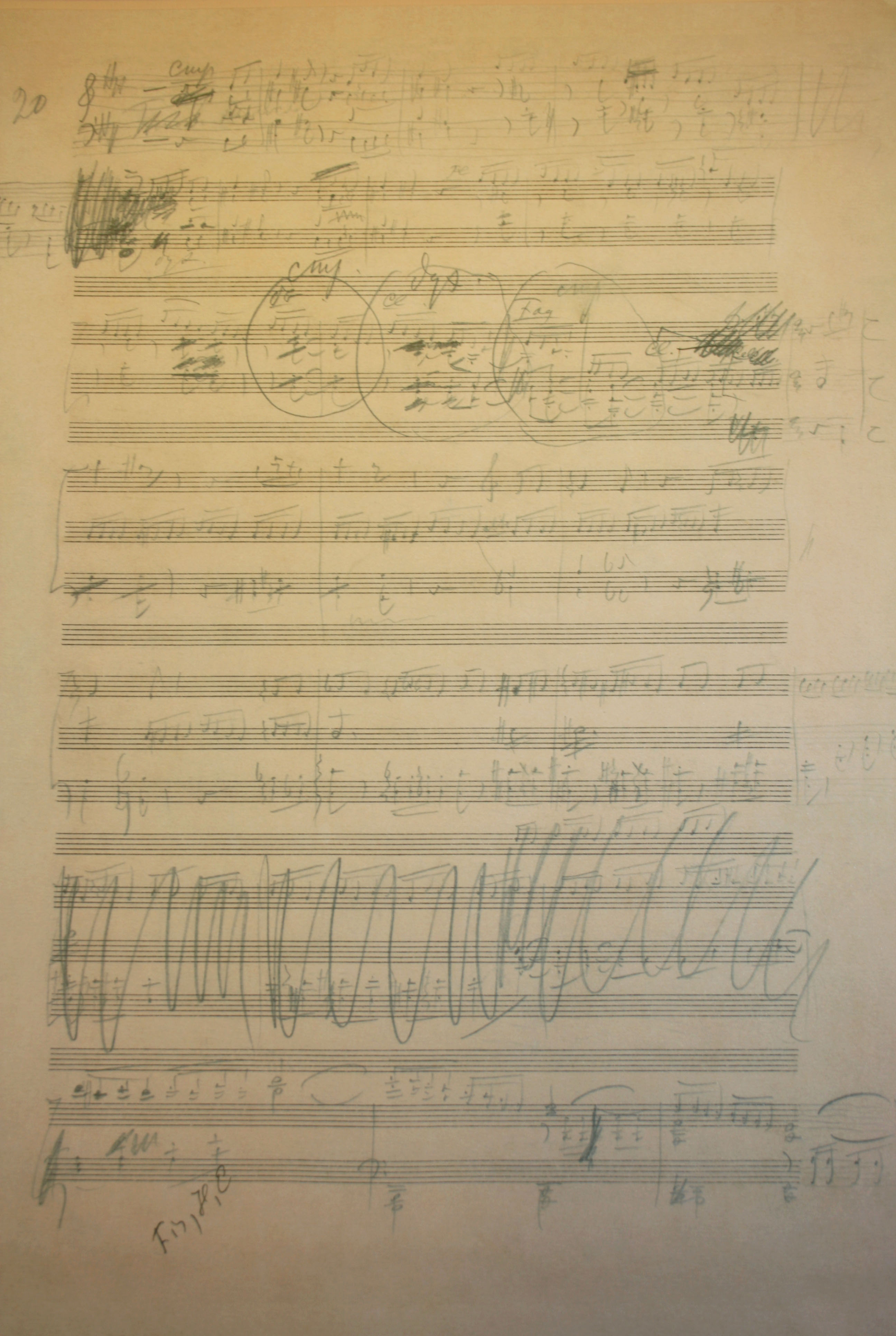
Tchaikovsky's draft of the Sixth Symphony

Tchaikovsky critic Richard Taruskin writes:

Suicide theories were much stimulated by the Sixth Symphony, which was first performed under the composer's baton only nine days before his demise, with its lugubrious finale (ending morendo, 'dying away'), its brief but conspicuous allusion to the Orthodox requiem liturgy in the first movement and above all its easily misread subtitle. ... When the symphony was done again a couple of weeks later, in memoriam and with subtitle in place, everyone listened hard for portents, and that is how the symphony became a transparent suicide note. Depression was the first diagnosis. "Homosexual tragedy" came later.

The critic Alexander Poznansky wrote, "Since the arrival of the 'court of honour' theory in the West, performances of Tchaikovsky's last symphony are almost invariably accompanied by annotations treating it as a testimony of homosexual martyrdom." But critic David Brown calls the idea of the Sixth Symphony as a suicide note "patent nonsense". Other scholars, including Michael Paul Smith, believe that with or without the supposed "court of honour" sentence, Tchaikovsky could not have known the time of his death while writing the piece. There is also evidence that Tchaikovsky was unlikely to have been depressed while writing it, with his brother noting of him after he had sent the manuscript for publishing, "I had not seen him so bright for a long time past."

=== Dedication and suggested programs ===
Tchaikovsky dedicated the Pathétique to his nephew, Vladimir "Bob" Davydov, whom he greatly admired.

The Pathétique has been the subject of a number of theories as to a hidden program. This goes back to the first performance of the work, when Nikolai Rimsky-Korsakov asked Tchaikovsky whether it had a program and Tchaikovsky said it did but would not divulge it.

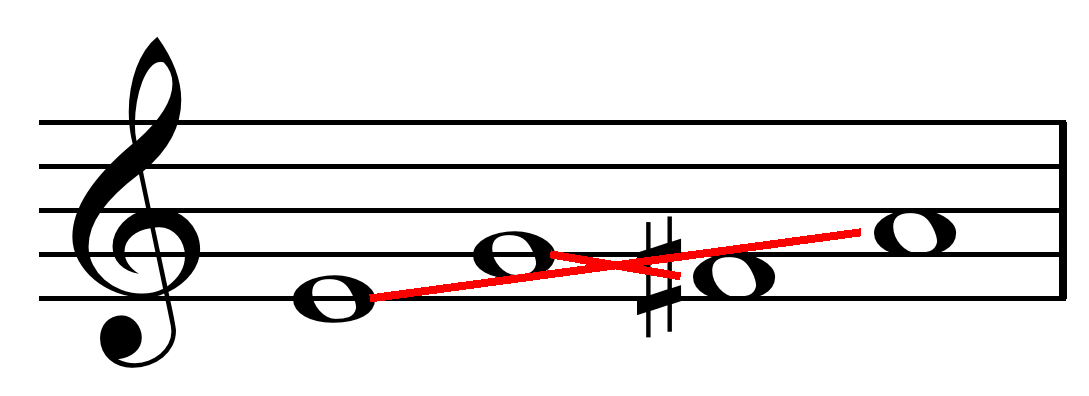
Tchaikovsky's "Cross"-motif, associated with the crucifixion, himself, and Tristan, a variation of which first appears in mm. 1–2 of his Pathétique Symphony. Tchaikovsky identified with and associated the cross-motif with "star-cross'd lovers" in general, such as in Romeo and Juliet.

A suggested program has been what Taruskin disparagingly termed "symphony as suicide note". This idea began to assert itself as early as the piece's second performance, not long after the composer died. People at that performance "listened hard for portents. As always, they found what they were looking for: a brief but conspicuous quotation from the Russian Orthodox requiem at the stormy climax of the first movement, and of course the unconventional Adagio finale with its tense harmonies at the onset and its touching depiction of the dying of the light in conclusion". Countering this is Tchaikovsky's statement on 26 September/8 October 1893 that he was in no mood to write any sort of requiem. This was in reply to a suggestion from his friend Grand Duke Konstantin that he write a requiem for their mutual friend the writer Aleksey Apukhtin, who had died in late August, just as Tchaikovsky was completing the Pathétique.

Tchaikovsky specialist David Brown suggests that the symphony deals with the power of fate in life and death. This program would not only be similar to those suggested for the Fourth and Fifth Symphonies but also parallels a program Tchaikovsky suggested for his unfinished Symphony in E♭. That program reads, "The ultimate essence ... of the symphony is Life. First part—all impulse, passion, confidence, thirst for activity. Must be short (the finale death—result of collapse). Second part love: third disappointments; fourth ends dying away (also short)."

Simon Karlinsky, a composer and professor of Slavic languages and literature at UC Berkeley and "expert on homosexuality in pre-Soviet culture", wrote in the gay literary magazine Christopher Street in 1988 that in 1941 a musician friend of his youth named Alex, who had spent several months associating with the painter Pavel Tchelitchew, told him something Tchelitchew had heard from Tchaikovsky's brother Modest, told to him by Tchaikovsky himself. According to this "poorly remembered hearsay" (Karlinsky's words), the symphony's secret program is about love between men: the search for it, from the beginning of the first movement; finding it, in the romantic andante theme (measure 89); the attacks of a hostile world on it, in the agitated allegro vivo passage that follows (measure 161); and escape from that, in the return to the love theme (andante come prima, measure 305). The last movement, Karlinsky was told, is an elegy for a dead lover.

== In literature ==
The symphony plays a major role in E. M. Forster's novel Maurice (written in 1913 and later, but unpublished until 1971), where it serves as a veiled reference to homosexuality.

== Notes ==
=== Sources ===
- Bagar, Robert (1947). "Peter Ilyitch Tchaikowsky". The Concert Companion: A Comprehensive Guide to Symphonic Music. New York: McGraw-Hill.
- Brown, David (1992). Tchaikovsky: The Final Years. New York: W. W. Norton. ISBN 0-393-03099-7.
- Del Mar, Norman (1983). Anatomy of the Orchestra. University of California Press. p. 180. ISBN 978-0520050624.
- Fifield, Christopher (2016). Hans Richter. Boydell & Brewer. ISBN 978-1783270217.
- Jackson, Timothy L. (1999). Tchaikovsky: Symphony No. 6 (Pathétique). Cambridge Music Handbooks. Cambridge University Press. ISBN 0-521-64676-6.
- Poznansky, Alexander (1991). Tchaikovsky: The Quest for the Inner Man. Schirmer Books. ISBN 978-0028718866. 1993 British edition at the Internet Archive
- Rimsky-Korsakov, Nikolai (1942). My Musical Life (3rd ed.). New York: Knopf.
- Steinberg, Michael (1995). The Symphony. Oxford and New York: Oxford University Press. ISBN 0-19-512665-3.|
- Taruskin, Richard (2009). On Russian Music. Berkeley and Los Angeles: University of California Press. ISBN 9780520268067.
