= Andante and Finale =

Sketch of Tchaikovsky in 1893

The Andante and Finale is a composition for piano and orchestra that was reworked by Sergei Taneyev from sketches by Pyotr Ilyich Tchaikovsky for the abandoned latter movements of his single-movement Piano Concerto No. 3, Op. 75.

The core of the music is by Tchaikovsky, but the realisation was by Taneyev, and the decisions on the form, genre and title were jointly made by Taneyev, Tchaikovsky's brother Modest, Alexander Siloti and the publisher Mitrofan Belyayev. It was nevertheless published in 1897 as a work of Tchaikovsky's alone, and even given the posthumous opus number 79 in Tchaikovsky's catalogue.

The Third Piano Concerto and the Andante and Finale are sometimes played together to form a synthetic "complete" concerto.

== Background ==
What is known as the Andante and Finale had its genesis as the slow movement and finale of Tchaikovsky's Symphony in E♭, a work he started writing in 1892. He abandoned the symphony in December 1892, but after his nephew Bob Davydov chided him, he began reworking it into a piano concerto, his third, which he promised to the French pianist Louis Diémer. The composer finished the outline of the first movement (Allegro brillante) of this concerto in July 1893, then put it aside to continue work on his 6th Symphony (Pathétique). He completed the symphony in August, then returned to the concerto, which he had by this time decided to publish as a single-movement Allegro de concert.

The remaining movements were left in sketch form, and abandoned. Tchaikovsky had written "End of movement 1" on the last page of the Allegro de concert. However, when he decided to publish only that movement as a complete work, he omitted to cross this out. This has caused some speculation about his true intentions, for example, whether he might have eventually expanded the concerto to a full three-movement work, or used the other movements in some other form, had he not died. However, there is strong evidence that he had no further use for them. As late as 6 October 1893, a month before his death, he wrote to the Polish pianist and composer Zygmunt Stojowski: "As I wrote to you, my new Symphony is finished. I am now working on the scoring of my new (third) concerto for our dear Diémer. When you see him, please tell him that when I proceeded to work on it, I realized that this concerto is of depressing and threatening length. Consequently I decided to leave only part one which in itself will constitute an entire concerto. The work will only improve the more since the last two parts were not worth very much."

The 6th Symphony was the last of his compositions to be performed in his lifetime, but the Allegro de concert was Tchaikovsky's last completed composition. It was posthumously published by P. Jurgenson as the Piano Concerto No. 3, Op. 75.

After his brother's death, Modest Tchaikovsky asked the composer's friend and former student Sergei Taneyev to go through the sketches of his compositions that had been left unfinished. In November 1894, Taneyev began to study the unfinished sketches of these two movements. Both Taneyev and Modest questioned how the work should be published—as two orchestral movements for a symphony or to preserve its subsequent arrangement and complete reworking them as a piece for piano and orchestra. After a letter from pianist Alexander Siloti to Modest in April 1895, he and Taneyev took the piano-and-orchestra route.

Another question was where and how these two movements would be published. This was complicated by the fact that P. Jurgenson had already published the single-movement concerto as a complete work, in accordance with Tchaikovsky's wishes. Modest and Taneyev eventually offered the Andante and Finale to M. P. Belyayev, together with the overtures Fatum and The Storm, and the symphonic ballad The Voyevoda.

Belyayev questioned how to publish the Andante and Finale—as a fourth concerto in two movements, as two concert pieces, or in purely orchestral form as two movements from an unfinished symphony. He eventually published the Andante and Finale in 1897 in Taneyev's version for piano and orchestra, and gave it the opus number 79, as if it were a composition by Tchaikovsky, which is only partly true.

The first performance of Andante and Finale took place on February 8, 1897, in St. Petersburg with Taneyev as soloist.

== Music ==
There are two movements:

1. Andante, B♭ major
2. Finale. Allegro maestoso, E♭ major

The first movement is a simple song-like movement. It contains a central dialogue between cello solo and piano which, according to writer Eric Blom, "enhance[s] the effect of a tune at the very moment when its repetition might possibly become tiresome—in this case at the return of the main theme."

This quasi-martial 'allegro maestoso' has energy in abundance—indeed, over-abundance, Blom writes—"but no real vitality of invention. The material is dry and dead, nor does the extremely busy and strenuously athletic piano part give any real life to it. There is plenty of bustle and very little enterprise."

Consistent with Tchaikovsky's practice in his first two concertos, Taneyev reduces the orchestra to woodwinds, horns, and strings for the Andante. He scored the finale for full orchestra, again as per Tchaikovsky's practice.

== Synthetic completion of the Third Concerto ==
The single-movement Third Piano Concerto and the Andante and Finale are sometimes played together to form a synthetic "complete" three-movement concerto, but this is without any authority from the composer. Whether Tchaikovsky would have fulfilled his original conception of a standard three-movement concerto, and if so, whether he would have used the Andante and Finale music or written new music, is purely conjecture. John Warrack writes: "[W]hat survives is a reconstruction in concerto form of some music Tchaikovsky was planning, not a genuine Tchaikovsky piano concerto." Eric Blom adds, "It is true that even Taneyev did not know for certain whether Tchaikovsky, if he actually meant to turn out a three-movement concerto, would not have preferred to scrap the Andante and Finale altogether and to replace them by two entirely new movements; so if we decide that the finale at any rate is a poor piece of work, we must blame Taneyev for preserving it rather than Tchaikovsky for having conceived it. For we cannot even be sure how far the conception may have been carried out ..."

Warrack concludes, "The kindest response is to remember that Tchaikovsky himself abandoned it. Taneyev was being over-pious: much the best solution of the problem of what to do with the music is to perform the Third Concerto as Tchaikovsky left it, in one movement; it could with advantage be heard sometimes in concerts at which soloists wish to add something less than another full-scale concerto to the main work in their program."
