= Alexander Poznansky =

American historian

Alexander Poznansky (born 1950) is a Russian-American scholar of the life and works of Pyotr Ilyich Tchaikovsky.

Poznansky was born in 1950 at Vyborg. In 1968, he relocated to Leningrad.

Poznansky emigrated from the Soviet Union to the United States in 1977, where he is a Slavic & East European Languages librarian at Yale University. He is perhaps best known for his 1991 book: Tchaikovsky: The Quest for the Inner Man, published by Schirmer/Macmillan.

== Books ==
- Tchaikovsky: The Quest for the Inner Man. New York: Schirmer Books. 1991. ISBN 978-0-02-871886-6.
- Tchaikovsky's Last Days: A Documentary Study. Oxford: Clarendon Press. 1996. ISBN 978-0-19-816596-5.
- Tchaikovsky Through Others' Eyes. Bloomington, IN: Indiana University Press. 1999. ISBN 978-0-253-33545-6.
- The Tchaikovsky Handbook: A Guide to the Man and His Music: Catalogue of Letters, Genealogy, Bibliography. Indiana University Press. 2002. ISBN 978-0-253-33921-8.
