= Cello Concerto in E major (Cassadó-Tchaikovsky) =

The Cello Concerto in E major was created by the cellist Gaspar Cassadó, who took nine of Pyotr Ilyich Tchaikovsky's pieces from his Piano Pieces, Op. 72, and orchestrated them as, collectively, a concerto.

The pieces Cassadó used were: Scene dansante (Invitation au trepak), Tendres Reproches, and Chant Elegiaque in the first movement; Meditation and Dialogue in the second; and Danse Characteristique, Berceuse, Passe Lointain, and Impromptu in the third.

This concerto was a favorite of Cassadó's, but he never recorded it. No other recording of the work exists.
