= The Storm (Tchaikovsky) =

1864 overture by Pyotr Ilyich Tchaikovsky

- by Pyotr Ilyich Tchaikovsky
- Tchaikovsky around the time of composition.
- Key: E minor
- Composed: 1864

The Storm, Op. 76 (TH 36) (Russian: Гроза, groza), is an overture (in the context of a symphonic poem) in E minor composed by Pyotr Ilyich Tchaikovsky around June and August 1864. The work is inspired by the play The Storm by the Russian playwright Alexander Ostrovsky. The same play also inspired Leoš Janáček's opera Káťa Kabanová.

== History ==
The Storm was Tchaikovsky's first substantial work for orchestra, written when he was only 24. He was spending the summer at the family estate of Prince Aleksey Vasilievich Golitsyn at Trostyanets, near Kharkiv in Ukraine, and wrote the overture as a vacation exercise. He did not consider it worthy of publication, and it was never performed in his lifetime. This opinion may have been influenced by Anton Rubinstein, who disapproved of it, and by Herman Laroche, who said it represented "a museum of antimusical curiosities".

In the summer of 1865–66, Tchaikovsky reworked the opening of the piece as the Concert Overture in C minor. This was also not performed or published in Tchaikovsky's lifetime.

The Storm was first performed, posthumously, in Saint Petersburg on March 7, 1896, conducted by Alexander Glazunov. It was published by Mitrofan Belyayev, as Op. 76.

The "Poco Meno Mosso" section of the piece is also used as the main theme for the second movement of his Symphony No. 1 in G Minor "Winter Dreams".

The Concert Overture in C minor did not have its first performance until 1931, in Voronezh, under the baton of Konstantin Saradzhev.
