= Vladimir Davydov =

Tchaikovsky's nephew (1871–1906)

Davydov (right) with Pyotr Ilyich Tchaikovsky, in 1892

Vladimir Lvovich Davydov (Russian: Владимир Львович Давыдов; December 14 [O.S. December 2] 1871 – December 27 [O.S. December 14] 1906) was the second son of Lev and Alexandra Davydov, and nephew of the composer Pyotr Ilyich Tchaikovsky, who called him "Bob".

== Life ==
From his earliest years, Davydov showed an aptitude for music and drawing, which was encouraged by his uncle. After he studied at the Imperial School of Jurisprudence in Saint Petersburg, however, Davydov decided on a military career and joined the Preobrazhensky Lifeguard regiment. He resigned his commission as a lieutenant in 1897 and moved to Klin, where he helped the composer's brother Modest create a museum to commemorate Tchaikovsky's life. Prone to depression, Davydov used morphine and other drugs before he died by suicide in 1906 at the age of 34. He is buried at the town's Dem'ianovo Cemetery.

== Relationship with Tchaikovsky ==
After Tchaikovsky lost the support of Nadezhda von Meck in 1890, he made Davydov his confidant. Tchaikovsky considered relocating from Klin to Saint Petersburg in the last few years of his life so as to live closer to Davydov (a potential move that caused fellow composer Nikolai Rimsky-Korsakov some distress) writing to his brother Modest, "Seeing the importance of Bob in my life is increasing all the time.... To see him, hear him and feel him close to me will soon become for me, it seems, the paramount condition for my happiness." Davydov was one of the party that remained with Tchaikovsky through his final illness, likely cholera. Tchaikovsky named Davydov in his will as the inheritor of the royalties and copyrights to his musical works.

== Dedications ==
Tchaikovsky dedicated his Children's Album of piano works, Op. 39 to Davydov, as well as his Sixth Symphony, Op. 74, the Pathétique.

== See also ==
- Tatiana Davydova
