= Louis Diémer =

French pianist and composer (1843–1919)

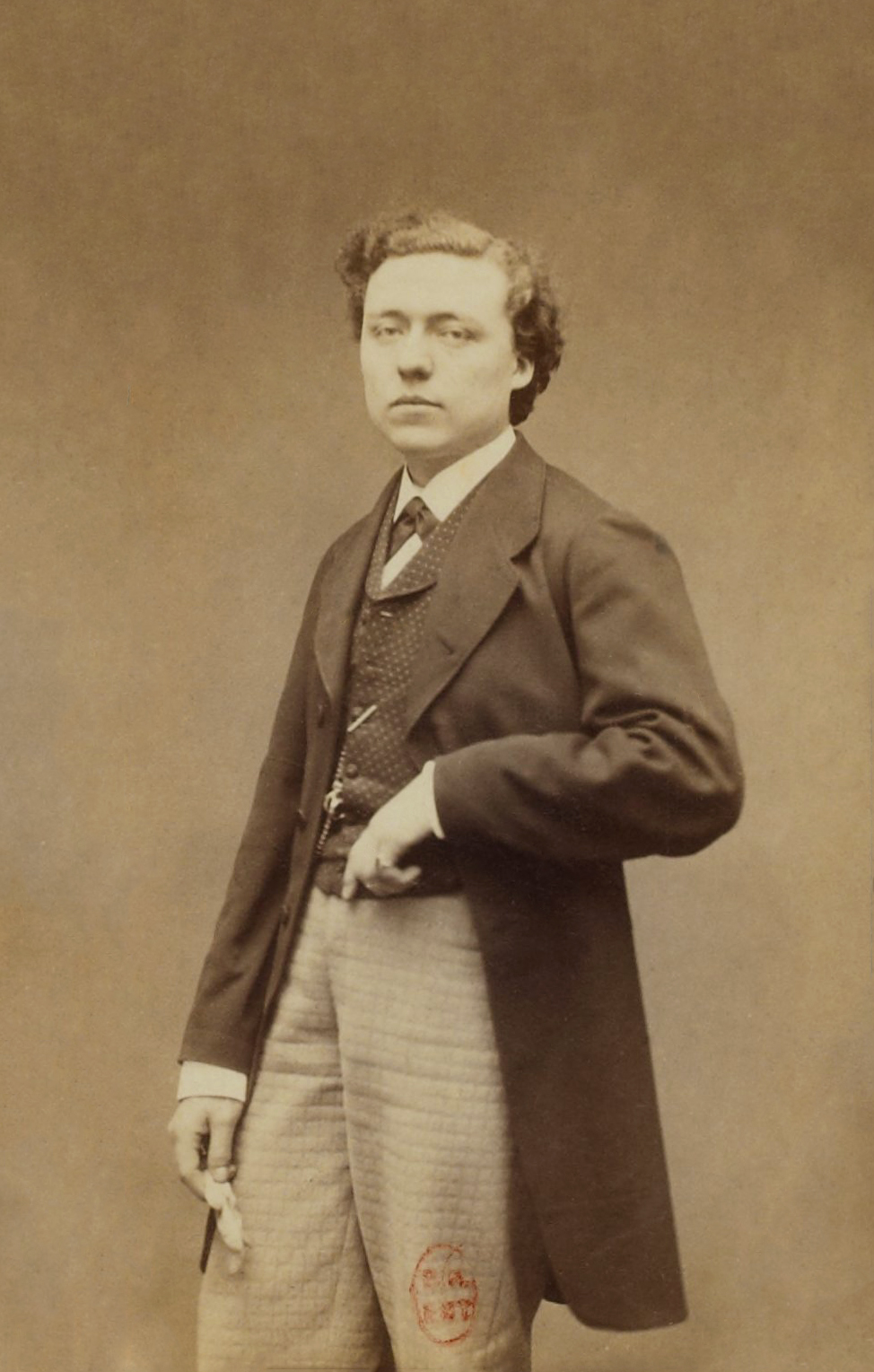
Diémer, c.1860s, by Étienne Carjat

Louis Joseph Diémer (14 February 1843 – 21 December 1919) was a French pianist and composer. He was the founder of the Société des Instruments Anciens in the 1890s, and also gave recitals on the harpsichord. His output as a composer was extensive, including a piano concerto and a quantity of salon pieces.

== Life ==
Diémer was born and died in Paris. He studied at the Paris Conservatoire, where his teachers included Ambroise Thomas for composition, Antoine Marmontel for piano, and François Benoist for organ. From the age of twelve, he won several first prizes (Premiers Prix) at the Conservatoire, in piano, harmony and accompaniment, counterpoint and fugue, and solfège, and a second prix in organ.

He quickly built a reputation as a virtuoso and toured with, among others, the violinists Delphin Alard and Pablo de Sarasate.

In 1888, Diémer succeeded Marmontel as professor of piano at the Paris Conservatory. He taught, among others, Robert Casadesus, Alfredo Casella, Marcel Ciampi, Alfred Cortot, José Cubiles, Lazare Lévy, Robert Lortat, Yves Nat, and Édouard Risler. He was also instrumental in promoting the use of historical instruments, giving a series of harpsichord performances as part of the 1889 Universal Exhibition and contributing to the founding of the Société des Instruments Anciens.

== Works dedicated to Diémer ==
Several composers dedicated compositions to Diémer. They included César Franck's Symphonic Variations, Jules Massenet's only piano concerto, Camille Saint-Saëns's 5th Piano Concerto, and Édouard Lalo's Piano Concerto in F minor. Pyotr Ilyich Tchaikovsky's 3rd Piano Concerto was intended to be dedicated to him.

== Recordings ==
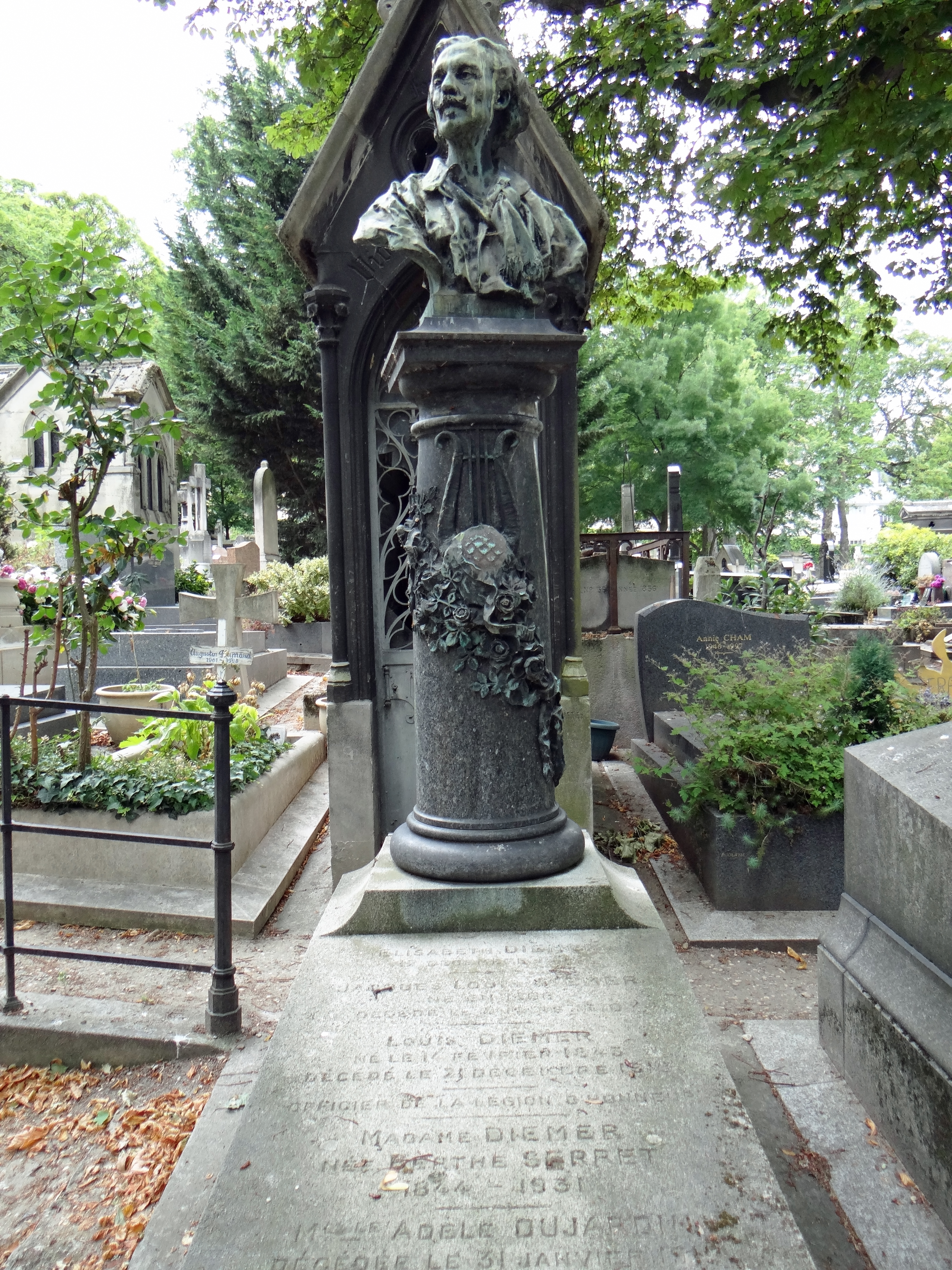
His grave in the Montmartre Cemetery.

Diémer was also among the earliest pianists to record for the gramophone. His recordings are said to show the best aspects of the 19th-century French piano school: clarity, point, and control in rapid, detaché passages and limpid pianissimo scales. They clearly attest to Diémer's title in the French press as "the king of the scale and the trill". They also give evidence to comments made by his pupil Lazare Lévy, who himself would become an influence on the French musical scene. Lévy wrote: "The astonishing precision of [Diémer's] playing, his legendary trills, the sobriety of his style, made him the excellent pianist we all admired".

== Bibliography ==
- Schonberg, Harold C. (1987) [1963], The Great Pianists (Rev Upd ed.), New York: Simon & Schuster, ISBN 978-0671638375
- Roger Cotte, Bernard Haultier: "Diémer, Louis (Joseph)", in: Die Musik in Geschichte und Gegenwart (MGG), biographical part, vol. 5 (Kassel: Bärenreiter, 2001), cc. 998–1000.
