= David Brown (musicologist) =

English musicologist (1929–2014)

David Clifford Brown (8 July 1929, in Gravesend – 20 June 2014) was an English musicologist, most noteworthy for his major study of Tchaikovsky’s life and works.

Brown attended Gravesend Grammar School and then studied English, Latin and music at the University of Sheffield, graduating in 1951, and took his MusB there (1952). During national service (1952-4) he studied Russian and was commissioned in the Intelligence Corps. He taught in secondary schools before becoming music librarian of the University of London, working at Senate House 1959–62. In 1962 he became a lecturer at the University of Southampton, becoming senior lecturer in 1970 and reader in 1975; he was awarded a doctorate for his book on Thomas Weelkes in 1971. His book on Mikhail Glinka (published 1974) was the first major study of the composer in English. This was surpassed by his four volume study of Tchaikovsky (published between 1978 and 1991), both a biography and in-depth analyses of Tchaikovsky’s works. He was also editor of the New Grove Russian Masters series, and served on the editorial committee of Musica Britannica, the national collection of British music. He retired as Professor of Musicology in 1989.

He died in Romsey, Hampshire aged 84 after suffering from Alzheimer's disease.

== Books ==
- Thomas Weelkes: a Biographical and Critical study (London: Faber & Faber, 1969)
- Mikhail Glinka: a Biographical and Critical Study (London: Oxford University Press, 1974)
- Brown, David (1974). Wilbye. Oxford: Oxford University Press. ISBN 978-0-19-315220-5.
- Tchaikovsky: A Biographical and Critical Study: Vol. 1: “The Early Years (1840–1874)” (London: Gollancz, 1978); Vol. 2: “The Crisis Years (1874–1878)” (London: Gollancz, 1982); Vol. 3: “The Years of Wandering (1878–1885)” (London: Gollancz, 1986); Vol. 4: “The Final Years (1885–1893)” (London: Gollancz, 1991); paperback edition (2 vols) includes minor corrections and updated Work List (London: Gollancz, 1992)
- The New Grove Russian Masters 1: Glinka, Borodin, Balakirev, Musorgsky, Tchaikovsky / David Brown, Gerald Abraham, David Lloyd-Jones, Edward Gordon (London: Palgrave Macmillan, 1986)
- Musorgsky: His Life and Works (London: Oxford University Press, 2002)
- Tchaikovsky: The Man and His Music (London: Faber & Faber, 2006)
