= Sergei Taneyev =

Russian composer and pianist (1856–1915)

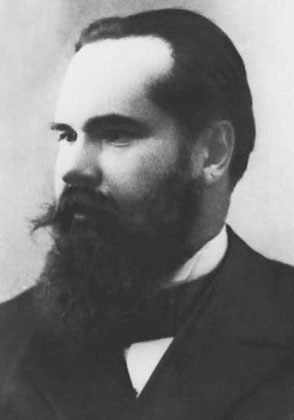
Sergey I. Taneyev

Sergei Ivanovich Taneyev (Note: Also seen as Taneev or Taneiev.) (Russian: Серге́й Ива́нович Тане́ев, pronounced [sʲɪrˈɡʲej ɪˈvanəvʲɪtɕ tɐˈnʲejɪf]; 25 November [O.S. 13 November] 1856 – 19 June [O.S. 6 June] 1915) was a Russian composer, pianist, teacher of composition, music theorist and author.

== Life ==
Taneyev was born in Vladimir, to a cultured and literary family of Russian nobility. A distant cousin, Alexander Taneyev, was also a composer, whose daughter, Anna Vyrubova, was highly influential at court. Alexander was drawn closely to the nationalist school of music exemplified by The Five, while Sergei would gravitate toward a more cosmopolitan outlook, as did Tchaikovsky.

He began taking piano lessons at the age of five with a private teacher. His family moved to Moscow in 1865. The following year, the nine-year-old Taneyev entered the Moscow Conservatory. His first piano teacher at the Conservatory was Edward Langer. After a year's interruption in his studies, Taneyev studied again with Langer. He also joined the theory class of Nikolai Hubert and, most importantly, the composition class of Pyotr Ilyich Tchaikovsky. In 1871, Taneyev studied piano with the Conservatory's founder, Nikolai Rubinstein.

Taneyev graduated in 1875, the first student in the history of the Conservatory to win the gold medal both for composition and for performing (piano). He was also the first person to be awarded the Conservatory's Great Gold Medal. That summer he travelled abroad with Rubinstein. That year he also made his debut as a concert pianist in Moscow playing Brahms's First Piano Concerto, and would become known for his interpretations of Bach, Mozart and Beethoven. In March 1876 he toured Russia with violinist Leopold Auer.

Taneyev was also the soloist at the Moscow première of Tchaikovsky's First Piano Concerto in December 1875. He was chosen after Gustav Kross had given a dreadful performance at the concerto's Russian première in St Petersburg three weeks earlier. The conductor on the later occasion was Nikolai Rubinstein, who had famously lambasted the work less than a year earlier (5 January), but who had by that time come to appreciate its merits. Tchaikovsky was clearly impressed by Taneyev's performance; he later asked Taneyev to be soloist in the Russian première of his Second Piano Concerto and of his Piano Trio in A minor. After Tchaikovsky's death, Taneyev edited sketches by Tchaikovsky that he completed with an Andante and Finale and were premièred as a Tchaikovsky Third Piano Concerto.

Taneyev attended Moscow University for a short time and was acquainted with outstanding Russian writers, including Ivan Turgenev and Mikhail Saltykov-Shchedrin. During his travels in Western Europe in 1876 and 1877, he met Émile Zola, Gustave Flaubert, César Franck, and Camille Saint-Saëns, amongst others.

When Tchaikovsky resigned from the Moscow Conservatory in 1878, Taneyev was appointed to teach harmony. He would later also teach piano and composition. He served as Director from 1885 to 1889, and continued teaching until 1905. He had great influence as a teacher of composition. His pupils included Alexander Scriabin, Sergei Rachmaninoff, Jacob Weinberg, Reinhold Glière, Paul Juon, Julius Conus, Nikolai Medtner, and Thomas de Hartmann. The polyphonic interweaves in the music of Rachmaninoff and Medtner stem directly from Taneyev's teaching. Scriabin, on the other hand, broke away from Taneyev's influence.

Taneyev was also a scholar of notable erudition. In addition to music, he studied—for relaxation—natural and social science, history, mathematics, plus the philosophies of Plato and Spinoza.

During the summers of 1895 and 1896, Taneyev stayed at Yasnaya Polyana, the home of Leo Tolstoy and his wife Sofia. The latter developed an attachment to the composer that embarrassed her children and made Tolstoy jealous, although Taneyev himself remained unaware of it.

In 1905, revolution and its consequent effect on the Moscow Conservatory led Taneyev to resign from the staff there. He resumed his career as a concert pianist, both as soloist and chamber musician. He was also able to pursue composition more intensely, completing chamber works with a piano part which he could play in concerts as well as some choruses and a substantial number of songs. His last completed work was the cantata At the Reading of a Psalm, completed at the beginning of 1915.

Taneyev contracted pneumonia after attending the funeral of Scriabin, in Moscow, on 16 April 1915. While he was recovering, he succumbed to a heart attack in Dyudkovo, near Zvenigorod.

A museum dedicated to Taneyev is located in Dyudkovo. There is also a section dedicated to Taneyev at the Tchaikovsky Museum in Klin.

== Taneyev and Tchaikovsky ==
Taneyev became the most trusted musician among Tchaikovsky's friends. The two developed a romantic relationship that would last until Tchaikovsky's death. The symphonic poem Francesca da Rimini, Op. 32, is dedicated to Taneyev.

Taneyev was a fastidious and diligent craftsman with an unrivaled technique. Tchaikovsky realized that the opinions of such a man, whose own taste and competence were so high, yet whose self-scrutiny was so exacting, were to be respected, and in consequence came greatly to appreciate criticism from Taneyev. In fact, Taneyev became the only one of Tchaikovsky's friends encouraged by the composer to be absolutely frank about his works.

Taneyev's frankness came at a price, however, and that price for Tchaikovsky was forbearance in the face of a forthrightness that frequently reached the point of absolute bluntness. This meant that, while Tchaikovsky appreciated Taneyev's views and welcomed them, he did not always like them. The postscript to a letter Tchaikovsky wrote to Taneyev about Eugene Onegin and the Fourth Symphony sums up his general frame of mind: "I know you are absolutely sincere and I think a great deal of your judgment. But I also fear it."

Tchaikovsky's use of the word "fear" was not exaggerated. The music writer and composer Leonid Sabaneyev studied composition with Taneyev as a child and met Tchaikovsky through him. To Sabaneyev, Tchaikovsky really did seem afraid of Taneyev in some ways. He also suggests why:

I think he was unnerved by the overt frankness with which Taneyev reacted to Tchaikovsky's works: Taneyev believed that one must indicate precisely what one finds to be 'faults,' while strong points would make themselves evident. He was hardly fully justified in his conviction: composers are a nervous lot and they are often particularly dissatisfied with themselves. Tchaikovsky was just such a person: he worried himself almost sick over each work and often tried even to destroy them...

Sabaneyev recalled Tchaikovsky's coming to Taneyev with his Fifth Symphony. Taneyev started playing through part of the manuscript at the piano. "With characteristic pedantry Taneyev began showing Tchaikovsky what he considered to be faults, thereby sending Tchaikovsky into even greater despair. Tchaikovsky grabbed the music and wrote across the page with a red pencil: "Awful muck." Still not satisfied with this punishment, he tore the sheet of music in half and threw it on the floor. Then he ran out of the room. Despondently Taneyev picked up the music and told me: "Pyotr Ilyich takes everything to heart. After all, he himself asked me to give my opinion..."

Despite Tchaikovsky's notoriously thin skin when it came to criticism, he could not take any lasting offense at such transparent honesty, especially when Taneyev's assessments could show a great deal of perception. Even if the manner in which Taneyev presented his comments made them sting all the more, Tchaikovsky was painfully grateful for his fellow-musician's candor.

Soon after Tchaikovsky completed his ballet The Nutcracker, Taneyev made a piano transcription of the entire work. On finishing his transcription, he gave it to Tchaikovsky, who then made his own alterations to it. (This transcription was published in 1892.)

== Taneyev and The Five ==
Tchaikovsky was not the only one with whom Taneyev was frank, though some were less appreciative of it. Nikolai Rimsky-Korsakov, recalling a clash Taneyev had with Mily Balakirev during a rehearsal of a concert to commemorate the unveiling of a monument to the pioneering Russian composer Mikhail Glinka, wrote:

"At the rehearsal of the concert he publicly declared to Balakirev: 'Mily Alekseyevich! We are dissatisfied with you.' I picture to myself Balakirev constrained to swallow a rebuke of this sort. Honest, upright and straightforward, Taneyev always spoke sharply and frankly. On the other hand, Balakirev, of course, could never forgive Taneyev his harshness and frankness with regard to his own person."

Nor was this the only time Taneyev shared strong opinions about the St Petersburg based nationalist music group known as "The Mighty Handful" or "The Five." Rimsky-Korsakov recalls what he considered Taneyev's glaring conservatism in the 1880s. Taneyev reportedly showed "deep distrust" in Alexander Glazunov's early appearances. Alexander Borodin was merely a clever dilettante, and Modest Mussorgsky "had made him laugh". He may not have had a high opinion of César Cui or even of Rimsky-Korsakov himself. However, Rimsky-Korsakov's study of counterpoint, which Taneyev learned of from Tchaikovsky, may have prompted Taneyev to revise his opinion of that composer.

The following decade showed a marked change in opinion, Rimsky-Korsakov writes. Taneyev now appreciated Glazunov, respected Borodin's work, and regarded only Mussorgsky's compositions with disdain. Rimsky-Korsakov ascribed this change to a new period in Taneyev's activity as a composer. Previously he had been absorbed mainly in research for his treatise on counterpoint, which left him little time for composition. Now he was throwing himself more freely into creative work. In doing so, Taneyev was allowing himself to be guided by the ideals of contemporary music while still preserving "his astounding contrapuntal technique".

Rimsky-Korsakov also writes that, after the fiasco regarding the Mariinsky Theatre's production of Taneyev's Oresteia, Mitrofan Belyayev, the publisher and impresario who now headed the "Mighty Handful", shared Taneyev's outrage over the incident and volunteered to publish the score himself. Prior to its publication, Taneyev "revised and signally improved the orchestration, which had not been uniformly satisfactorily... [T]hereafter, Taneyev began to avail himself of Glazunov's advice in orchestration; of course he made rapid strides in that field". Note the "of course". Glazunov had been Rimsky-Korsakov's student in orchestration as well as composition.

== Taneyev and counterpoint ==
Taneyev's special field of study was counterpoint. He engrossed himself in the music of J. S. Bach, Palestrina, and such Flemish masters as Johannes Ockeghem, Josquin des Prez, and Orlande de Lassus. Eventually, he became one of the greatest of contrapuntalists.

Taneyev published a gigantic two-volume treatise, Moveable Counterpoint in the Strict Style (however, in the 1962 English edition this term appears as convertible counterpoint), the result of 20 years of labor. In it, the laws of counterpoint are broken down, explained, and brought into focus as a branch of pure mathematics. Taneyev used a quotation from Leonardo da Vinci as its inscription: "No branch of study can claim to be considered a true science unless it is capable of being demonstrated mathematically".

An unfinished sequel on Canon and Fugue was published posthumously. During the 20th century, several books were published, which deal with either theoretical or pedagogical issues related to his theory.

Taneyev's focus on strict counterpoint strongly influenced the way he composed his music. He described this process, while discussing his dramatic trilogy Oresteia, in a letter to Tchaikovsky dated 21 June 1891:

I spend a great deal of time on preparatory work, and less time on final composition. Some items I have not finished within the last few years. Important themes which are repeated in the opera, are used by me objectively, without any reference to a particular situation, for studies in counterpoint. Gradually, from this chaos of thoughts and sketches something orderly and definite begins to emerge. Everything extraneous is discarded. That which is unquestionably suitable remains.

Taneyev would continue this series of contrapuntal exercises until he had exhausted every polyphonic possibility. Only then would he actually begin composing music.

Rimsky-Korsakov described Taneyev's compositional process similarly, but with more telling detail:

Before setting out for the real expounding of a composition, Taneyev used to precede it with a multitude of sketches and studies: he used to write fugues, canons, and various contrapuntal interlacings on the individual themes, phrases, and motives of the coming composition; and only after gaining thorough experience in its component parts did he take up the general plan of the composition and the carrying out of this plan, knowing by that time, as he did, and perfectly, the nature of the material he had at his disposal and the possibilities of building with that material.

Taneyev's rationale for this process stemmed from his belief that truth and moral integrity in music were synonymous with its objectivity and purpose. He viewed classical concepts of composition as perfect examples of a compositional technique devoid of anything casual or extraneous.

Taneyev also saw a synthesis of counterpoint and folk-song as the means of creating large-scale musical structures that would follow Western rules of thematic development in sonata form. This goal had eluded both "The Five" and Tchaikovsky. Taneyev wrote:

The task of every Russian composer consists in furthering the creation of national music. The history of western music gives us the answer as to what should be done to attain this: apply to the Russian song the workings of the mind that were applied to the song of western nations and we will have our own national music. Begin with elementary contrapuntal forms, pass to more complex ones, elaborate the form of the Russian fugue, and from there it is only a step to complex instrumental types. The Europeans took centuries to get there, we need far less. We know the way, the goal, we can profit by their experience.

== Music ==
Compositionally, Taneyev and Tchaikovsky differed on how they felt music theory should function. Tchaikovsky prized spontaneity in musical creativity. Taneyev, in contrast, thought musical creativity should be both deliberate and intellectual, with preliminary theoretical analysis and preparation of thematic materials.

As a consequence Taneyev took an intellectual approach in his characterization of the music of his teacher, Tchaikovsky. Nevertheless, Taneyev's compositions reveal his mastery of classical composition technique, so that his style could be said to reflect the European, and especially German, orientation of the Moscow Conservatory, rather than the Russian nationalist outlook of the school of Mily Balakirev.

His compositions include nine complete string quartets (plus two partially completed), a piano quintet, two string quintets and other chamber works, including a piano prelude and fugue in G-sharp minor; four symphonies (only the last one published during his lifetime, and at least one incomplete), a concert suite with violin and a piano concerto, and other orchestral works; an organ composition Chorale with variations; choral and vocal music. Among the choral works are two cantatas, St. John of Damascus, Op. 1 (also known as A Russian Requiem), and At the Reading of a Psalm (Op. 36, sometimes regarded as his swan song). In his choral works the composer combines the melodic basis of the traditional Russian musical style with remarkable contrapuntal writing.

Taneyev regarded his Oresteia, originally conceived in 1882, as his major achievement. This work, which the composer entitled a 'musical trilogy' rather than an opera, was closely modeled on the original plays of Aeschylus and was first performed at the Mariinsky Theatre on 17 October 1895. Taneyev wrote a separate concert overture, based on some of the opera's major themes, which was conducted by Tchaikovsky in 1889.

Rimsky-Korsakov considered many of Taneyev's compositions to be "most dry and laboured in character." A private hearing of Oresteia at his home, with Taneyev at the piano, was quite another matter. The opera, he writes, "astonished us all with pages of extraordinary beauty and expressiveness". He added that Taneyev's working methods "ought to result in a dry and academic composition, devoid of the shadow of an inspiration; in reality, however, Oresteia proved quite the reverse—for all its strict premeditation, the opera was striking in its wealth of beauty and expressiveness."

Along with beauty and expressiveness, Taneyev's music could also show a whimsical streak. Gerald Abraham writes, "Taneyev had a dual nature rather like Lewis Carroll's, half mathematician, half humorist". Among Taneyev's unpublished works are reportedly various parodies, including "Quartets of Government Officials", "humorous choruses, comic fugues and variations, toy symphonies, a mock ballet for Tchaikovsky's birthday with an absurd scenario, and music which is an ingenious contrapuntal pot-pourri of themes from Tchaikovsky's works".

== Selected discography ==
- The Russian Piano Quartet: Taneyev's Piano Quartet in E major, Op. 20; Paul Juon's Rhapsody; and Alexander Borodin's Polovtsian Dances. Performed by the Ames Piano Quartet (Dorian 93215)
- Concert Suite for Violin & Orchestra; Entr'acte; and Oresteya Overture. Performed by the Helsinki Philharmonic Orchestra conducted by Vladimir Ashkenazy and Pekka Kuusisto as violin soloist (Ondine 959-2)
- Trio in E-flat major, Op. 31; Trio in B minor; and Trio in D major. Performed by the Belcanto Strings (MDG 6341003)
- Piano Quintet in G minor, Op. 30; and Piano Trio in D major, Op. 22. Performed by Mikhail Pletnev (piano), Vadim Repin (violin) and Lynn Harrell (cello) joined in the quintet by Ilya Gringolts (violin) and Nobuko Imai (viola) (Deutsche Grammophon 4775419)
- Symphony No. 1; and Symphony No. 3. Performed by the Russian State Symphony Orchestra conducted by Valery Polyansky (Chandos 10390), 2004
- Symphony No. 2; and Symphony No. 4. Performed by the Russian State Symphony Orchestra conducted by Valeri Polyansky (Chandos 9998)
- Symphony No. 4; and the Oresteia Overture, Op. 6. Performed by the Philharmonia Orchestra conducted by Neeme Järvi (Chandos 8953)
- String Quartets 1 and 4. Performed by the Leningrad Taneyev Quartet. Reissue of a Melodiya LP on Northern Flowers NF/PMA 9933 (and the other quartets, in five volumes.)
- String Quartets 8 and 9. Performed by the Leningrad Taneiev Quartet. (Melodiya MA 12411; reissued on Olympia OCD 128)
- Piano Trio in D; Piano Quartet in E. Performed by the Barbican Piano Trio with James Boyd (viola). (Dutton CDSA 6882)

== Bibliography ==
- Convertible Counterpoint in the Strict Style, by Sergei Taneyev. 1962 edition, Branden Pub. Co. ISBN 0-8283-1415-2. Preface by Serge Koussevitzky.
- Doctrine of Canon, 1915 (available in English through ProQuest as part of the dissertation Sergei Ivanovich Taneev's 'Doctrine of the Canon': A translation and commentary (Russia). by Paul R Grove, II.)
- Подвижной контрапунктъ строгаго письма [Moveable counterpoint in the strict style], by Sergei Taneyev. 1st edition. Moscow & Leipzig, Beliaeff, 1909. (available via IMSLP)

== Sources ==
- Bakst, James, A History of Russian-Soviet Music (New York: Dodd, Mean & Company, 1966, 1962).
- Belina, Anastasia. "The Master of Moscow", in International Piano Magazine, January–February 2007, pp. 62–65.
- Brown, David (ed.) Stanley Sadie, "Taneyev, Sergey Ivanovich", The New Grove Dictionary of Music and Musicians, Second Edition, 29 vols. (London: Macmillan, 2001). ISBN 1-56159-239-0.
- Brown, David, Tchaikovsky: The Crisis Years, 1874-1878, (New York: W.W. Norton & Company, 1983). ISBN 9780393017076.
- Hanson, Lawrence and Hanson, Elisabeth, Tchaikovsky: The Man Behind the Music (New York: Dodd, Mead & Company).
- Leonard, Richard Anthony, A History of Russian Music (Westport, Connecticut: Greenwood Press, Publishers, 1977, 1957).
- Poznansky, Alexander, Tchaikovsky Through Others' Eyes (Russian Music Series) (Indiana University Press, 1999).
- Rimsky-Korsakov, Nikolai, Letopis Moyey Muzykalnoy Zhizni (St. Petersburg, 1909), published in English as My Musical Life (New York: Knopf, 1925, 3rd ed. 1942).
- Swan, Alfred J., Russian Music and Its Sources in Chant and Folk-Song (New York: W.W. Norton & Company, 1973). OCLC 702069.
- Warrack, John, Tchaikovsky (New York: Charles Scribner's Sons, 1973).
- Beattie Davis, Richard, "The Beauty of Belaieff" (G Clef Publishing, 2007).
