= Radu Poklitaru =

Ukrainian choreographer and director (born 1972)

- Born: March 22, 1972 (age 54); Chișinău, Moldova
- Known for: Ballet choreography
- Notable work: Artistic manager for the Kyiv Modern-Ballet, 2014 Winter Olympics in Sochi

Radu Poklitaru (born 1972 in Chișinău, Moldova), choreographer-director working in Ukraine and many other countries of the world, the Honoured Worker of Culture of Ukraine (2017), the Shevchenko National Prize of Ukraine winner (2016), The Personality of the Year prize winner (2017), the People's Artist of Moldova (2016), the laureate of numerous international contests, the founder and the chief ballet master of the Kyiv Modern-Ballet Academic Theatre. Professor of the Department of Modern Choreography at the Kyiv National University of Culture and Arts.

== Life and career ==
=== The early years ===
Radu Poklitaru was born on March 22, 1972, in the city of Chișinău, to the family of leading ballet dancers of the Moldova National Opera Ballet Ludmila Nedremska and Vitaliy Poklitaru. He began studying the classical ballet at the age of 4.5 at the Chișinău's Pioneer Palace. He got his professional training at the Moscow State Academy of Choreography (1983—1984), the Ballet School іn Odesa (1984), and the Stephan Niaga Musical School in Chișinău (1985).

In 1986 he was admitted to the Perm State School of Choreography and graduated from it in 1991, his master being Oleksandr Sakharov, (speciality – a ballet dancer). In 1991 he started his work at the National Opera and Ballet of Belarus. He is endowed with the remarkable gift of character dancing and acting.

In 1994 he was admitted to the newly created Department of Choreography at the Belarus Academy of Music. April 21, 1996 is the date of Radu Poklitaru's debut as a choreographer - the first performance of his miniature The Point of Intersection to the music of Arcangelo Corelli, with Olga Gayko and Oleksiy Ovechkin.

In 1999 Radu Poklitaru graduated with degrees in choreography (the class of Valentin Yelizaryev), art studies (the class of Yulia Churko) and choreography theory teaching. His diploma performance was Igor Stravinsky's The Kiss of the Fairy at the National Opera and Ballet of Belarus.

Radu Poklitaru owes his first popularity to the miniatures he created for dancers who took part in international ballet contests. The creative cooperation of the young choreographer and the leading ballet dancers of the Minsk Musical Theatre – Yulia Diatko and Konstantin Kuznetsov proved to be particularly effective. The productions of this artistic trio include the miniatures Bagatel to the music of Ludwig van Beethoven, The Belorussian Lament and His Music to the music of Ritchie Blackmore, Adagio to the music of Peter Tchaikovsky, The Improvisation Against the Background of the Ivy-Covered Wall to the music of Johann Sebastian Bach, Three Georgian Songs, Barcarola to the music of Jacques Offenbach, and also one-act performances Moments based on Konstantin Balmont's poetry, The World Doesn't End at Your Doorstep to the music of Josquin des Prez and Gustav Mahler, The Spectre of the Rose to the music of Karl Weber, In pivo veritas to Celtic folk music and the Renaissance music.

In the season of 2000—2001 Poklitaru worked as the Chief ballet master at the Moldova National Opera Ballet. The change of the national leadership forced him to quit.

From 2001 till 2006 he had no regular appointment. During that period, on the stages of Ukraine, Belarus, Latvia and Russia, he produced ballets which made him famous as one of the principal propagators of modern dancing and progressive ballet direction in the post-Soviet landscape. Pictures at an Exhibition to the music of Modest Mussorgsky and Le Sacre du Printemps of Igor Stravinsky at the National Opera of Ukraine, Seven Deadly Sins by Kurt Weill at the Perm Opera and Ballet Theatre, Cinderella by Sergei Prokofiev at the Latvian National Opera and many other impressive artistic projects of Radu Poklitaru inevitably turned into theatrical events which struck a deep chord with the audience and art elite. In collaboration with the British director Declan Donnellan, Poklitaru produced Sergei Prokofiev's ballet Romeo and Juliet at the Bolshoi Theatre of Russia (2003) which evoked a colossal public resonance; the new, revolutionary version of the famous ballet on the stage of Russia's leading musical theatre was conducive to heated discussions in the media and theatrical lobby.

=== Kyiv Modern-Ballet ===
The history of Kyiv Modern-Ballet begins on December 19, 2005, with the first night of the production Le forze del destino, commissioned by Volodymyr Filippov's Art Foundation, which involved the main creative resources of the would-be theatre: choreographer – Radu Poklitaru, scenographer – Andriy Zlobin, costume artist– Hanna Ipatieva, lighting producer– Olena Antokhina, sound producer – Oleksandr Kuriy, choreographer assistant – Anatoliy Kozlov, and a number of performers who later became a part of the permanent company. On July 18, 2006, the company Kyiv Modern-ballet Theatre Ltd. with Radu Poklitaru as its head was registered and supported by the patron of art Volodymyr Filippov. In the course of all-Ukrainian casting, 16 young dancers were selected. The academic ballet education was not a necessary criterion for being admitted to the company; however, all the performers were professional modern dancers, knowledgeable about classical dancing and capable of conducting a classical lesson.

The authorial project Kyiv Modern-ballet, in which the repertoire and artistic priorities would be based on Radu Poklitaru's unique style and vision, where the artistic quest and daring ideas of the Maestro's young disciples and colleagues would be put to practice, where canons and rules are absent, while creativity and talent are welcome, presented the 2-part ballet Carmen.TV on October 25, 2006, at the Ivan Franko National Academic Drama Theater. That production was awarded two prizes of The Kyiv Pectoral contest – in the nominations The best production of the year and The best plastic interpretation of the production. Olga Kondakova who played the part of Carmen was nominated for The best female performer.

Radu Poklitaru's choreographic language represents a complex synthesis of the authorial plastic creativity and classical dancing.

The freedom of creativity enabled Radu Poklitaru, together with the artists Hanna Ipatieva and Andriy Zlobin, to form, within a short term, the diverse repertoire of his theatre. In 2008 the Theatre was awarded The Kyiv Pectoral prize in the nomination The event of the year for the selection of illustrious new productions: The Verona Myth – Shakespeareriments, Bolero, Rain, and The Nutcracker. The performance at the festivals in France (Time to love, Biarritz), Moldova (The Eugène Ionesco Biennale), Thailand (The Festival of Music and Dance, Bangkok), and Russia (the Mask+ programme at the Golden Mask festival in 2009 and 2010, Moscow; the festival New Horizons at the Mariinsky Theatre, St.Petersburg) testify to the international fame of the Kyiv Modern-ballet theatre.

The years of economic depression took a bitter toll on the Theatre which found itself on the verge of closing down. In 2013, for financial reasons (extremely low salaries), 9 out of 21 performers of the company had to quit. They were replaced by new ones, and the whole repertoire had to be renewed almost from scratch. The productions were made owing to the patrons’ support. The ballet Giselle was supported by Ludmyla Rusalina (the founder of the Petrus-Media holding), a number of projects were assisted by Volodymyr Borodiansky (the then Director General of the STB (TV channel), the head of StarLightMedia group); the direct participation of the businessman Andriy Demydov made the production of The Swan Lake possible.

Its first jubilee, the 10th anniversary, the Kyiv Modern-ballet met with the artistic total of 13 one-act productions and 5 full-length ones, 5 prizes of The Kyiv Pectoral and the ballet festival The Summer in Art Modern Style which was held at the Odesa Opera and Ballet Theater on July 5 – 11, 2015 in honour of the Theatre's 10th anniversary. The choreographer himself regards the founding of his theatre as the main achievement of his life.

The repertoire of the Theatre had all the three ballets of Peter Tchaikovsky's triptych, produced one after another: The Nutcracker in 2007, Swan Lake in 2013, and The Sleeping Beauty in 2018. Radu Poklitaru, as a dancer, used to perform in the classical version of The Sleeping Beauty starting with little pageboys, cavaliers, the wolf with the Little Red Riding Hood and up to the honourable part of the evil fairy Karabos, so I felt extremely happy, as I'd been in love with this music since childhood.

=== Present time ===
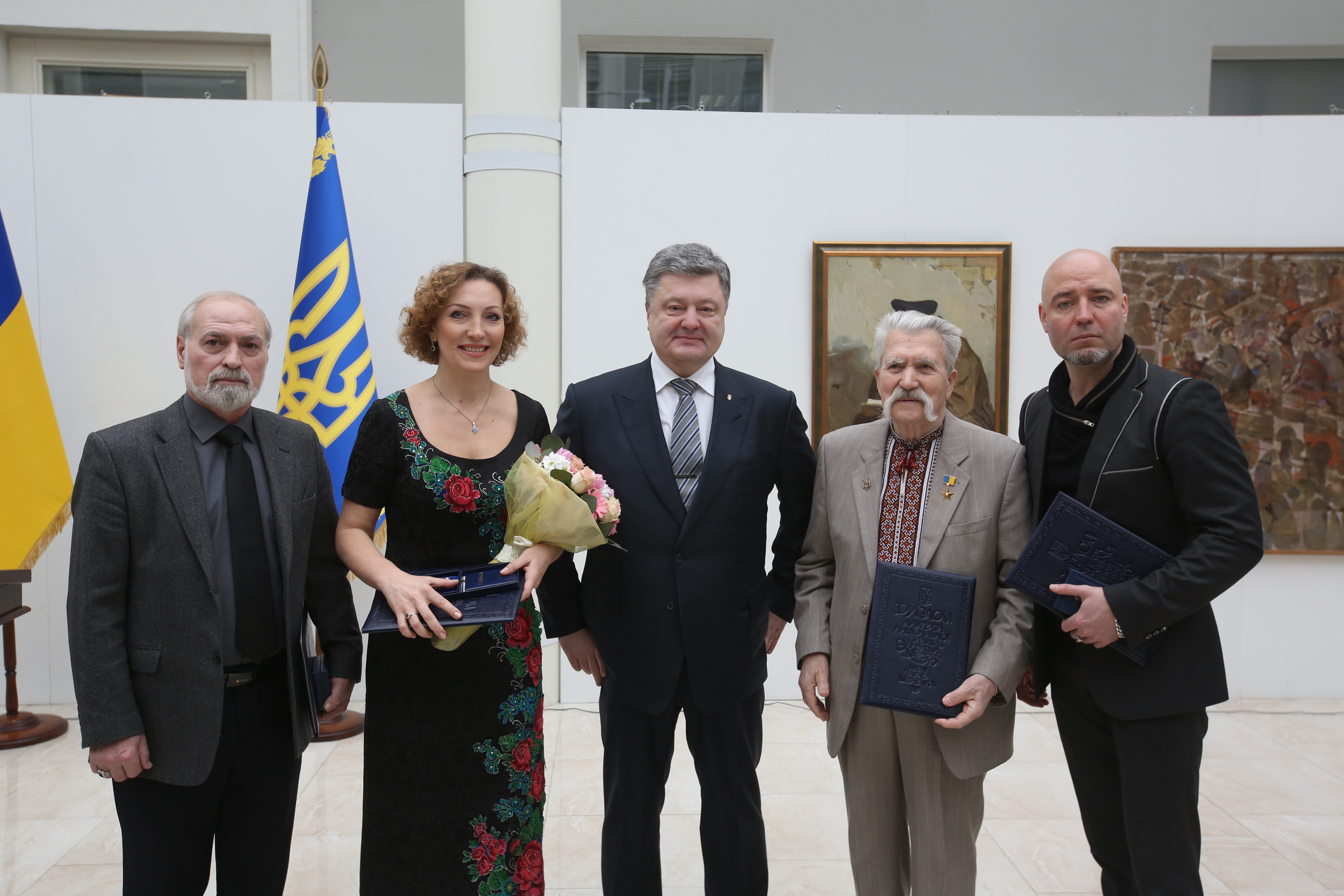
The President of Ukraine Petro Poroshenko with the laureates of the Taras Shevchenko National Prize of Ukraine-2016: the painter Mykhaylo Huida, the singer Anzhelina Shvachka, the publicist Levko Lukianenko, the choreographer Radu Poklitaru

From 2012–2013 Radu Poklitaru was he artistic director of the Kyiv Municipal Academic Opera and Ballet Theatre for Children and Youth in Kyiv.

The work was also carried out beyond Kyiv and Ukraine. In 2013, at the Third Platonov Festival, Poklitaru produced and presented at the Voronezh State Theater of Opera his ballet miniature The Platonov People to the music of Frédéric Chopin. At the invitation of Andriy Boltenko, the Director General of the opening ceremony of the 2014 Winter Olympics in Sochi, Radu Poklitaru was the producer of choreographic compositions. He worked on that project in collaboration with Andriy Musorin, the former leading dancer of the Odesa Opera and Ballet Theater, and Oleksandr Leshchenko, the first prize-winner of May-dance, with over 440 performers being involved. The mini-ballet Natasha Rostova's First Ball, to various music, with the actual and former stars of the Bolshoi and Mariinsky Theatres participating – Svetlana Zakharova, Vladimir Vasiliev, Ivan Vasiliev, Aleksandr Petukhov, Danila Korsuntsev, was presented at the opening ceremony.

In 2016 Poklitaru was awarded with the prestigious Shevchenko National Prize of Ukraine in the area of musical art for a number of productions: the ballet-triptych The Intersection (2012), Swan Lake (2013), Women in D-Moll and The Long Christmas Dinner (2014). That same year Radu Poklitaru received the title of the People's Artist of Moldova and on Ukraine's Independence Day, August 24, 2017 – the title of the Honoured Figure of Art of Ukraine.

Since 2018 Radu Poklitaru has been the head ballet master of the communal enterprise Theatrical and entertainment establishment of culture “Academic `Kyiv Modern-ballet` Theatre. On March 24, 2017, he became the winner of the XXII National Prize The Personality of the Year in the nomination The Figure of Art of the Year.

As of today, Poklitaru is the author of over forty one-act and full-length productions and theatrical scenes in operas in a number of theatres including the National Theatres of Moldova, Latvia, Belarus, the Czech Republic, Serbia and Ukraine, the Bolshoi Theatre of Russia, the Moskva Russian Chamber Ballet, the Stanislavski and Nemirovich-Danchenko Theatre in Moscow.

=== Cinema and television ===
Radu Poklitaru makes his appearance on TV both as a guest and a participant of a programme. In 2011 he became a judge of the 4th season of the Tantsi z zirkamy show on the 1+1 TV channel; in 2012 – a judge of the Everybody Dance! show on the STB TV channel (the collaboration lasted through the fifth to the ninth seasons); in 2015 he was a judge of the dancing contest Go Dancing! on the Channel One Russia. The general opinion of Poklitaru's judging is strict but fair.

In the project Everybody Dance! (in Ukrainian: Танцюють всі!) (2012-2014), Poklitaru combined the functions of the judge with creating turns for participants. As reviewers pointed out, his productions were distinguished by well-composed dramaturgy and unconventional decisions. The turns which Radu produced were called little theatrical masterpieces born in the TV format. The 4th season of the project presented the following masterpieces: the productions for 5 the duets: Kateryna Beliavska and Rodion Farhshatov, Halyna Pekha and Anatoliy Sachivko, Lidia Soklakova and Ivan Drozdov.

Radu Poklitaru played his own self — cameo — as a judge of a dancing teleshow in the feature film After You're Gone (2016) produced by Anna Matison. Before that, he appeared in bit parts in the films The Tale of the Valiant Knight Fet-Frumos (1977) and The Dancing Ghosts based on Yuriy Korotkov's short novel Wilis (1992).

Radu Poklitaru created the main dancing turn in the feature film The Petrushka Syndrome produced by Elena Khazanova and based on Dina Rubina's novel of the same name. The production was made specially for the performers Yevgeny Mironov and Chulpan Khamatova.

== Choreography director works ==
The State Musical Theatre in Minsk

- One-act ballet Moments based on Konstantin Balmont's poetry, 1998
- One-act ballet The World Doesn't End at Your Doorstep to the music of Josquin des Prez and Gustav Mahler, 1999
- One-act ballet Le Spectre de la rose to the music of Carl Maria von Weber, 2001
- One-act ballet In pivo veritas to the Celtic folk music and the Renaissance music, 2002

National Opera and Ballet of Belarus in Minsk

- One-act ballet The Fairy's Kiss of Igor Stravinsky, 1999

Moldova National Opera Ballet

- One-act ballet Carmen to the musical fantasy based on Georges Bizet's opera, 2001
- One-act ballet Boléro of Maurice Ravel, 2003
- One-act ballet Waltz to the music of Maurice Ravel, 2003
- Princess АТЕХ, or the Revelations of a Chazar Princess – mono-opera of Gennadiy Chobanu (in collaboration with Peter Vutkareu), 2005

National Opera of Ukraine in Kyiv

- One-act ballet Pictures at an Exhibition to the music of Modest Mussorgsky's suite, 2002
- One-act ballet The Rite of Spring of Igor Stravinsky, 2002

Bolshoi Theatre in Moscow

- Two-act ballet Romeo and Juliet by Sergei Prokofiev (in collaboration with Declan Donnellan), 2003
- One-act ballet Ward No. 6 to the music of Arvo Pärt, 2004
- Two-act ballet Hamlet based on William Shakespeare's play to the music of the 5th and 15th symphonies of Dmitri Shostakovich (director Declan Donnellan, scenographer Nick Ormerod), 2015

The Moskva Russian Chamber Ballet

- One-act ballet Othello's Birthday to the music of Sergei Prokofiev, 2004

Perm Opera and Ballet Theatre

- Ballet with singing The Seven Deadly Sins by Kurt Weill, 2004

Latvian National Opera

- Two-act ballet Cinderella by Sergei Prokofiev, 2005
- Two-act ballet Cinderella to the music of Oleg Khodosko, 2006

Mariinsky Theatre in Saint Petersburg

- One-act ballet The Symphony in Three Movements to the music of Igor Stravinsky, 2015

The National Theatre (Národní divadlo), Prague

- The Rain a choreographic fantasy to the world folk melodies and to the music of Johann Sebastian Bach, 2016

National Theatre in Belgrade (Narodno Pozorište u Beogradu), Belgrade

- Women in D-Moll to the music of Johann Sebastian Bach, 2016
- The Long Christmas Dinner to the music of Antonio Vivaldi, 2016

Others

- Quo Vadis? to the music of Sofia Gubaidulina and Moldavian folk tunes (The Belorussian Choreographic College), 1999
- Women in D-Moll to the music of Johann Sebastian Bach (The K.Dankevych School of Arts and Culture in Odesa), 2001
- Carmen Suite by Rodion Shchedrin – Georges Bizet (The K.Dankevich School of Arts and Culture in Odesa), 2002
- Cantata to the music of Johann Sebastian Bach (The Perm State Choreographic School), 2005
- Two for the Seesaw to the music of Johann Sebastian Bach and Chavela Vargas (Gala-concert Igor Kolb and friends on the stage of the Bunkamura Centre in Tokyo, Japan), 2009

Kyiv Modern-Ballet in Kyiv

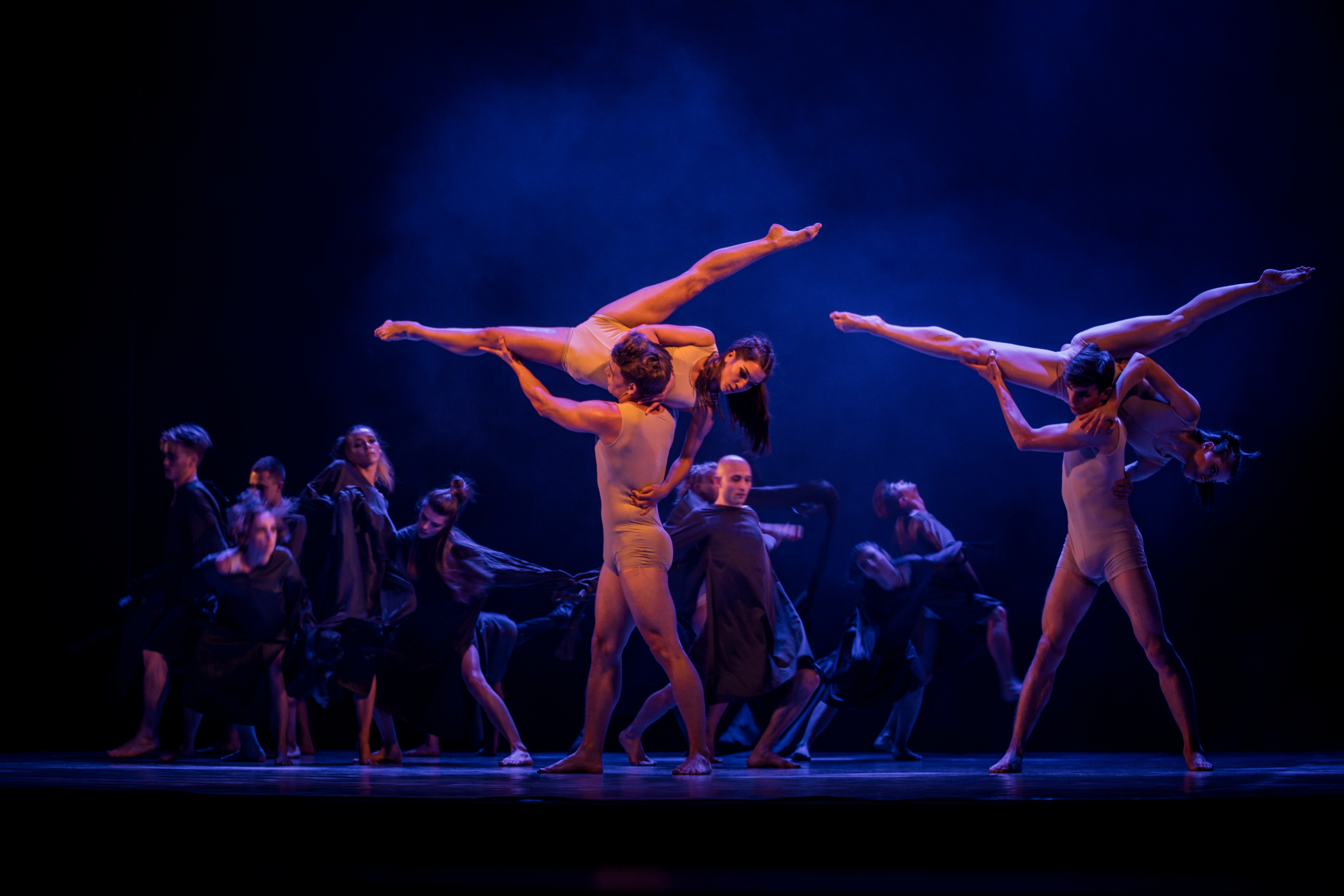
Scene from the ballet Boléro

- «Le forze del destino» — opera-ballet to the music of Giuseppe Verdi, Arrigo Boito, Giacomo Puccini, Camille Saint-Saëns, Alfredo Catalani, 2005
- Two-part ballet Carmen.TV to the music of Georges Bizet, 2006
- Two-act ballet Romeo and Juliet (Shakespeareriments) to the music of Pyotr Tchaikovsky, George Handel and the Renaissance music, based on Shakespeare's plays, 2007
- One-act ballet Rain to the music of Johann Sebastian Bach and folk music of the world, 2007
- One-act ballet Boléro of Maurice Ravel, 2007
- Two-act ballet The Nutcracker of Pyotr Tchaikovsky, 2007
- One-act ballet Underground to the music of Pēteris Vasks, 2008
- One-act ballet Ward No. 6 to the music of Arvo Pärt, 2008
- One-act ballet Two for the Seesaw to the music of Johann Sebastian Bach and Chavela Vargas based on William Gibson's play of the same name, 2009
- One-act ballet Quartet-à-tête to the music of Ad Maas, 2010
- Divertissement of modern choreography Con tutti i strumenti, 2010
- One-act ballet In pivo veritas to the Celtic folk music and the Renaissance music, 2011
- The ballet-triptych The Intersection to the music of Myroslav Skoryk (co-production with the National Opera of Ukraine), 2012
- One-act ballet Hereven to the music of Volodymyr Nikolaiev (co-production with the Perm Opera and Ballet Theatre), 2012
- Two-act ballet Swan Lake of Pyotr Tchaikovsky, 2013
- One-act ballet Women in D-Moll to the music of Johann Sebastian Bach, 2014
- One-act ballet The Long Christmas Dinner to the music of Antonio Vivaldi, based on Thornton Wilder's play, 2014
- Two-act ballet Giselle of Adolphe Adam, 2016
- One-act ballet Up the River to the music of Oleksandr Rodin, based on F. Scott Fitzgerald's The Curious Case of Benjamin Button, 2017
- Two-act ballet The Sleeping Beauty of Pyotr Tchaikovsky, based on the fairy-tale by Giambattista Basile, 2018
- Two-act ballet Viy of Oleksandr Rodin, based on Mykola Gogol's tale, 2019
- Two-act ballet The Little Prince to the music of Wolfgang Amadeus Mozart and Ukrainian lullabies performed by Maria Pylypchak, based on the tale by Antoine de Saint-Exupéry, 2020
- One-act ballet Nine Rendezvous to the music of Frédéric Chopin, 2021
- Two-act ballet The Queen of Spades to the music of Pyotr Tchaikovsky (the Second and Sixth Symphonies), 2021
- One-act ballet Tomorrow to the music of Frédéric Chopin, 2023

== Choreographic miniatures ==
- The Point of Intersection to the music of Arcangelo Corelli (1996)
- The Prelude and the Fugue to the music of Johann Sebastian Bach (1996)
- The Legend of Pan's Flute to the music of Gheorghe Zamfir (1996)
- The Mirror to the music of Frédéric Chopin (1996)
- Siciliana to the music of Gabriel Fauré (1996)
- The Waltz in a Thousand Beats to the music of Jacques Brel (1996)
- The Three Graces to the music of Frédéric Chopin (1996)
- Bagatelle to the music of Ludwig van Beethoven (1997)
- The Night Flowers to the music of Claude Debussy (1998)
- The Belorussian Lament to the music of the Camerata vocal group (1998)
- An Old Gramophone Record to the song performed by Mario Lanza (1998)
- His Music to the music of Bobby McFerrin (1998)
- The Awakening to the music of Maurice Ravel (1998)
- The Spanish Arietta to the music of Yugo Kanno (1999)
- Lacrimosa to the music of Wolfgang Amadeus Mozart (1999)
- Muzette to the music of Bobby McFerrin (2000)
- Adagio to the music of Peter Tchaikovsky (2000)
- Two Romances to the music of Mikhail Glinka (2000)
- The Improvisation Against the Background of the Ivy-Covered Wall to the music of Johann Sebastian Bach (2000)
- Three Georgian Songs to the Georgian folk vocal polyphony (2001)
- The Sailed-Away Rus to the music of Georgy Sviridov (2001)
- Chokirlia to the Moldavian folk music (2001)
- The Non-Classical Variation to the music of Ludwig Minkus (2001)
- Three Ancient Dances of the Renaissance Epoch to the music of Renaissance (2002)
- Luv-off to the music of Wolfgang Amadeus Mozart (2002)
- Mazurka to the music of Frédéric Chopin (2002)
- Three Rumanian Songs to the Rumanian folk music (2002)
- Marlene to the song performed by Marlene Dietrich (2003)
- The Russian One to the music of Peter Tchaikovsky (2003)
- The Wedding to the music of Goran Bregovic (2003)
- Exercise to the music of J mix (2003)
- Lullaby to the music of the Ivan Kupala group (2003)
- We were boating together to the Russian folk music (2003)
- The Swan to the music of Camille Saint-Saëns (2004)
- Provincial Dances to the music of Frédéric Chopin — A.Glazunov (2004)
- We Are Dancing to Pergolesi to the music of Giovanni Pergolesi (2008)
- The Ages of Love to the music of Antonio Vivaldi (2009)
- Barcarola to the music of Jacques Offenbach (2009)
- Con tutti instrumenti to the music of Antonio Salieri (2010)
- The Blind to the music of Frédéric Chopin (2011)
- Do you want to the music of Zemfira (2011)
- Saraband to the music of Georg Handel (2012) (dedicated to Ekaterina Maximova)
- We don't renounce when in love to the music of Mark Minkov (2012)
- ’Juno’ and ‘With luck’ to the music of Alexey Rybnikov (2012)
- Orpheus and Eurydice to the music of Adagio Albinoni (2012)
- Misfortune to the music of Vladimir Vysotsky (2012)
- The Voice to the music of Alfredo Catalani (2013)
- The details of interrelations to the music of Johann Sebastian Bach (2017) (dedicated to Valentin Yelizariev)
- Spring. Summer. Autumn. Winter to the music of A.Raskatov (2018)

== Filmography ==
- The Tale of the Valiant Knight Fet-Frumos (produced by Vlad Ioviță and Nicolae Esinencu, Moldova-Film studios, 1977)
- The Dancing Ghosts (produced by Yefim Reznikov, Yuriy Korotkov, Granat-film studios, 1992)
- The Petrushka Syndrome (produced by Elena Khazanova, The Third Rome Studio Ltd, 2015)
- After You're Gone (produced by Anna Matison, Sergey Bezrukov Film Company, 2016)

== Professional and public activities ==
- Judge of The Artek Fouetté International Contest of Young Ballet Dancers jury
- Fixed-term judge of the Arabesque International Contest of Ballet Dancers jury (in Perm) since 2002
- Judge of the Serge Lifar International Contest of Ballet Dancers and Choreographers (Donetsk, Ukraine), 2011
- Professor of the Department of Modern Choreography at the Kyiv National University of Culture and Arts, 2011
- Judge of the International Contest of Ballet Dancers jury in Varna, Bulgaria (2016 and 2018)
- Fixed-term judge and the head of the jury of the International Festival of Modern Choreography in Vitebsk (IFMC)

== Acknowledgment and awards ==
- The Oleg Danovski International Contest (Romania) — the best turn of modern choreography, 1999
- The Music of the World International Festival (Italy) — the best one-act ballet, 1999
- The Serge Lifar International Contest of Ballet Dancers and Choreographers (Ukraine) — the 3rd Prize in the contest of choreographers and the Special Prize of the "Mir iskusstva" ("The World of Art") magazine («Quo Vadis?» to the music of Sofia Gubaidulina), 1999
- The International Contest of Ballet Dancers and Choreographers (Varna, Bulgaria) — the 1st Prize for the best modern choreography, 2000
- The International Contest of Modern Choreography (Vitebsk, Belarus) — the Special Prize for the best choreography, 2000
- The Arabesques International Contest of Ballet Dancers (Russia) — the Prize for the best turn of modern choreography, 2000
- The International Contest of Ballet Dancers and Choreographers (Moscow, Russia) — the 1st Prize in the contest of choreographers, 2001
- The Serge Lifar International Contest of Ballet Dancers and Choreographers (Ukraine) — the 1st prize in the contest of choreographers, 2001
- The Kyiv Pectoral theatrical prize (Ukraine) — for the best musical production (the ballet Le Sacre du Printemps by Igor Stravinsky), the best work of the ballet master, 2002
- The Kyiv Pectoral theatrical prizes of the 2006/07 season in the nominations The best drama production and The best plastic interpretation of the production (the ballet Carmen. TV to the music of Georges Bizet, 2007
- The Kyiv Pectoral theatrical prize-winner of the 2007/08 season in the nomination The event of the year (the productions of Kyiv Modern-Ballet theatre in the choreography of Radu Poklitaru: Bolero of Maurice Ravel, Rain to the music of Johann Sebastian Bach; The Verona Myth: Shakespearements to the music of George Handel, Peter Tchaikovsky and the Renaissance music; The Nutcracker by Peter Tchaikovsky), 2008
- The International Contest of Ballet Dancers and Choreographers (Varna, Bulgaria) — the 1st Prize for the best modern choreography, 2008
- The Arabesques International Contest of Ballet Dancers (Russia) — the Prize for the best turn of modern choreography, 2010
- The Kyiv Pectoral theatrical prize-winner of the 2012/13 season in the nomination The best musical production (the ballet-triptych The Intersection to the music of Myroslav Skoryk), 2013
- The Kyiv Pectoral theatrical prize (Ukraine) — for the best production and the best work of the ballet master (the ballet The Swan Lake of Pyotr Tchaikovsky, 2014
- The Laureate of the Shevchenko National Prize in the nomination Musical Art (the ballets The Swan Lake, Women in D-Moll, The Long Christmas Dinner and the ballet-triptych The Intersection), 2016
- The People's Artist of Moldova, 2016
- The Honoured Figure of Culture of Ukraine, 2017
- The Laureate of the XXII National Prize The Personality of the Year–2017 in the nomination The Artistic Figure of the Year, 2018
- The Kyiv Pectoral theatrical prizes of the 2019/20 season in the nominations The best plastic interpretation of the production (the ballet Viy of Oleksandr Rodin), 2020

== Literature ==
- Елена Узун. Свободный танец Раду Поклитару. / Elena Uzun. The Free Dance of Radu Poklitaru. — Кишинів: «Elan INC» (типографія «Elan Poligraf»), 2012. — 158 с. — ISBN 978-9975-4251-2-4
