= Kyiv Modern-Ballet =

Ukrainian theatre of modern choreography

Coordinates: 50.46561°N 30.51812°E

- Київ Модерн-балет
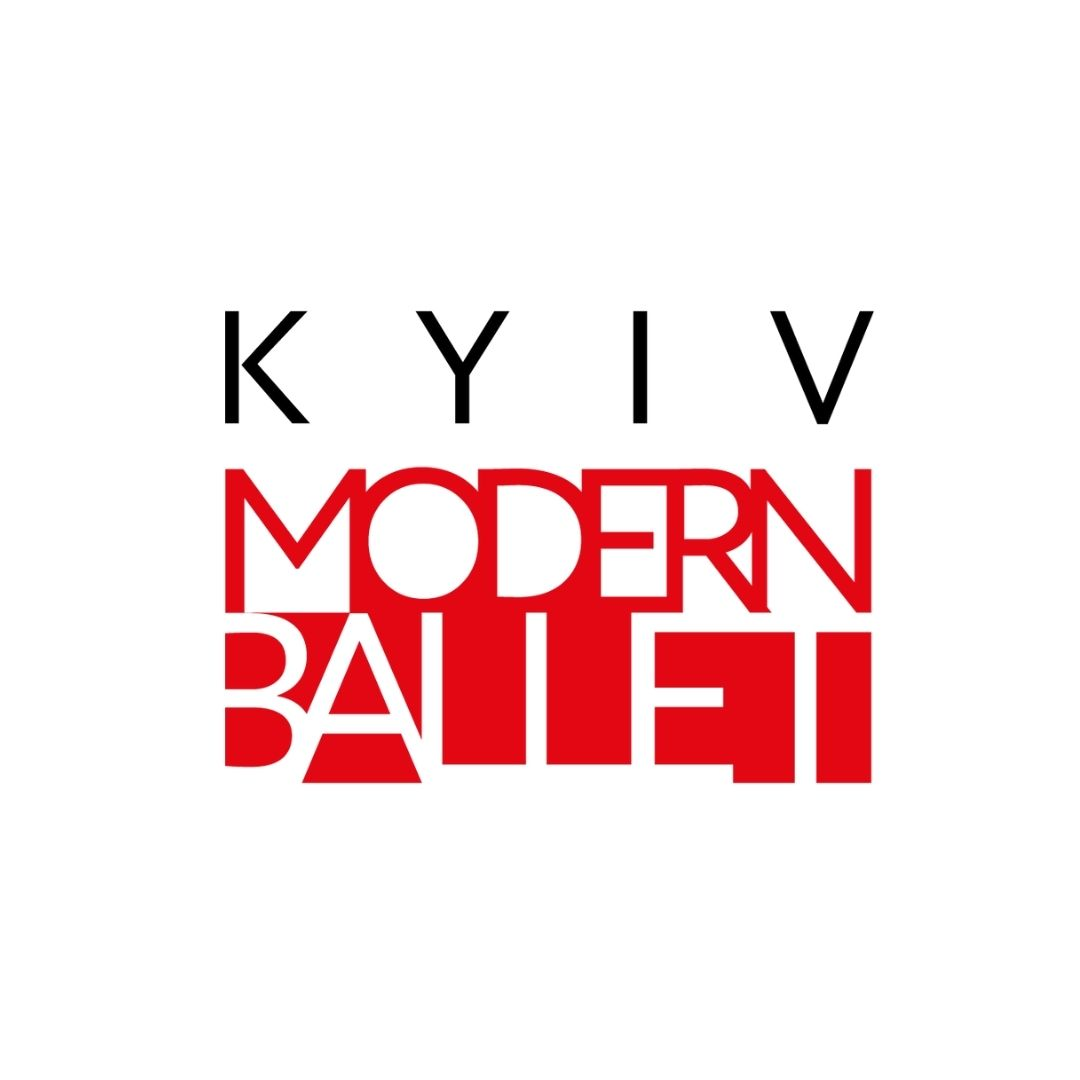
- Interactive map of Kyiv Modern-Ballet
- Address: 2 Mezhyhirska St. Kyiv; Ukraine

Construction
- Opened: December 19, 2005

Website
- kyivmodernballet.com

The Academic Kyiv Modern-ballet Theatre (Ukrainian: «Київ Модерн-балет», fully titled Communal facility 'Theatrical and entertainment establishment of culture "Academic Kyiv Modern-ballet Theatre"') is a Ukrainian theatre of modern choreography, which was designed as authorial, with the repertoire and artistic priorities being determined by the production of one, single choreographer.

This theatre describes its aim as creating a laboratory of modern dance with experimental productions, original interpretations of well-known theatrical stories, and new approaches to form and language of modern dancing. The company tours regularly, both in Ukraine and abroad. Its founder and chief ballet master is Radu Poklitaru, an Honoured Worker of Art of Ukraine, a laureate of the Shevchenko National Prize and a People's Artist of Moldova.

== History ==
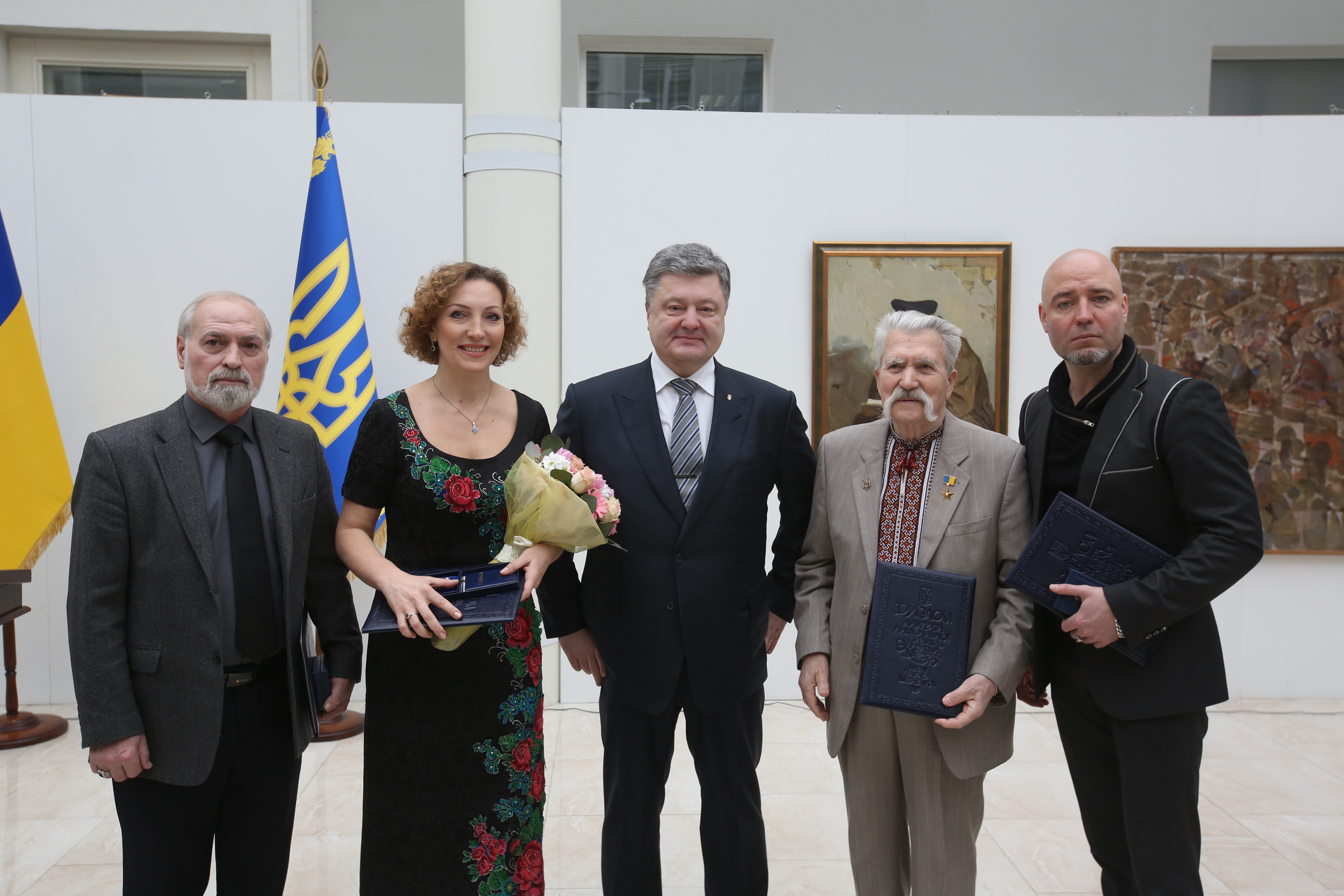
The Ceremony of awarding the winners of the Shevchenko National Prize of Ukraine-2016: the President of Ukraine Petro Poroshenko with the laureates (the painter Mykhaylo Huida, the singer Anzhelina Shvachka, the publicist Levko Lukianenko, the choreographer Radu Poklitaru)

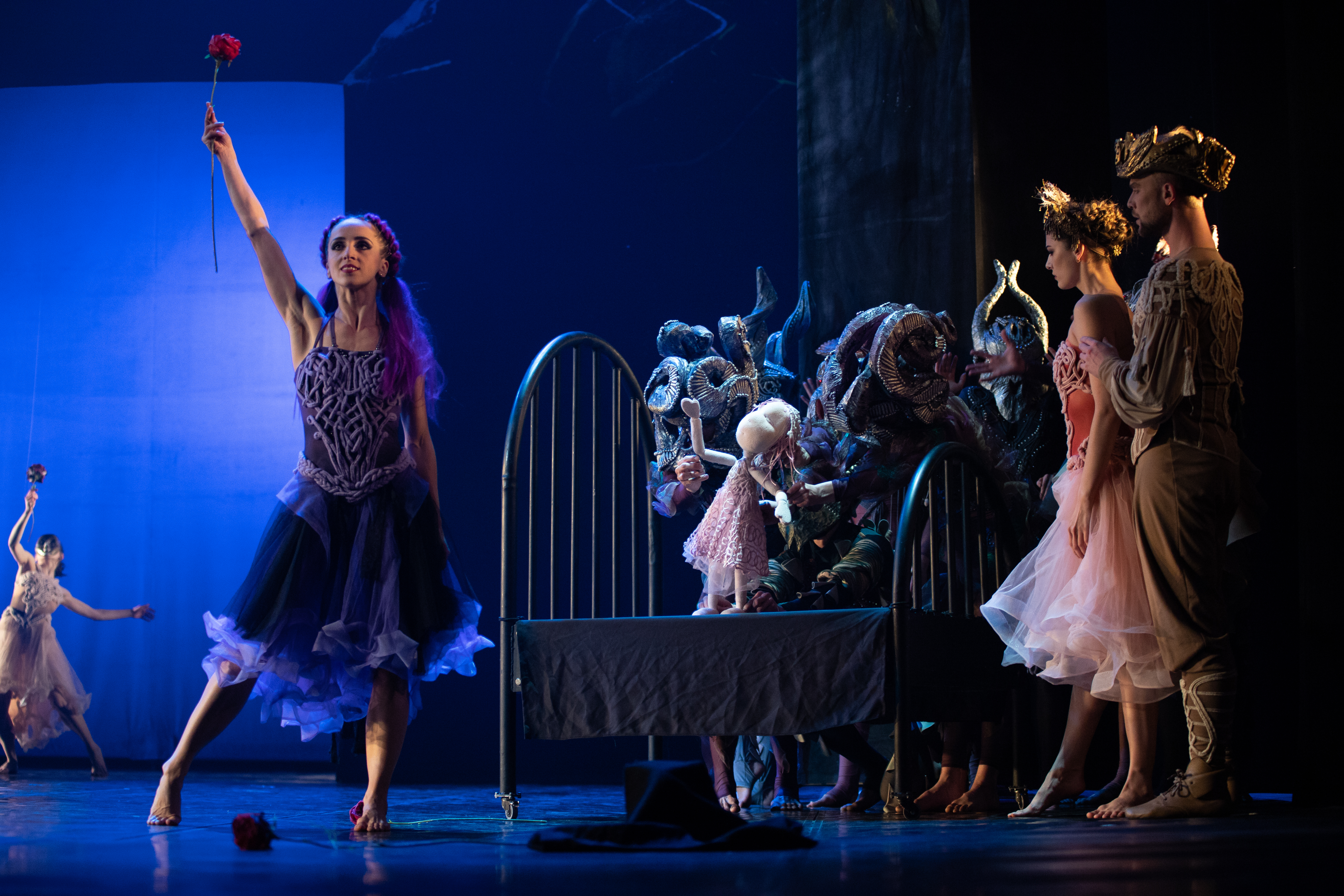
Scene from the ballet The Sleeping Beauty

The history of Kyiv Modern-ballet begins on December 19, 2005, with the first night of the production Le forze del destino (Ukrainian: «Le forze del destino / Сили долі»), commissioned by Volodymyr Filippov's Art Foundation, which involved the main creative resources of the would-be theatre – choreographer Radu Poklitaru, scenographer Andriy Zlobin, costume artist Hanna Ipatieva, lighting producer Olena Antokhina, sound producer Oleksandr Kuriy, choreographer assistant Anatoliy Kozlov, and a number of performers who later became a part of the permanent company.

The one-act production Le forze del destino reproduced the atmosphere of the old theatre of the 1930s – 1940s, with its diverse soft scenery; in which the new interpretation of the classical opera hits (the arrangement of Pavlo Shevchuk) was performed by Olena Hrebeniuk (soprano), and the intense action was described in reviews as follows: "It is difficult to discern the precise contents of the production; the title, however, comes the closest to it. This collage of opera airs is "cemented" by the leit-motif of Verdi's opera La forza del destino, which sounds each time in different modifications."

The company Kyiv Modern-ballet Theatre Ltd. with Radu Poklitaru as its head was registered on July 18, 2006, and supported by the patron of art Volodymyr Filippov. In the course of all-Ukrainian casting, 16 young dancers were selected. The academic ballet education was not a necessary criterion for being admitted to the company; however, all the performers were professional modern dancers, knowledgeable about classical dancing and capable of conducting a classical lesson.

The two-part ballet Carmen.TV to the music of Georges Bizet was first presented on October 25, 2006, at the Ivan Franko National Academic Drama Theater. The production was awarded two prizes of The Kyiv Pectoral contest – in the nominations The best production of the year and The best plastic interpretation of the production. Olga Kondakova who played the part of Carmen was nominated for The best female performer. In 2008 the Theatre was awarded The Kyiv Pectoral prize in the specially established nomination The event of the year for the selection of illustrious new productions: The Verona Myth: Shakespearements to the music of Pyotr Tchaikovsky, George Handel and the Renaissance music (2006), Bolero of Maurice Ravel (2007); Rain to the music of Johann Sebastian Bach and folk music of the world (2007), and The Nutcracker of Pyotr Tchaikovsky (2007).

In collaboration with the National Opera of Ukraine the ballet-triptych The Intersection to the music of Myroslav Skoryk was produced; the one-act ballet Hereven to the music of Vladimir Nikolaev is the co-production with the Perm Opera and Ballet Theatre (both in 2012).

The year of 2013 turned out to be critical for the company when the Theatre found itself on the verge of closing down. The ballet Swan Lake of Pyotr Tchaikovsky was thought to become the last production in the history of the Theatre. For financial reasons (exceedingly low salaries) 9 out of 21 performers of the company had to quit. They were replaced by new ones, and the whole repertoire had to be renewed almost from scratch. The productions were made owing to the patrons' support. The ballet Giselle was supported by Ludmyla Rusalina (the founder of the Petrus-Media holding), a number of projects were assisted by Volodymyr Borodiansky (the then Director General of the STB (TV channel), the head of StarLightMedia group); the direct participation of the businessman Andriy Demydov made the production of Swan Lake possible.

In March 2016 the productions of Kyiv Modern-ballet (he ballets Swan Lake, Women in D-Moll, The Long Christmas Dinner and the ballet-triptych The Intersection) directed by Radu Poklitaru were honoured with the Shevchenko National Prize of Ukraine in the nomination Musical Art. The application of the National Academy of Arts of Ukraine specifically pointed out that The semantic polyphony of dancing created by the maestro reproduces the intense dynamics and the vocabulary of "encoded" metaphors and sophisticated symbols, highlighting the dramatic depths of existence in the first place.

From 2009 until 2017 the Kyiv Modern-ballet company was incorporated into the Kyiv Municipal Academic Opera and Ballet Theatre for Children and Youth, with most of the company's ballet productions being performed on its stage.

On October 5, 2017, the communal enterprise Theatrical and entertainment establishment of culture "Kyiv Modern-ballet Theatre" was founded according to the decision of the Kyiv City Council as of June 22, No610/2772 On founding the theatrical and entertainment establishment of culture "Kyiv Modern-ballet Theatre" by separating it from the theatrical and entertainment establishment of culture Kyiv Municipal Academic Opera and Ballet Theatre for Children and Youth". It was specifically indicated that the theatrical and entertainment establishment of culture 'Kyiv Modern-ballet' Theatre is the legal successor of a part of property, rights and duties of the communal enterprise the theatrical and entertainment establishment of culture The Kyiv Municipal Academic Opera and Ballet Theatre for Children and Youth.

In November 2017 the Theatre was assigned the rank of academic by the order of the Ministry of Culture of Ukraine No1176 On assigning the rank of 'academic' to the company of the communal enterprise "The theatrical and entertainment establishment of culture "'Kyiv Modern-ballet' Theatre" as of November 8.

In February 2018 the Theatre was renamed the communal enterprise The theatrical and entertainment establishment of culture "The Academic Theatre 'Kyiv Modern-ballet' according to the decision of the Kyiv City Council as of February 8 No11/4075 On renaming the communal enterprise "The theatrical and entertainment establishment of culture 'Kyiv Modern-ballet' Theatre. The company numbers 23 performers.

Four productions of Kyiv Modern-ballet were shortlisted for the rating poll The Kyiv Score, which promulgated the list of the best Ukrainian productions of the 2000s in January 2021. 15 Ukrainian drama critics took part in the poll and included the productions The Long Christmas Dinner (2014), Carmen. TV (2006), No 6 Ward in The Kyiv Score.

== The singularity of productions ==
Plots

Theatre reviews describe Radu Poklitaru as a wizard of choreography, who inspires a new life in old fairy tales on the ballet stage – The Nutcracker, The Little Prince, Swan Lake.... Every new production of the company is based on the original interpretation of some apparently familiar story through the prism of Poklitaru's vision. Thus, only the characters' names are retained from the classical plot of Prosper Mérimée's short novel Carmen – a village girl Michaela becomes the central figure: this dreamy blond is captivated by the world of television serials (hence the title of the production Carmen. TV); his Giselle is not a sweet country girl, but an unfortunate child of a big modern city; the first episode of Swan Lake begins with the murderous shooting of a swan family and the subsequent care of the rescued cygnet by the infernal Lord Rotbar; the story of the Nutcracker is not focused on a liitle daughhter of wealthy parents – it centers round a teenager, a backfisch who has to go begging in the cold, snow-covered streets of a big city and then has a wonderful dream, falling asleep in the open.

The company has no inaccessible plots for the ballet; Poklitaru translates into the language of plastic arts F. Scott Fitzgerald's The Mysterious Story of Benjamin Button (Up the River); he combines, daringly, the story of The Little Prince by Antoine de Saint-Exupéry with Mozart's early music аnd Ukrainian lullabies performed by Maria Pylypchak; he tells Pushkin's story The Queen of Spades using the music of Pyotr Tchaikovsky, only not the expected one of the opera of the same name, but his Second and Sixth Symphonies. The productions are exciting, up-to-date, ironic and, at times, comic, even bordering on mockery (In Pivo Veritas).

Artistic interpretation

The artistic images of the ballets Carmen. TV, Shakespearements, Rain and Underground were developed by the scenic artist Hanna Ipatieva, a graduate of the National Academy of Visual Arts and Architecture (the class of Professor Mykola Storozhenko). Hanna's scenery for Giselle is inspired by the prints of graphic works (Mykola Honcharov's) as the imagery language for theatrical costumes. The scenography (Carmen. TV, Shakespearements, Underground) is created by Andriy Zlobin, the Honoured Worker of Arts of Ukraine, a graduate of the Lviv National Academy of Arts (the class of Eugene Lysyk)]. The scenic interpretation of productions is done in modern style (for instance, the action of the ballet Giselle is transferred to dilapidated slums of a present-day megapolis). The scenic artist Oleksandr Druhanov used the engravings of Denis Diderot in the scenery of the ballet-triptych The Intersection (2012) and brought the 3D-animation to the stage. The permanent sound producer of all projects of the Theatre is Oleksandr Kuriy.

The laconism of visual highlights becomes symbolic. The delicate, vulnerable, as though naked, Rose has only one ornament – a luxurious bright royal bud. There is a solitary coat-rack on the stage with various clothing accessories the inhabitants of the Planets - and that coat-rack eloquently implies that all the characters are to be looked for in coils up in a tight knot or uncoils to a gigantic length like the banner of the Evil itself, who acquires the unbelievable plasticity and the scenic expressivity of movements owing to the visual effect of the performers' black-and-white costumes which become, for a few eerie moments of the ballet, parts of his flexible and omnipotent body.

— Anna Arhipova on the costumes for the ballet The Little Prince

In 2014, the costume artist Dmytro Kuriata joined the producing group in the ballets Women in D-Moll, The Long Christmas Dinner (both in 2014), Up the River (2016), The Sleeping Beauty (2018), Viy (2019), The Little Prince (2020), and The Queen of Spades (2021). Since 2019, Olga Nikitina has been the art director of video projections; she developed the 3D mapping for the ballets Viy (2019) and The Little Prince (2020) and the continuum of added reality for The Queen of Spades project (2021), similar to the replenished reality and hybrid reality.

Music

The musical component of productions has a wide range from canonical ballet scores (Boléro of Maurice Ravel, Swan Lake of Pyotr Tchaikovsky, Giselle of Adolphe Adam and others), to authorial musical compilations (Two for the Seesaw to the music of Johann Sebastian Bach and Chavela Vargas, The Little Prince to the music of Wolfgang Amadeus Mozart and Ukrainian lullabies, In pivo veritas to the Irish folk music and the music of Renaissance, The Queen of Spades to the music of Second and the Sixth symphonies of Pyotr Tchaikovsky, etc) and original musical compositions (the ballet Viy includes the recording of Oleksandr Rodin's opus performed by the National Symphony Orchestra of Ukraine). Radu Poklitaru puts it like this, ...in most cases, my choreography is based on the musical material which is generally referred to as "classical music". It can be modern academic classical music, or the Baroque music, or the music of some earlier times. But, in each case, it is classical, even if I sometimes resort to bardic songs and folklore – these are the three foundations for my entire choreography.

The history of Kyiv Modern-ballet registers a few productions the music for which was written specially. Those include the one-act ballet Hereven to the music of Vladimir Nikolaiev (co-production with the Perm Opera and Ballet Theatre, 2012) and the ballet-triptych The Intersection to the music of Myroslav Skoryk (co-production with the National Opera of Ukraine). Maestro Skoryk himself was the conductor of his work during the performances of The Intersection. The two-act ballet Viy (2019) to the music of the Ukrainian composer Oleksandr Rodin also belongs here.

Any new production of Radu Poklitaru is always the anticipation of the Maestro's new discovery, of a new trend in the modern art of choreography and, additionally, it is the certainty of coming into contact with the eternal values of Spirituality and Beauty, Kindness and Love.

— Lessia Olynyk, musicologist

Choreography

Kyiv Modern-ballet is the authorial theatre whose repertoire comprises, by and large, the original productions of its founder Radu Poklitaru, which have become the most valuable possession of the theatre, received prestigious rewards and got the recognition of both experts and spectators. Additionally, Kyiv Modern-ballet is the platform for the artistic quest of young Ukrainian choreographers who are ballet dancers at the same time. The latter produced, at different times, one-act ballets The Spectre of the Rose (2014) and The Seasons (2014) by Oleksandr Rodin directed by Oleksiy Busko; The Second Floor to the music of J.Black, N.Frahm and G.Santaolalla directed by Anatoliy Vodzianskiy (2016); Variations of Life to the music of Alfred Schnittke, Henry Purcell, Ólafur Arnalds, S. Anderson and Max Richter, directed by Anna Herus (2017). There are also the productions of Anastasiya Kharchenko, Olena Dolgikh, Olersandr Manshylin, Volodymyr Mitiev, Viktoria Tolstova, Ruslan Baranov, Petro Naku, Vladyslav Detiuchenko and Kateryna Kurman.

The repertoire of the Theatre comprises one-act ballets produced by its leading performer Artem Shoshin Closer than Love to the music of Johann Pachelbel, George Frideric Handel, Christoph Willibald Gluck, Antonio Vivaldi, Ezio Bosso, Alessandro Marcello (2015), Running Through Life to the music of Johann Sebastian Bach, Wim Mertens, Max Richter (2016), Lovebirds to the music of Gustav Mahler and Giacomo Puccini (2019) and the mono-ballet of the leading dancer of the Theatre Illia Myroshnychenko A Tree Cannot Run Away to the music of Pēteris Vasks, John Cage and Eliseo Grenet. llia Myroshnychenko and Kateryna Kuznetsova together produced the anti-utopian ballet 1984. Different to the music of Hildur Guðnadóttir and Hauschka based on George Orwell's novel Nineteen Eighty-Four (2020).

The repertoire includes the divertissements of modern choreography (Con tutti i strumenti) in which Radu Poklitaru's experimental miniatures and the début choreographic productions of the company members are performed; this contributes to the high reputation of Kyiv Modern-ballet as a leading centre for the development of modern choreography in Ukraine.

== Tours and festivals ==
Since the first days of its existence Kyiv Modern-ballet has actively participated in various festivals and contests both in Ukraine and abroad. The Theatre is a permanent participant of the biggest theatrical festivals: Time to Love Dances (Biarritz, France), Bienala Teatrului «Eugène Ionesco» – BITEI, the International Festival of Culture and Dancing (Bangkok, Thailand), the International Theatre Festival FITO (Oradea, Romania), the International Festival The Ballet Summer in Bolshoi (Minsk, Belarus), the International Festival of Modern Choreography in Vitebsk (IFMC) (Vitebsk, Belarus), The International Festival-Contest of Choreographic Art (Łódź, Poland). The Theatre does not only go on tour to cities and towns of Ukraine, it is frequently invited for active collaboration by foreign representative agencies (for over nine years, the Theatre has collaborated with MTSM.B.V Music Theatre Stage Management owing to whose assistance the KMB productions are presented in the countries of Benelux).

Throughout the years of its existence the Theatre has represented Ukraine's art on tours in France, Spain, Switzerland, Netherlands, Belgium, Portugal, Romania, China, Thailand, Russia, Belarus, Moldova, Estonia, South Korea, etc.

The tour schedule of 2019 only included Odesa, Kharkiv, Mykolaiv, Kherson, Poltava, Sumy, Vinnytsia, Khmelnytskyi, Berdiansk, Mariupol, Kramatorsk, Sievierodonetsk, Dnipro, Kryvyi Rih, Zaporizhzhia, Cherkasy. The Theatre showed its productions on the stages of Salle Métropole (Lausanne), Théâtre du Léman (Geneva), Theater de Korenbeurs (Franeker), Theater Veluvine (Nunspeet), Theater Singer (Laren), Theater De Hofnar (Valkenswaard), Theater Voorhuys (Berstadt), Cultuur-En Congrescentrum Van (Veendam), Schouwburg (Lochem), ZINiN (Nijverdal), Cultura Ede (Molenstraat), Posthuis Theater (Heerenveen), Stadsgehoorzaal (Кampen).

The Theatre participates in the traditional festival The Summer in Art Nouveau Style which is held in Odesa on the stage of the Odesa Opera and Ballet Theater. The first festival was organized in 2016 for the Theatre's tenth anniversary, the seventh took place in 2021.

The Kyiv Modern-ballet Theatre answered the lockdown restrictions of the pandemic period with the online production of The Little Prince, the first performance of which on October 21, 2020 was watched by over 17 thousand people. On New Year Eve, December 31, 2020, the Theatre presented the online version of the ballet The Nutcracker, which was broadcast from the October Palace in Kyiv.

== People of the theatre ==
Management

- Radu Poklitaru – the founder and chief ballet master
- Volodymyr Melenchukov – executive and art director (since January 2018)

Choreographers

- Vladyslav Detiuchenko
- Kateryna Kurman
- Illia Miroshnychenko
- Artem Shoshin

Performers

Leading performers

- Anastasiia Baird (since 2020)
- Mishel Fondiu (since 2009)
- Dmytro Kondratiuk (since 2006)
- Kateryna Kurman (since 2008)

Soloists

- Polina Hrinina
- Sofiia Huseva
- Oleksandr Pavluchenko
- Serhii Shcherbinenko
- Kseniia Yakushenko

Performers

- Hennadii Baronin
- Yuliia Chovhan
- Hanna Karnaukh
- Tetiana Kuruohlu
- Artem Kuruohlu
- Polina Lukanska
- Nikita Shershnov
- Daria Shynkaruk
- Oleksandra Stoliar
- Anatolii Vodzianskyi
- Ivan Zaiets
- Dmytro Zavada

In collaboration with the Theatre
Composers

- Vladimir Nikolayev
- Oleksandr Rodin
- Myroslav Skoryk

== Repertoire ==
- Opera-ballet «Le forze del destino» to the music of Giuseppe Verdi, Arrigo Boito, Giacomo Puccini, Camille Saint-Saëns, Alfredo Catalani (Radu Poklitaru), 2005
- Two-part ballet Carmen.TV to the music of Georges Bizet (Radu Poklitaru), 2006
- Two-act ballet Romeo and Juliet (Shakespeareriments) to the music of Pyotr Tchaikovsky, George Handel and the Renaissance music, based on Shakespeare's plays (Radu Poklitaru), 2007
- One-act ballet Rain to the music of Johann Sebastian Bach and folk music of the world (Radu Poklitaru), 2007
- One-act ballet Boléro of Maurice Ravel (Radu Poklitaru), 2007
- Two-act ballet The Nutcracker of Pyotr Tchaikovsky (Radu Poklitaru), 2007
- One-act ballet Underground to the music of Pēteris Vasks (Radu Poklitaru), 2008
- One-act ballet Ward No. 6 to the music of Arvo Pärt (Radu Poklitaru), 2008
- One-act ballet Two for the Seesaw to the music of Johann Sebastian Bach and Chavela Vargas based on William Gibson's play of the same name (Radu Poklitaru), 2009
- One-act ballet Quartet-à-tête to the music of Ad Maas (Radu Poklitaru), 2010
- Divertissement of modern choreography Con tutti i strumenti (Radu Poklitaru and the performers of the company), 2010
- One-act ballet In pivo veritas to the Celtic folk music and the Renaissance music (Radu Poklitaru), 2011
- The ballet-triptych The Intersection to the music of Myroslav Skoryk (Radu Poklitaru. Co-production with the National Opera of Ukraine), 2012
- One-act ballet Hereven to the music of Volodymyr Nikolaiev (Radu Poklitaru. Co-production with the Perm Opera and Ballet Theatre), 2012
- Two-act ballet Swan Lake of Pyotr Tchaikovsky (Radu Poklitaru), 2013
- One-act ballet Seasons by Oleksandr Rodin (Oleksiy Busko), 2013
- One-act ballet Women in D-Moll to the music of Johann Sebastian Bach (Radu Poklitaru), 2014
- One-act ballet The Spectre of the Rose to the original music of Oleksandr Rodin, a re-interpretation of Michel Fokine's ballet Le Spectre de la rose to the music of Carl Maria von Weber produced in 1911 and based on the poem Le Spectre de la Rose by Théophile Gautier (Oleksiy Busko), 2014
- One-act ballet The Long Christmas Dinner to the music of Antonio Vivaldi, based on Thornton Wilder's play (Radu Poklitaru), 2014
- One-act ballet Closer than Love to the music of Johann Pachelbel, George Frideric Handel, Christoph Willibald Gluck, Antonio Vivaldi, Ezio Bosso, Alessandro Marcello (Artem Shoshin), 2015
- One-act ballet Running Through Life to the music of Johann Sebastian Bach, Wim Mertens, Max Richter (Artem Shoshin), 2016
- Two-act ballet Giselle of Adolphe Adam (Radu Poklitaru), 2016 (The project was carried out with the support of the patron of arts Ludmyla Rusalina. Sponsor General: STATUS)
- One-act ballet Up the River to the music of Oleksandr Rodin, based on F. Scott Fitzgerald's The Curious Case of Benjamin Button (Radu Poklitaru), 2017
- Two-act ballet The Sleeping Beauty of Pyotr Tchaikovsky, based on the fairy-tale by Giambattista Basile (Radu Poklitaru), 2018 (The project was carried out with the support of the Embassy of Switzerland in Ukraine)
- Monoballet A Tree Cannot Run Away to the music of Pēteris Vasks, John Cage, Eliseo Grenet (Illia Miroshnichenko), 2018
- One-act ballet Lovebirds to the music of Gustav Mahler and Giacomo Puccini (Artem Shoshin), 2019
- Two-act ballet Viy of Oleksandr Rodin, based on Mykola Gogol's of the same name (Radu Poklitaru), 2019 (The project was carried out with the support of the Department of Culture of the Kyiv City State Administration)
- Anti-utopia ballet 1984. Different to the music of Hildur Guðnadóttir and Hauschka based on George Orwell's novel Nineteen Eighty-Four (Illia Miroshnichenko, Kateryna Kuznetsova), 2020
- Two-act ballet The Little Prince to the music of Wolfgang Amadeus Mozart and Ukrainian lullabies performed by Maria Pylypchak, based on the tale by Antoine de Saint-Exupéry (Radu Poklitaru), 2020 (The project was carried out with the support of the Ukrainian Cultural Foundation and the Department of Culture of the Kyiv City State Administration)
- One-act ballet Nine Rendezvous to the music of Frédéric Chopin (Radu Poklitaru), 2021 (The project was carried out with the support of the patron of arts Volodymyr Filippov)
- Two-act ballet The Queen of Spades to the music of Pyotr Tchaikovsky (the Second and Sixth Symphonies) based on Alexander Pushkin's short novel of the same name (Radu Poklitaru), 2021 (The project was carried out with the support of the Ukrainian Cultural Foundation and the Department of Culture of the Kyiv City State Administration)
- One-act ballet Tomorrow to the music of Frédéric Chopin (Radu Poklitaru), 2023
- One-act ballet DiscrimiNATION to the music of George Frideric Handel and Valentyn Silvestrov (Radu Poklitaru), 2023 (The project was carried out with the support of the Ukrainian Cultural Foundation)
- One-act ballet One Minute Before Christmas to the music of Camille Saint-Saëns and Carol of the Bells (Serhii Kon), 2023

== Awards and acknowledgement ==
| Year | Prize | Nomination | Nominee | Result |
|---|---|---|---|---|
| 2007 | The Kyiv Pectoral theatrical prize of the 2006/07 | The best production of the drama theatre | Carmen.TV | Won |
| 2007 | The Kyiv Pectoral theatrical prize of the 2006/07 | The best choreography and plastic arts / plastic interpretation of a production | Radu Poklitaru (Carmen.TV) | Won |
| 2007 | The Kyiv Pectoral theatrical prize of the 2006/07 | The best performance of a female part | Olga Kondakova (Carmen in the ballet Carmen.TV) | Nominated |
| 2008 | The Kyiv Pectoral theatrical prize of the 2007/08 | The Event of the Year | Bolero; Rain; The Verona Myth: Shakespearements; The Nutcracker | Won |
| 2013 | The Kyiv Pectoral theatrical prize of the 2012/13 | The artistic event at a musical theatre / The best production of a musical theatre | The Intersection | Won |
| 2014 | The Kyiv Pectoral theatrical prize of the 2013/14 | The artistic event at a musical theatre / The best production of a musical theatre | Swan Lake | Won |
| 2014 | The Kyiv Pectoral theatrical prize of the 2013/14 | The best choreography and plastic arts / plastic interpretation of a production | Radu Poklitaru (Swan Lake) | Won |
| 2014 | The Kyiv Pectoral theatrical prize of the 2013/14 | The best stage directing début | Oleksiy Busko (Seasons) | Nominated |
| 2016 | Shevchenko National Prize of Ukraine | Musical Art | Swan Lake; Women in D-Moll; The Long Christmas Dinner; The Intersection | Won |
| 2019 | GRA; II All-Ukrainian Theatrical Festival-Prize | The best choreographic/ballet/plastic production | The Sleeping Beauty | Nominated |
| 2020 | The Kyiv Pectoral theatrical prize of the 2019/20 | The best stage directing | Radu Poklitaru (Viy) | Nominated |
| 2020 | The Kyiv Pectoral theatrical prize of the 2019/20 | The best performance of a male part | Illia Miroshnychenko (Khoma Brutus in the ballet Viy) | Nominated |
| 2020 | The Kyiv Pectoral theatrical prize of the 2019/20 | The best musical conception of a production | Оleksandr Rodin (Viy) | Nominated |
| 2020 | The Kyiv Pectoral theatrical prize of the 2019/20 | The best plastic interpretation of a production | Radu Poklitaru (Viy) | Won |

== Literature ==
- Елена Узун. Свободный танец Раду Поклитару. / Elena Uzun. The Free Dance of Radu Poklitaru. — Chișinău: «Elan INC» (типографія «Elan Poligraf»), 2012. — 158 p. — ISBN 978-9975-4251-2-4
