= Vladyslav Gorai =

Ukrainian operatic tenor (1965–2025)

- Владислав Горай
- Vladyslav Gorai, c. 2005
- Born: 5 August 1967; Malyn, Zhytomyr Oblast, Ukrainian SSR
- Died: 8 June 2025 (aged 57); Sumy Oblast, Ukraine
- Education: Vinnytsia State Pedagogical University; Odesa Conservatory
- Occupation: Operatic tenor
- Organizations: Odesa Opera and Ballet Theatre
- Awards: Merited Artist of Ukraine

Vladyslav Vikentiiovych Gorai or Horay (Ukrainian: Владислав Вікентійович Горай; 5 August 1967 – 8 June 2025) was a Ukrainian operatic tenor. Based at the Odesa Opera and Ballet Theatre, he appeared internationally. He portrayed the Duke in Verdi's Rigoletto and Rodolfo in Puccini's La bohème, but also performed contemporary opera such as the world premiere of Oleksandr Rodin's Kateryna in Odesa in September 2022.

== Life and career ==
Vladyslav Gorai was born on 5 August 1967 in Malyn, Zhytomyr Oblast, into a family of professional musicians. He grew up with a younger brother. He learned to play the piano at the Children's School of Arts and attended the Lyceum No. 3 in Malyn. In 1988, he graduated with honors from the faculty of music and pedagogy of the Mykhailo Kotsiubynskyi Vinnytsia State Pedagogical Institute in piano, voice and conducting. He then studied further at the Odesa Conservatory with Mykola Ohrenych.

In 1993, he became a soloist with the opera company of the Odesa Opera and Ballet Theatre, first as a baritone, but changing to a tenor. He performed more than fifty roles including lead roles such as Count Almaviva in Rossini's The Barber of Seville, Edgardo in Donizetti's Lucia di Lammermoor, Verdi's Duke in Rigoletto and Alfredo in La traviata, and Rodolfo in Puccini's La bohème. He performed with "impeccable voice control and a deep understanding of the lyrics and character of the roles". From 2000 to 2003, he worked at the State Theater of Opera and Ballet in Constanța (Romania). He took part in the world premiere of Oleksandr Rodin's Kateryna on 17 September 2022, portraying the Lirnyk. The premiere, scheduled for March 2022, had to be postponed due to attacks which caused the necessity to build a bomb shelter. Gorai said when preparing the premiere that performing was good for both the musicians and the audience, and expressed: ""This pain that's settled in our souls is made up of energy that just tortures us. And thank God there's a way for us to recycle that energy into art — otherwise it would eat us from the inside."

Gorai appeared internationally, at the Teatro Monumental in Madrid in 2002, as the Duke in Rigoletto at the Teatro Politeama, Lecce in 2016, at the Paris Opera, the Accademia di Musica in Rome, the Opéra National de Lyon, the Strasbourg Opera House, the Zurich Opera House, and the Romanian National Opera, Bucharest. He performed in Amsterdam, at the Royal Albert Hall in London, in Brussels, Lisbon, Chișinău and Almaty, among others. In 2014 and again in 2024, he appeared in Boca Raton, Florida, to recreate, with Felix Livshitz, Alexander Gunko and the Spanish River Orchestra, repertoire of the Three Jerusalem Tenors of Yiddish and crossover music. The three tenors also toured Canada, Italy, Macau and Israel.

=== Personal life and death ===
Gorai was married; the couple had two sons.

With the large-scale Russian invasion, his wife and the small children left the city, and he and a friend from the orchestra wanted to enlist in the Armed Forces of Ukraine. They were told that there were not enough guns. Gorai joined a volunteer organisation and worked as a driver, transporting people and goods such as camouflage nets and humanitarian aid. He performed at charity concerts in Ukraine and abroad, and creating charitable performances; he donated the funds raised to the Armed Forces. Initial reports indicated that Gorai had died on 8 June 2025 while attempting to rescue civilians during a volunteer relief mission in Sumy Oblast at a time of heavy fighting, including missile and drone attacks, in the Russo-Ukrainian War. Suspilne, the national public broadcaster of Ukraine, later reported that Gorai had died while volunteering to deliver materiel to the front lines in support of the armed forces. Soloist Dmytro Pavlyuk, Gorai's friend and colleague, told Suspilne that Gorai had been quietly volunteering since the beginning of the war. In noting his death, Deutschlandradio said Gorai was considered one of the best opera singers in Ukraine.

On 12 June 2025, Gorai was bid farewell at the Odesa Opera House to applause and cries of "Bravo". The following day he was honoured at the Malyn City Centre for Culture and Leisure, where he first performed the Malyn Anthem. Gorai was buried in Riznia, Korosten Raion.

== Awards ==
- Merited Artist of Ukraine (27 March 2013)
- Prize at the National Chamber Music Competition in Khmelnytskyi
- Prize at the Antonín Dvořák International Vocal Competition (Karlovy Vary, Czech Republic)
