= Oleksandr Rodin =

Ukrainian artist (born 1975)

- Олександр Леонідович Родін; Аляксандр Леанідавіч Родзін
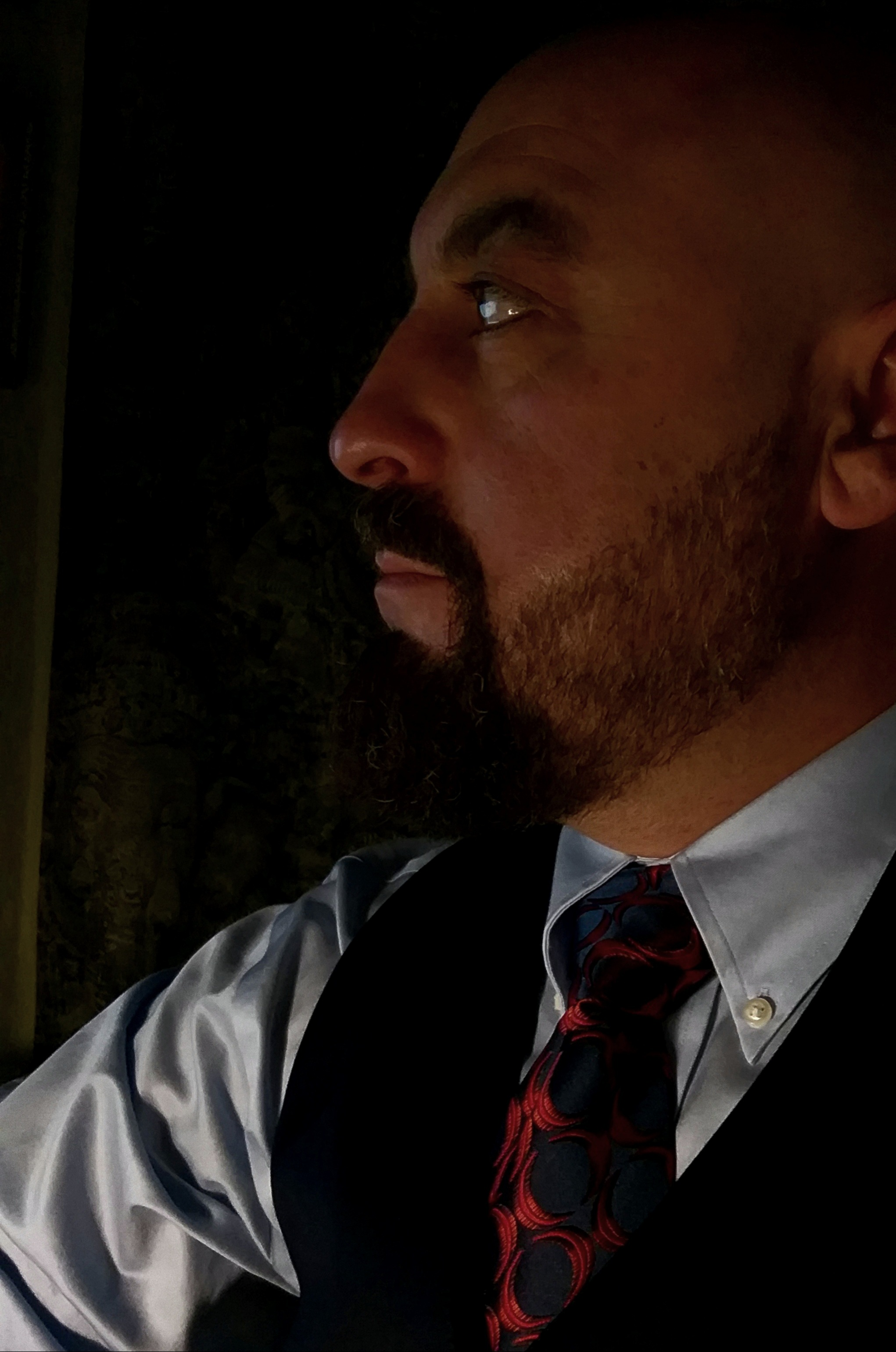
- Rodin in 2021
- Born: 2 January 1975 (age 51); Paddabranka, Gomel Oblast, Belarusian SSR, USSR (now Belarus)
- Education: Chernihiv Levko Revutskyi Music College; Odesa Conservatory
- Occupations: Composer; Pianist; Painter
- Awards: Merited Person of Arts of Ukraine; Mykola Leontovych Prize

Oleksandr Leonidovich Rodin (Ukrainian: Олександр Леонідович Родін, Belarusian: Аляксандр Леанідавіч Родзін, romanized: Alyaksandr Leanidavich Rodzin; born 2 January 1975) is a Ukrainian composer, pianist and painter. He is a member of the National Union of Composers of Ukraine. His works of many genres have been performed internationally. His ballets were created in collaboration with the Kyiv Municipal Academic Opera and Ballet Theatre and the Ukrainian contemporary dance theater Kyiv Modern-Ballet. His opera Kateryna, for which he wrote the libretto based on a poem by Taras Shevchenko, was premiered by the Odesa Opera and Ballet Theatre in 2022.

== Biography ==
Rodin was born on 2 January 1975, in Paddabranka (now Belarus). He gained first experience in composition at the music college in Chernihiv, where he wrote music for a stage performance. In 1994, he graduated from the Chernihiv Levko Revutskyi Music School with a degree in piano, and in 2001, he graduated from the Odesa Conservatory, with another degree in piano.

Rodin is mostly self-taught as a composer. He lives and works in Kyiv. From 2005 he has been a member of the National Union of Composers of Ukraine. He was their composer in residence in the 2020/21 season.

== Works ==
Rodin mastered composition himself, but became one of the young Ukrainian composers whose works are regularly performed on stages both in Ukraine and abroad. He has created music in various genres, including symphonic works, choral compositions, chamber and instrumental music, as well as ballets and operas. His works have been performed in Canada, Japan, the United States, and in Europe. He became the first among contemporary Ukrainian composers whose works were included in the repertoires of European theatres. Rodin has made many adaptations of Ukrainian folk songs, updated classical works, and scored dramatic performances, films, and television series.

Rodin's style has been described as neo-academic. He combines classical rules with contemporary musical elements of the 21st century. His works intertwine pure harmony with dissonance, lyrical episodes with dramatic ones, melodiousness with elements of randomness, as well as features of Impressionism and Expressionism.

Rodin's ballets were created in collaboration with the Kyiv Municipal Academic Opera and Ballet Theatre and the Ukrainian contemporary dance theater Kyiv Modern-Ballet. His ballet Soliaris (2021), based on Stanisław Lem, was premiered in 2025 at the Lviv National Opera).

Rodin's opera Kateryna, for which he wrote the libretto based on a poem by Taras Shevchenko, was premiered in 2022 by the Odesa Opera and Ballet Theatre. The theatre received the International Opera Awards 2022 in the category "best opera house" for the work The opera was nominated for the Shevchenko National Prize

Among his important works are:

- Stage works
  - Kateryna, opera based on the works of Taras Shevchenko (2022)
  - Pory Roku, ballet (2013)
  - Vydinnia Rozy (Rosa's Vision), ballet (2014)
  - Vhoru po richtsi, ballet (2017)
  - Viy, ballet (2019)
  - Aladdin, ballet (2021)
  - Soliaris, ballet (2021), based on Stanisław Lem
- Vocal works
  - Requiem (in memory of the Holodomor victims) for symphony orchestra, choir, and soloists
  - Stabat Mater, for soprano, mezzo-soprano, and string orchestra
  - Liubov Smert (Love Death), cantata based on poems of Charles Baudelaire for soprano and orchestra
  - Missa Luminosa, for soprano and string orchestra
- Symphonic works
  - Sim ostannikh sliv Isusa na Khresti ("Sviatyi Bozhe")
  - Romantychna
  - Barakholka (The Flea Market), symphonic cycle
  - La follia
  - The Last Seven Words of Jesus on the Cross
- Concertante works
  - Piano Concerto
  - Violin Concerto
  - Viola Concerto
- Chamber orchestra works
  - Knyha Snovydin (Book of Dreams) for strings and percussion
  - Pislia prochytannia Lavkrafta for strings
- Chamber music
  - Shchodennyk samotnosti, premiered in 2024 at the Brooklyn Conservatory of Music

== Awards ==
- Merited Person of Arts of Ukraine (7 November 2024);
- Mykola Leontovych Prize in the category "Professional composers" (2024);
- Twice: laureate of international composer competitions (France)
- Laureate of theatre festival awards for best music for dramatic performances;
- Recipient of the Kyiv City Mayor's scholarship "For personal contribution to the development of the city, high achievements in public life"
