= Anastasia Bezrukova =

Russian model

- Анастасия Безрукова
- Born: Anastasia Dmitrievna Bezrukova; 5 January 2004 (age 21); Moscow, Russia
- Occupations: Model; actress
- Years active: 2015-present
- Height: 176 cm (5 ft 9 in)

Anastasia Dmitrievna Bezrukova (Russian: Анастасия Дмитриевна Безрукова; born 5 January 2004) is a Russian model.

== Biography ==
Anastasia Bezrukova was born in Moscow. At the age of ten, she was one of the most in-demand child models in Europe. Bezrukova had modelled for brands such as Benetton, Pinko, Moschino, and Incanto. She had also been on the cover of Vogue Bambini.

In 2016 she debuted on screen in one of the lead roles in Anna Matison's movie The Milky Way.

Furthermore, in October 2015 Bezrukova joined the cast of another Anna Matison movie, titled After You're Gone. For her role she took dance lessons from choreographer Radu Poklitaru and acting lessons from Moscow's Bolshoi Theatre ballet dancer Yan Godovsky. Again she starred as the daughter of a retired ballet dancer who faces a progressing illness. The scenario was written with Bezrukova in mind, but without knowing that she had practiced rhythmic gymnastics and consequently wouldn't require a stunt double.

She has also starred in a music video for a project titled "Sleeplessness".

== Filmography ==
Year	Title	Original title	Role	Notes
2016	The Milky Way	Млечный путь	Liza Kaygorodova	
2017	After You're Gone	После тебя	Chiara	
