= Kateryna (opera) =

2022 opera by Oleksandr Rodin

- Opera by Oleksandr Rodin
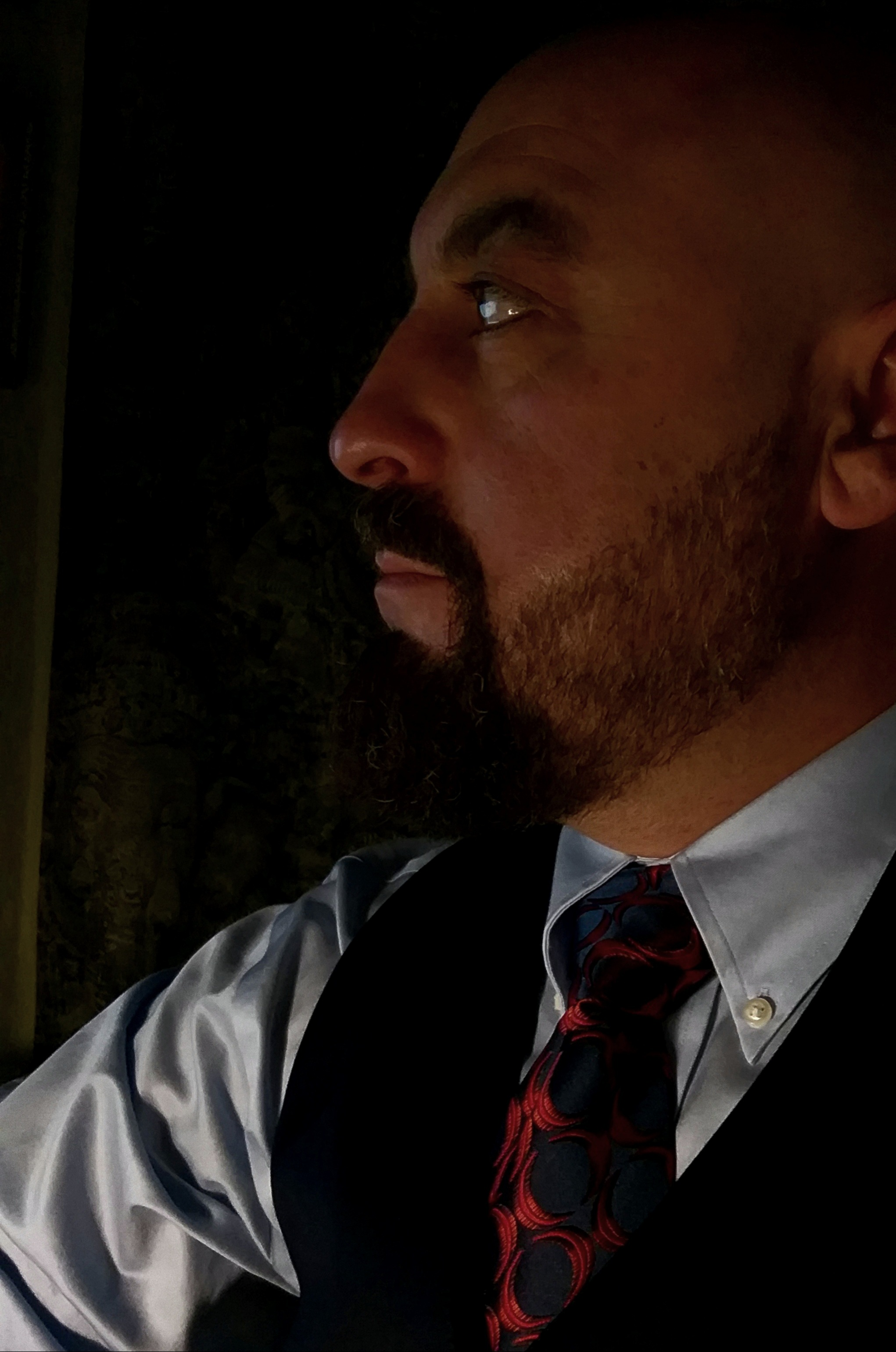
- Rodin, who wrote libretto and music, in 2021
- Librettist: Rodin
- Language: Ukrainian
- Based on: poem by Taras Shevchenko
- Premiere: 2022; Odesa Opera and Ballet Theatre

Kateryna (Ukrainian: Катерина) is a Ukrainian opera in two acts by Oleksandr Rodin based on Taras Shevchenko's 1838 poem of the same name. It premiered on 17 September 2022, at the Odesa Opera and Ballet Theatre in Ukraine.

== History ==
The composer Oleksandr Rodin, born in 1975 in Paddabranka, Belarus, and raised in Chernihiv, Ukraine, composed Kateryna on commission from the Odesa Opera House. The idea for the production came from Nadiia Babych, the general director of the theater, who also took on the overall artistic direction. Rodin himself compiled the libretto. It's based on a short poem of the same name by the Ukrainian poet Taras Shevchenko. According to Rodin, he needed at least half a year for the libretto. Ultimately, he took approximately 85 percent of the text directly from the original work and other texts by Shevchenko, including some Russian words for the role of the Muscovite Ivan. In total, Rodin worked on the opera for three years. It is the largest opera production since Ukraine gained independence. Special musical instruments were designed to imitate natural sounds. The 800 costumes were supposed to be sewn in Kharkiv. However, due to the heavy bombing of that city, production had to be moved to Odesa. In total, approximately 400 participants were involved in the production.

The premiere was originally scheduled for World Theatre Day on 27 March 2022. A month prior, on 24 February 2022, there was supposed to be a public rehearsal for the press. However, due to the Russian invasion of Ukraine three days earlier, this had to be canceled. The opera house was surrounded by barricades for a period of three months until a limited operation could resume in mid-June. The premiere of Kateryna finally took place on 17 September 2022, in the presence of the then Ukrainian Minister of Culture and Information Policy of Ukraine, Oleksandr Tkachenko. The musical direction was by Viacheslav Chernukha-Volych. The staging was directed by Oksana Taranenko, the scenic concept was by Dmytro Tsyperdiuk, set and costume design by Ihor Anisenko, choreography by Oleksii Skliarenko, and lighting design by Maksym Diedov. The title role was sung by Yulia Tereshchuk. During the intermission, there was an air raid alarm for fifteen minutes. The performance was able to continue afterwards.

The Odesa Opera House was awarded "best opera house" for this production at the 2022 International Opera Awards. In February 2023, Arte made a recording of the premiere production available as a video stream online. With this work, Arte showed for the first time a production from a house that was not a regular partner of the season.

== Roles ==
Roles, voice types, premier cast
Role	Voice type	Premiere cast, 17 September 2022, Odesa Conductor: Viacheslav Chernukha-Volych
Kateryna	soprano	Yulia Tereshchuk
Ivan	tenor	Oleksander Prokopovych
Father	bass	Dmytro Pavliuk
Mother	mezzo-soprano	Tetiana Spaska
Lyre player	tenor	Vladyslav Gorai
The Witch	soprano	Alina Vorokh
Shinkarka	mezzo-soprano	Anastasiya Martyniuk
The Devil	baritone	Vasyl Dobrovolskiy
The Gypsy	baritone	Vasyl Dobrovolskiy
Three Vesnianka girls		Natalia Kadantseva, Iryna Kamenetska, Tetyana Mulyar
Woman at the market		Margarita Krasovskaya
Man at the market		Vitaliy Galko
Death	(dancer)	Roman Lobkin
The Angel	(violinist)	Kateryna Goldshtein

== Plot ==
A fundamental idea of the poem and the opera is the change passing of years as represented by folkloric rites. The chorus has great significance in the opera's audience. The actual plot is told by the seventeen figures of the traditional Eastern European Vertep Christmas play – Death, Devil, Witch, Wizard, Gypsy, Schynkarka, Angel, Grinch, God, Giant, Genie, Tattletale, Prince, King, Princess, Queen and Lyre Player.

== Recordings ==
External videos
- Alexander Rodin – Opera Kateryna (recording of the opera) on YouTube, 26 February 2024

- October 2022 – Viacheslav Chernukha-Volych (conductor), Oksana Taranenko (director), Dmytro Tsyperdiuk (scenic concept), Ihor Anisenko (set and costume design), Oleksii Skliarenko (choreography), Maksym Diedov (lighting), chorus, ballet and orchestra of the Odesa Opera, children's choir "Pearls of Odesa". Cast: Yuliia Tereshchuk (Kateryna), Oleksandr Prokopovych (Ivan), Dmytro Pavliuk (Father), Olena Starodubtseva (Mother), Vladyslav Gorai (Lyre Player), Alina Tkachuk (Witch), Kateryna Tsymbaliuk (Schynkarka), Denys Daniil Bohatshov (Devil), Yurii Dudar (Gypsy), Yuliia Subotina, Yuliia Tymakova, and Iryna Kamenetska (Vesnianka Girls), Marharyta Krasovskaya (Woman in the Market), Vitalii Halko (Man in the Market), Kristian Nikulytsia (Death), Kateryna Koriahina (Angel).
