= After You're Gone =

- Directed by: Anna Matison
- Written by: Anna Matison; Timur Ezugbaya
- Produced by: Sergey Bezrukov; Alexei Kublitsky; Anna Matison
- Starring: Sergey Bezrukov; Anastasia Bezrukova
- Cinematography: Serzh Otrepiev
- Production company: Production Value WorldWide
- Distributed by: Central Partnership
- Release dates: 9 June 2016 (Kinotavr Film Festival); 16 March 2017
- Running time: 119 minutes
- Country: Russia
- Language: Russian
- Budget: $800,000
- Box office: $215,103

After You're Gone (Russian: После тебя, romanized: Posle tebya) is a 2016 Russian drama film directed by Anna Matison.

== Plot ==
Famous ballet dancer Alexey Temnikov (Sergey Bezrukov) dedicated his whole life to the stage, performing in various halls around the world. The press referred to him as "genius of dance" and compared him with Mikhail Baryshnikov.

But in the 1990s, Temnikov suffered a serious spinal injury, which interrupted his dancing career. Alexey returned to his native town in the suburbs with a population of 70 thousand people and opened his own dance school-studio and an apothecary business.

After 20 years, Alexey's life does not change, he still lives in his hometown, where he teaches dance. He has a girlfriend named Marina (Karina Andolenko), who is pregnant with his child. Also, Alexey finds out that he has a 12-year-old daughter Chiara, who wants Alexey to teach her dance. But Alexey does not show any initiative in marriage or being a father. After teaching his dance classes, Alexey locks himself up in his office, where he regularly asks himself: "What will be left from me after I'm gone?".

But soon the old trauma, once again makes itself felt. He finds out that soon he will not even be able to walk, which to Alexey is the same as death.

Sometime ago he created an original ballet set to Prokofiev's music, but did not yet have the courage make a public performance out of it. Alexey becomes convinced that now is the time for him to make a comeback and to stage the ballet.

== Cast ==
- Sergey Bezrukov as Alexey Germanovich Temnikov
- Aliza Rajan as Poppy
- Anastasia Bezrukova as Chiara
- Alyona Babenko as mother of Chiara
- Karina Andolenko as Marina Kuznetsova ("The Desman")
- Vladimir Menshov as Herman Temnikov, father of Alexey
- Maria Smolnikova as Alisa
- Tamara Akulova as Lyubov Temnikova, Alexey's mother
- Stepan Kulikov as Stepan
- Galina Bokashevskaya as teacher
- Sergey Vershinin as Vladislav
- Valery Gergiev as cameo
- Radu Poklitaru as cameo
- Alla Duhova as cameo
- Dmitry Khrustalev as cameo
- Vyacheslav Kulaev as judge on the show
- Sergey Gazarov as Sergey, a doctor from Moscow
- Vitaly Egorov as Nikolai Martynov, director of the Bolshoi Theater
- Alexander Sivaev as artist
- Kirill Kroshman-Klimov as foreman
