= Maria Bieșu National Opera and Ballet Theatre =

Moldovan entertainment venue

Coordinates: 47.0276°N 28.8300°E

- Teatrul Național de Operă și Balet „Maria Bieșu"
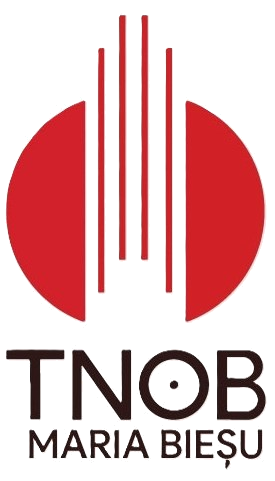

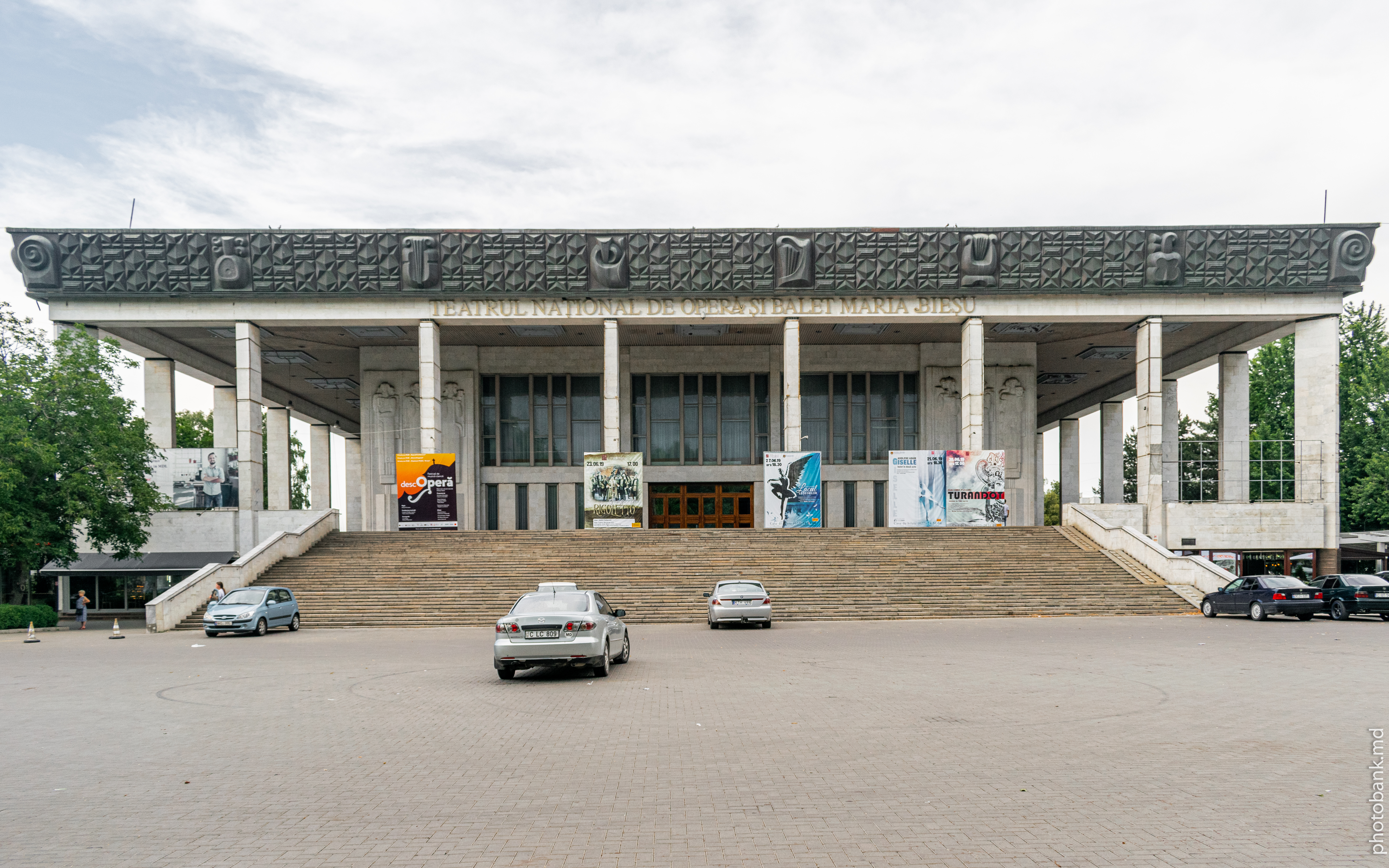
- Interactive map of Maria Bieșu National Opera and Ballet Theatre
- Address: Chișinău; Moldova
- Capacity: 1200
- Current use: live opera, ballet, concerts

Construction
- Opened: 1957
- Rebuilt: 1980

Website
- https://www.tnob.md/ro

The Maria Bieșu National Opera and Ballet Theatre (Romanian: Teatrul Naţional de Operă şi Balet „Maria Bieșu") in Chişinău, Moldova, is one of the leading opera and ballet theatres in Eastern Europe. It is housed in a building on the Boulevard Stefan the Great, one of the main roads in Chişinău. In 2012, it was given the name of the renowned opera singer Maria Bieșu.

== Opera company ==
The Chişinău National Opera, the national opera company of Moldova, was founded in the mid-1940s and became a professional company in 1956. Following the collapse of the USSR, the company is one of the few ex-Soviet opera companies to retain its own orchestra, chorus, soloists and ballet company.

It is housed in the National Opera and Ballet Theatre of Moldova.

== History ==
Built during the years of the Soviet Union, the theatre has superb equipment and facilities. Following the collapse of the Soviet Union, this theatre was one of the few to retain its own ballet, opera and orchestra, with its own soloists and chorus.

=== National Ballet history ===
Professional ballet began in Chişinău in 1957, after a group of Moldovan dancers trained in Leningrad. New works were soon provided for the company: the Moldovan composer Vasile Zagorsky wrote the ballet Rassvet (Sunrise), while another composer Eduard Lazarev wrote Broken Sword, based on the poem "Ghosts", by Mihai Eminescu, a leading Romanian writer.

In its first ten years, the company added many well-known classical ballets to its repertoire, including Giselle, The Sleeping Beauty, Spartacus and Coppelia. It toured to Moscow, Kyiv and Bulgaria. The most successful of the company’s modern ballet productions was A Young Lady and a Hooligan, based on music by Shostakovitch, in which the lead dancer was Mihai Caftanat, who is still working with the company. Born in Chişinău, Caftanat studied ballet in Moscow, returning to his native city to dance Siegfried, Prince Desire, Arald in Broken Sword and Antony in Antony and Cleopatra.

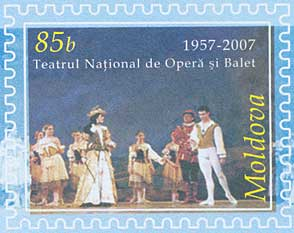
Moldovan 85 bani postage stamp commemorating the company's 50th anniversary in 2007

Other notable productions at this time were: the Carmen Suite; Sonnets, using Benjamin Britten’s music; the Arabesques, with Lazarev’s music. Attempts to create national works included the children’s ballet Andriesh by Zlata Tkach and Luceafarul by Eugen Doga based on Eminescu’s best-known poem; while O Seara de Balet re-introduced audiences to the classical choreography of Marius Petipa, Ivanov, Fokine and Gorski. The Kirov Ballet production of La Bayadère was carefully re-created by Tatiana Leagt and showed how well the company could handle a difficult work requiring first-class performers.

In 1998, the renowned choreographer Yuri Grigorovich from the Bolshoi came to Chişinău to direct his version of The Nutcracker, originally played at the Bolshoi in 1966. The company now toured to Moscow, Vietnam, Bulgaria, Italy, Spain, Germany, the Netherlands, Scandinavia, Romania, Hungary, Greece, Paris, Tokyo, Johannesburg, Los Angeles. In 1999 it brought productions of Swan Lake and Sleeping Beauty to the UK. Since 2001 the company has performed Grigorovich’s Nutcracker several times in the UK. This was the first time the production had been seen in this country since the Bolshoi performed it in London in the early seventies. The Moldova National Ballet has toured regularly in Spain since 2005, in January 2007 it performed The Best of Tchaikovsky in Spain and northern Germany.
