= Kyiv Municipal Academic Opera and Ballet Theatre for Children and Youth =

Theatre in Kyiv

Coordinates: 50°27′55.81″N 30°31′5.25″E

The Kyiv Municipal Academic Opera and Ballet Theatre for Children and Youth (Ukrainian: Київський муніципальний академічний театр опери та балету для дітей та юнацтва) is a theatrical production company in Kyiv, Ukraine. It was founded in 1982 in the premises of the Slavutych Theatre, which was previously called the "Kharchovyk Palace" as during the postwar era it had been assigned for the cultural use of workers in the food industry. Since 2019 the theatre maintains a policy of staging works from the world operatic repertoire in the Ukrainian language

Due to the Russian invasion of Ukraine, the theater was closed from late February until late May 2022.

On May 24, 2026, the theater building was damaged by Russian bombing of Kyiv

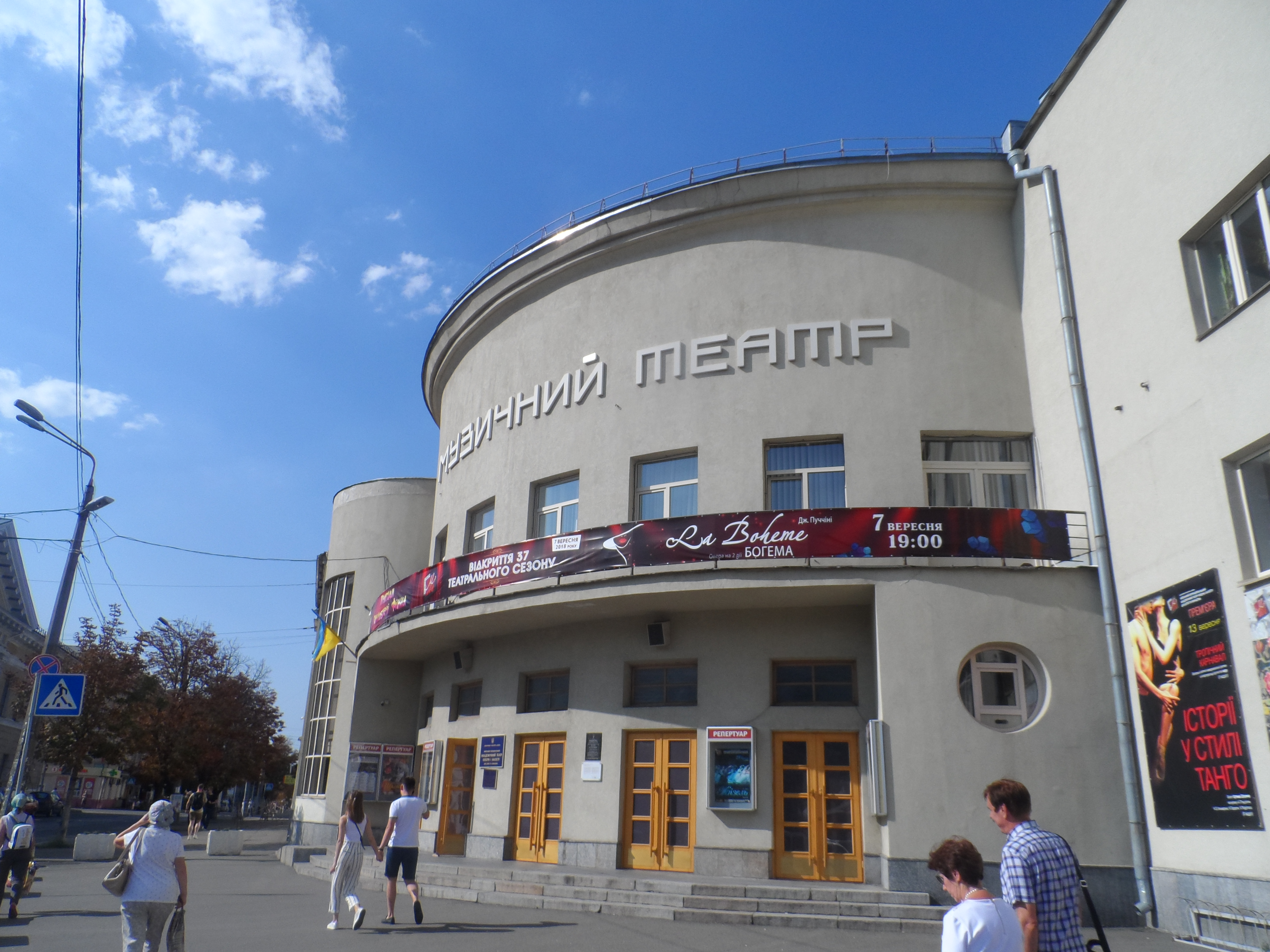
