= Odesa Opera and Ballet Theatre =

19th century theatre in Odesa, Ukraine

Odesa National Academic Opera and Ballet Theatre
- Ukrainian: Одеський національний академічний театр опери та балету
- Logo

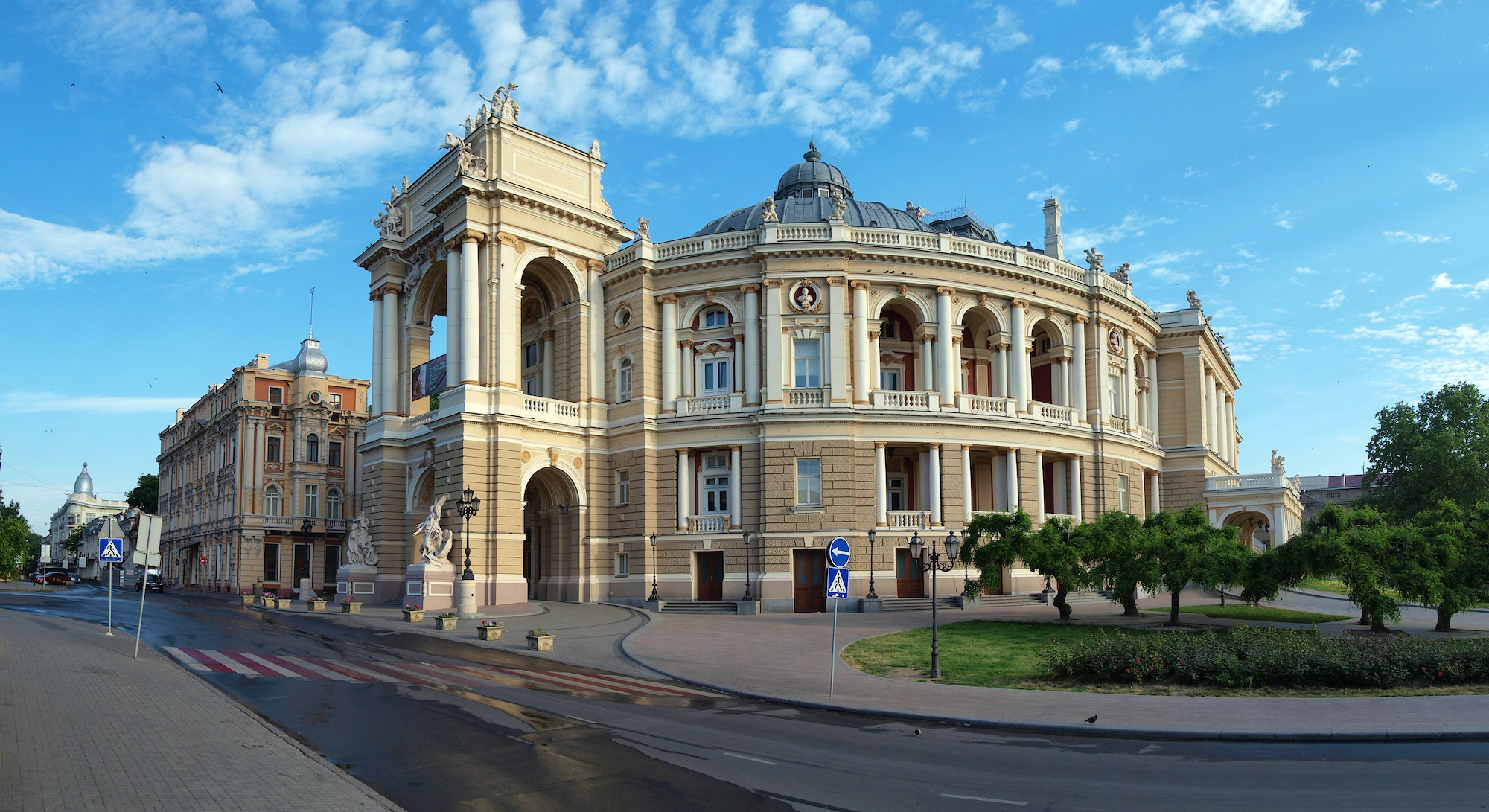
- Odesa Theatre of Opera and Ballet
- Interactive map of Odesa National Academic Opera and Ballet Theatre
- Address: Tchaikovsky Lane 1 Odesa; Ukraine
- Coordinates: 46.485556°N 30.741667°E
- Capacity: 1,636
- Designation: Architectural Landmark

Construction
- Opened: 1810
- Rebuilt: 1887, Fellner & Helmer

Website
- operahouse.od.ua

The Odesa National Academic Opera and Ballet Theatre (Ukrainian: Одеський національний академічний театр опери та балету, romanized: Odeskyi natsionalnyi akademichnyi teatr opery ta baletu) is the oldest theatre in Odesa, Ukraine. The Theatre and the Potemkin Stairs are the most famous edifices in Odesa.

The first opera house was opened in 1810 and destroyed by fire in 1873. The modern building was constructed by Fellner & Helmer in neo-baroque (Vienna Baroque) style and opened in 1887. The architecture of the luxurious audience hall follows the late French rococo style. The unique acoustics of the horseshoe-designed hall allows performers to deliver even a whisper-low tone of voice from the stage to any part of the hall. The most recent renovation of the theatre was completed in 2007.

== History ==
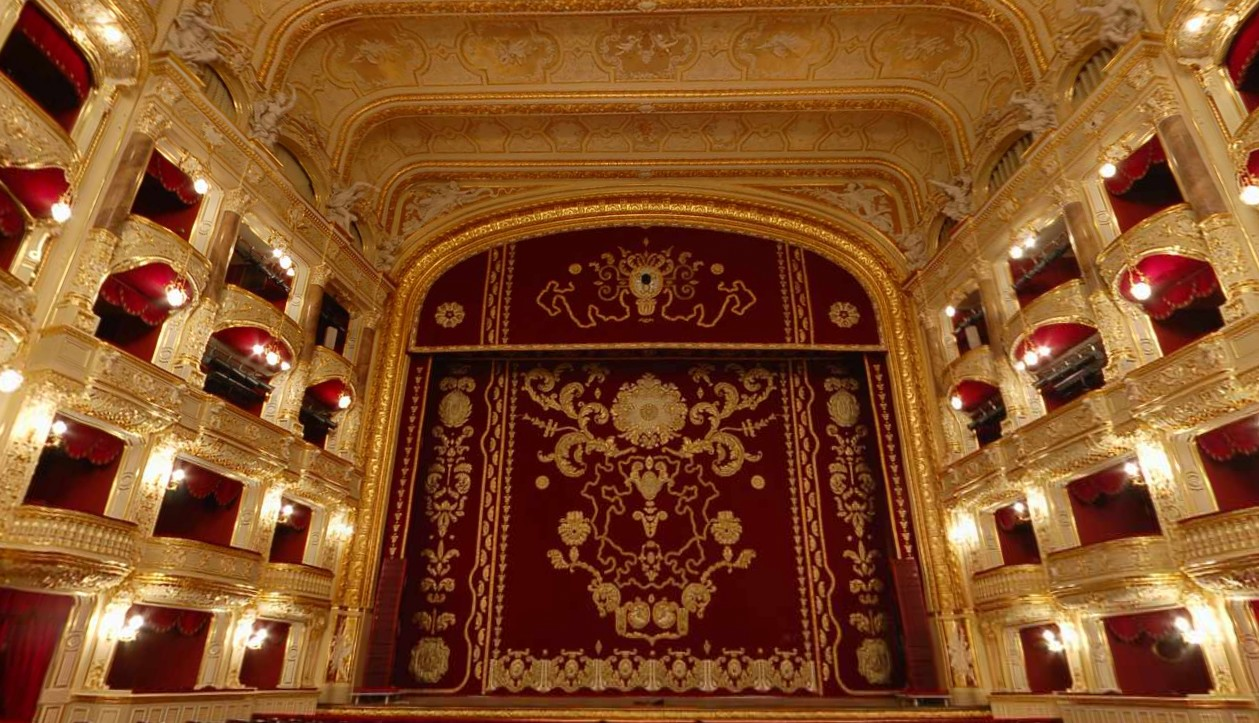
The theatre's main stage.

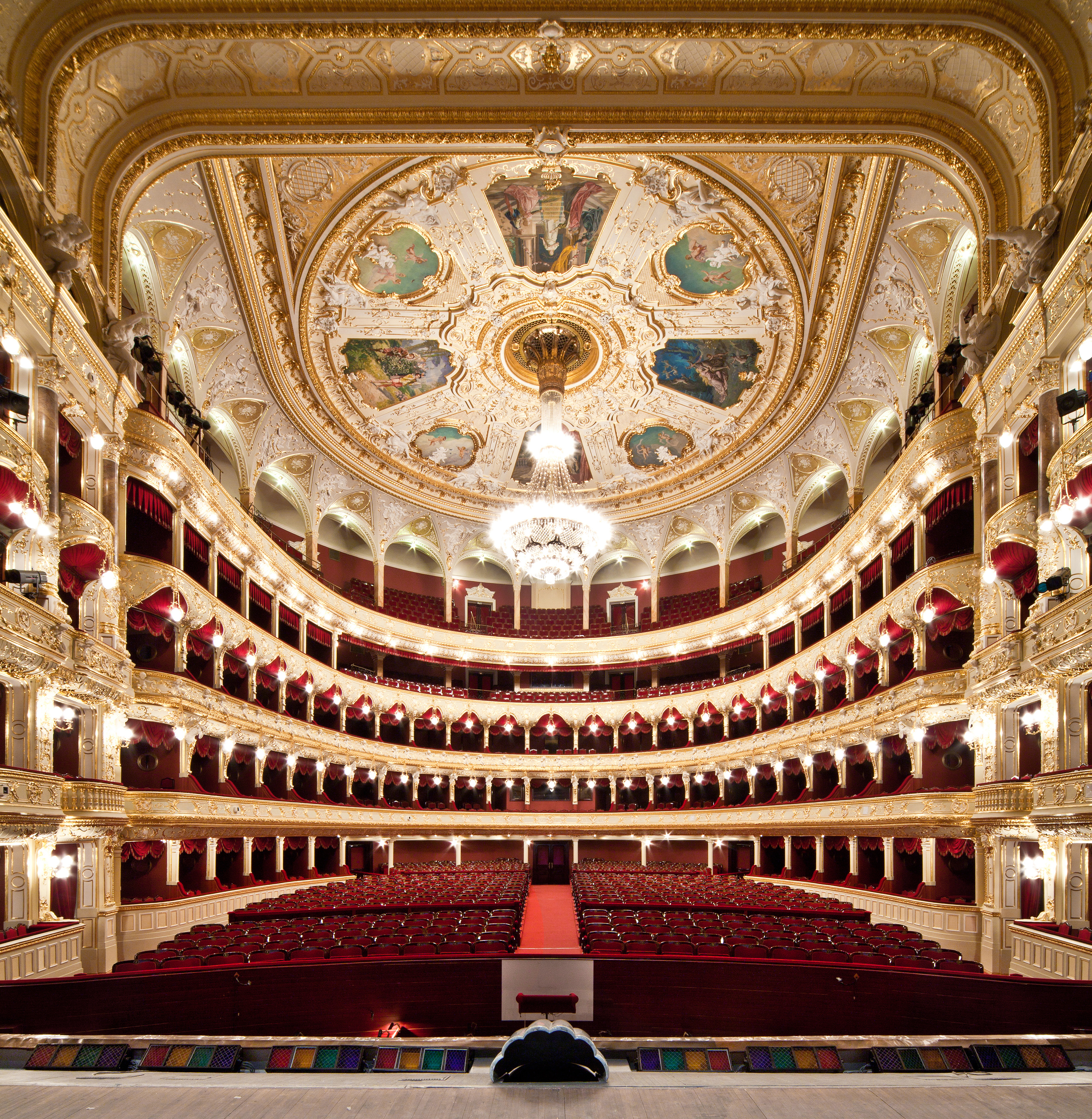
Audience hall of the theatre

Odessa's first theatre (called the City Theatre) was built on the location of the current Odessa Opera and Ballet Theatre and opened on 10 February 1810. The original design, created by the Italian architect Francesco Frapolli, was later modified by the French architect Jean-François Thomas de Thomon who also designed St. Petersburg's Old Stock Exchange. The main entrance with its colonnade faced the sea. There was no foyer.

In 1831, Michael Vorontsov, governor-general of Russian empire, Novorossia kray (currently part of Ukraine) decided to assign the old instituted quarantine fees to the Odessa Theatre. Historian Charles King explains that one of the medical inspectors in Odessa was also the owner of the Odessa Theatre. When ticket sales were low, he would announce the discovery of an infection among newly arrived passengers and ordered them to be quarantined at their own cost. The expenses of the lazaretto, where the passengers stayed, would be used to hire a major performer for the theatre.

On the night of 2 January 1873, the building was gutted by fire.

A fund raising campaign began immediately for the purpose of reconstructing the building. The city announced an international contest for the best theatre design. Forty designs were submitted, but none was chosen. Finally, the project was drafted along the lines of Dresden Semperoper built in 1878, with its nontraditional foyer following the curvatures of auditorium.

Two Viennese architects, Ferdinand Fellner and Hermann Helmer began to construct the larger replacement in 1883. The foundation stone was laid on 16 September 1884. On 1 October 1887, the theatre was completed, costing 1,300,000 rubles to build. It was named the Odessa City Theatre.

The theatre was the first building in Odesa to employ the Edison Company with electric illumination.

To keep theatre patrons comfortable in the summers, workers would lower wagonloads of ice and straw down a 35-foot shaft, then would carry it through a tunnel to a basement beneath the hall, where cool air rose up from vents beneath the seats.

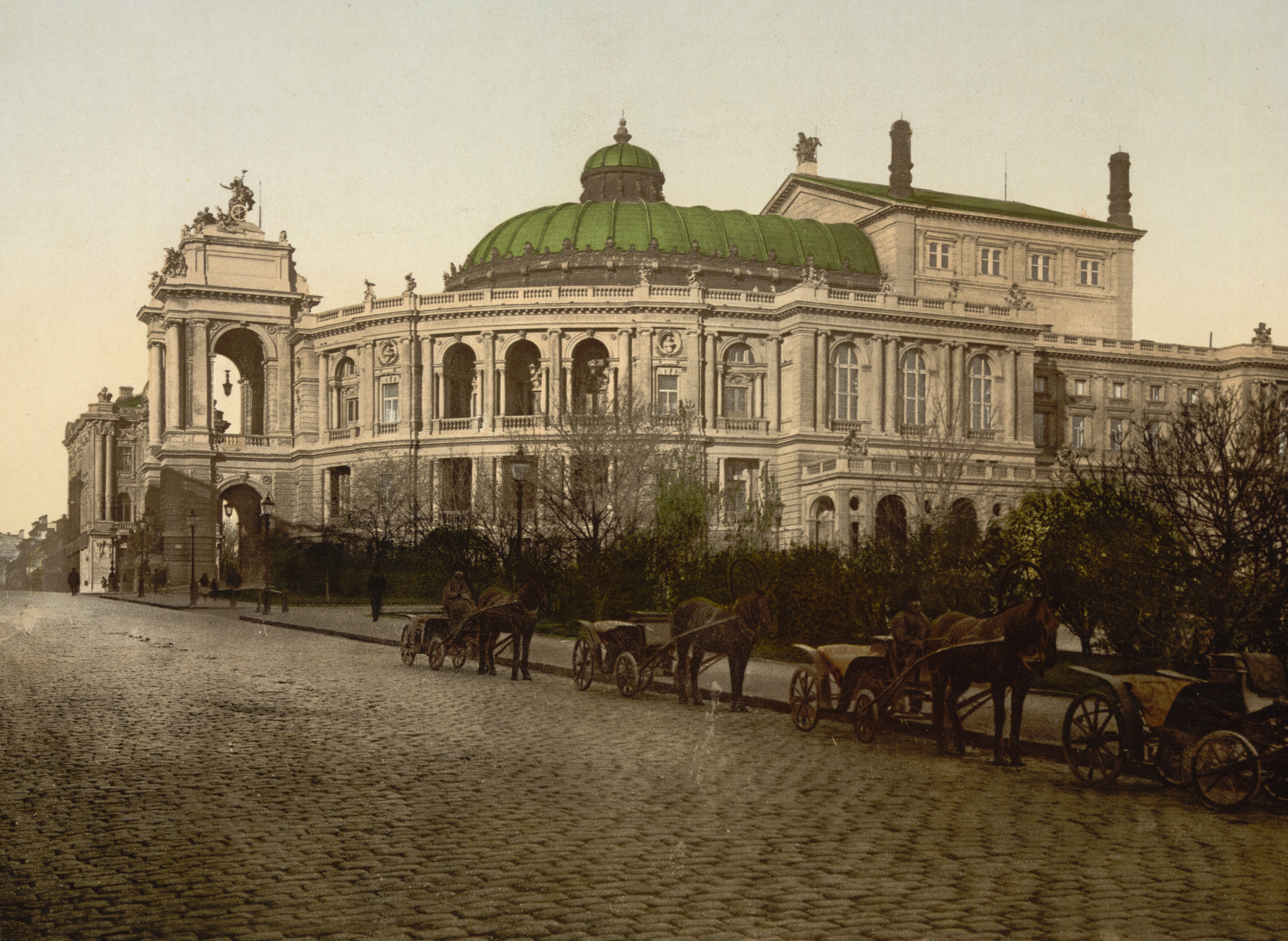
Theatre of Opera and Ballet, 1900

In 1925, the building was burnt again in a fire. A fire team localized the burning, but the stage and orchestra pit were destroyed. During the fire of 1925, the original curtain of the theatre stage burned, which was never restored.

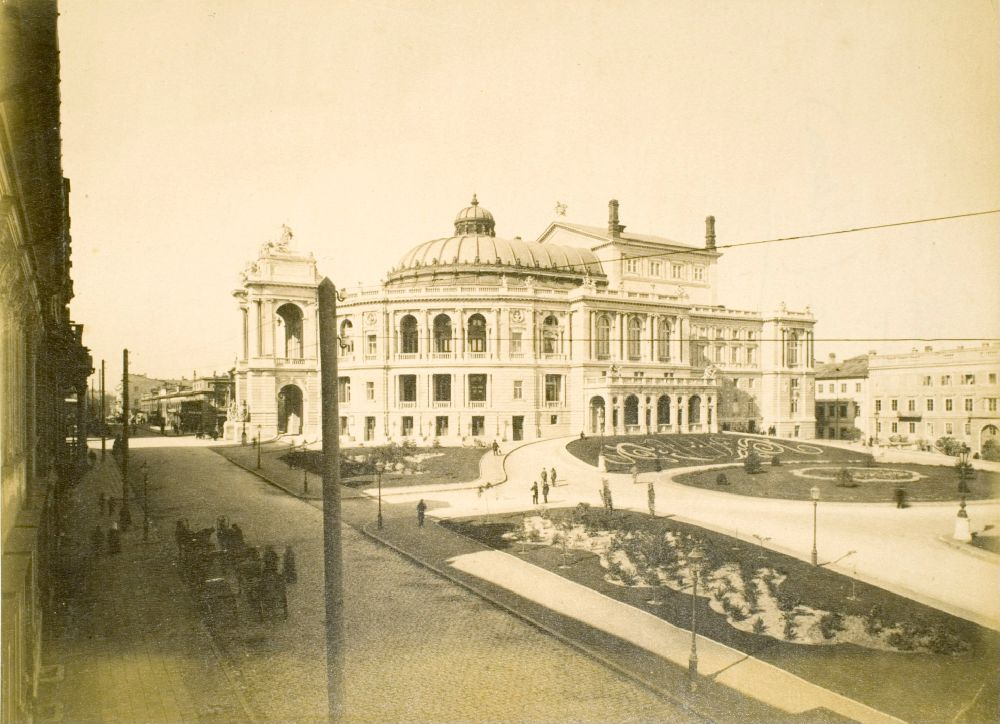
Opera, Odesa, Department of Image Collections National Gallery of Art Library, Washington, DC

There is a story that, when the Odesa people learned that the construction cost 1.3 million gold rubles, they gasped, but when they saw the new theatre, they gasped again, this time in admiration.

In August 1941, when the Romanian army was dangerously close to Odesa, the command of the Odesa defensive area appointed a special anti-aircraft unit, which was given the task of protecting the theatre building from bombing. On the roofs of the houses adjacent to the theatre, guns were installed that shot all 73 days of the city defending. During World War II, Nikita Khrushchev, concerned about the condition of the city, visited Odesa immediately after the German army was ousted from the city. Khrushchev reported that only one corner of the building had been damaged by an enemy shell.

The theatre was remodelled in the 1960s.

The theatre sits upon shifting ground and is in danger of collapse. The first cracks in the foundation appeared almost as soon as the theatre opened. The theatre's eastern half sagged almost seven inches in its first three years, and the six walls began to tilt. Gleb Dranov, a former opera singer who sang at the theatre for 25 years, and who worked five years as a geologist, is helping repair the building.

During the 2022 Russian invasion of Ukraine the theatre used similar defences, including anti-aircraft units and anti-tank hedgehogs, to defend the theatre as had been used during August 1941.

== Construction ==
The building's façade is decorated in the Italian baroque style. In the niches are the busts of Mikhail Glinka, Nikolai Gogol, Alexandr Griboyedov and Alexander Pushkin. The large hall was modelled after the style of Louis XVI, and is richly decorated with gilded stucco figures and designs. The architects provided the foyer with twenty-four exits, to avoid tragedy in the case of a fire. On the side of the theatre is a lawn with fresh flowers and shrubs.

== People ==
The famous Russian singer Feodor Chaliapin gave many concerts at the Odesa Opera. Soprano Lyudmila Shirina was a leading singer from 1975, and later head of the company.

== Gallery ==
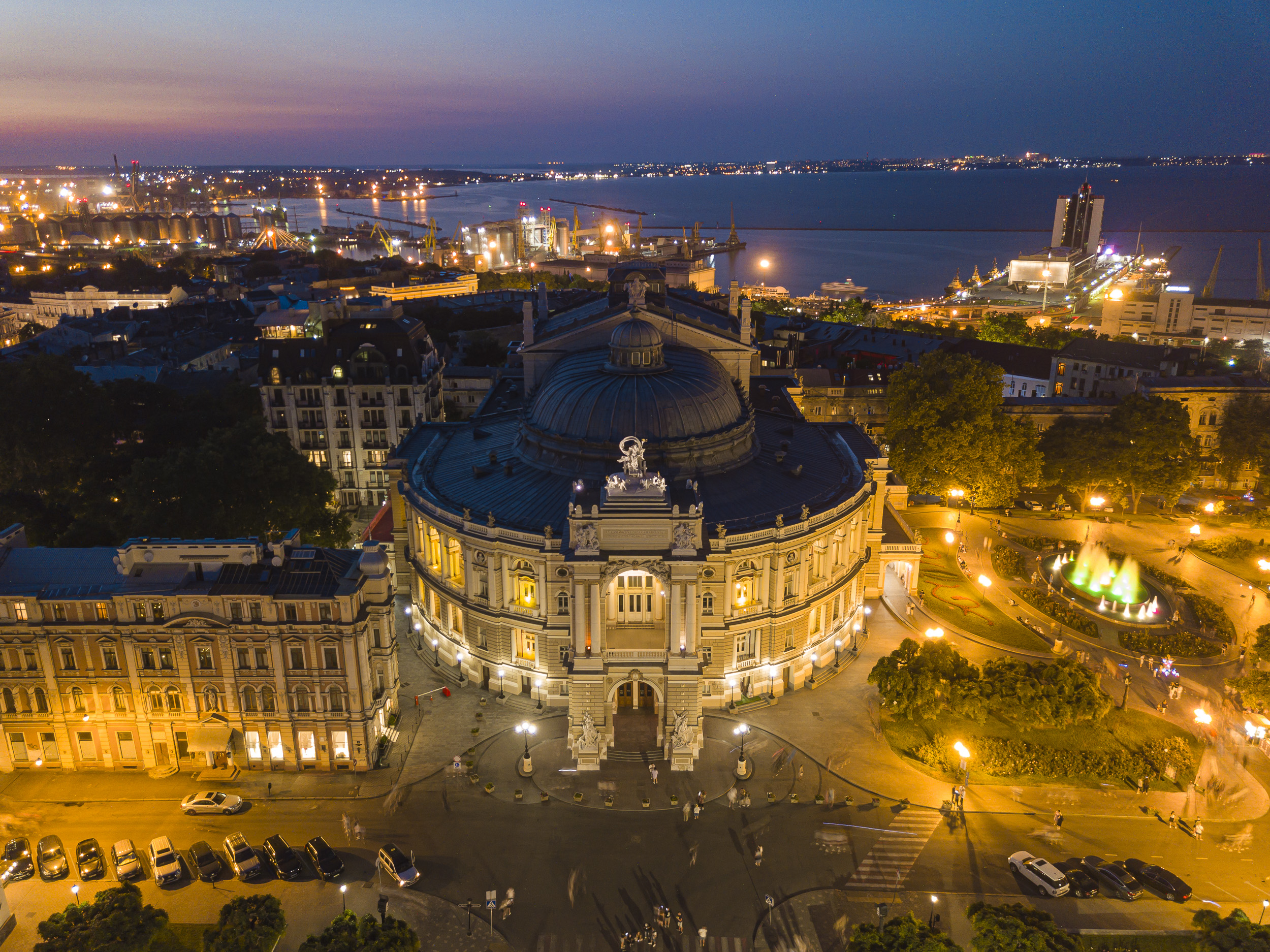

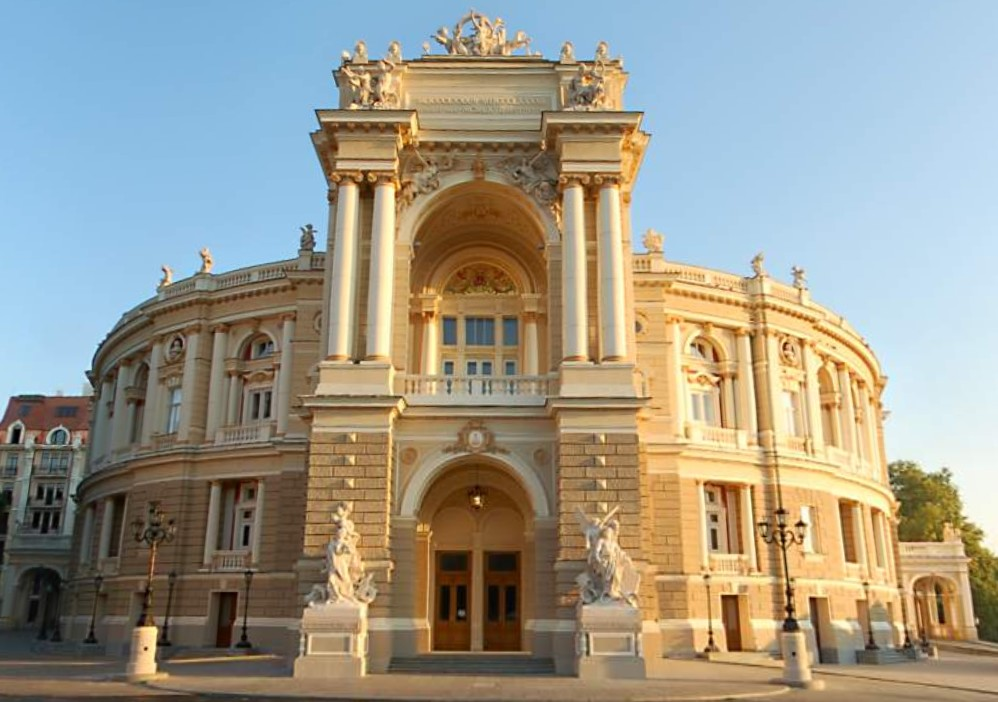

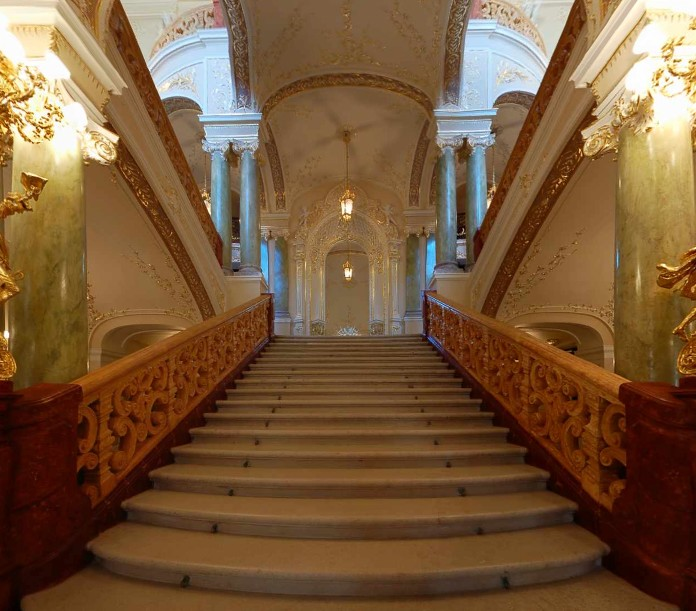

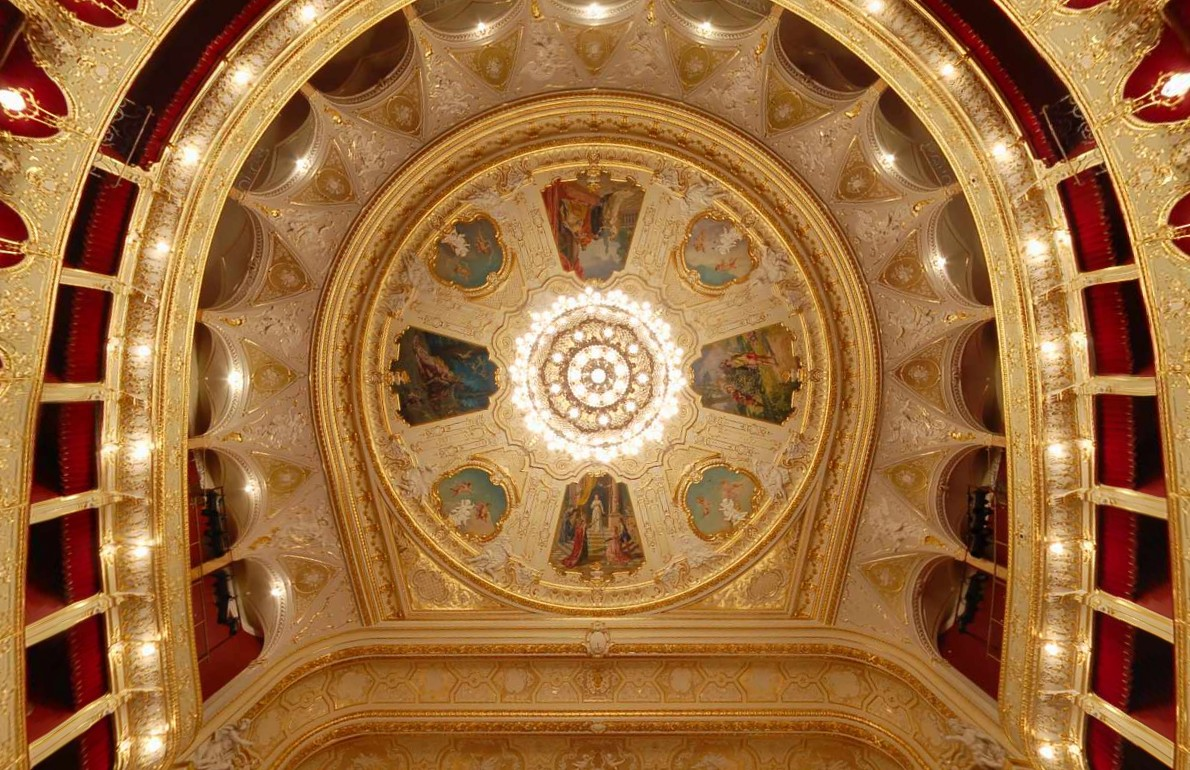

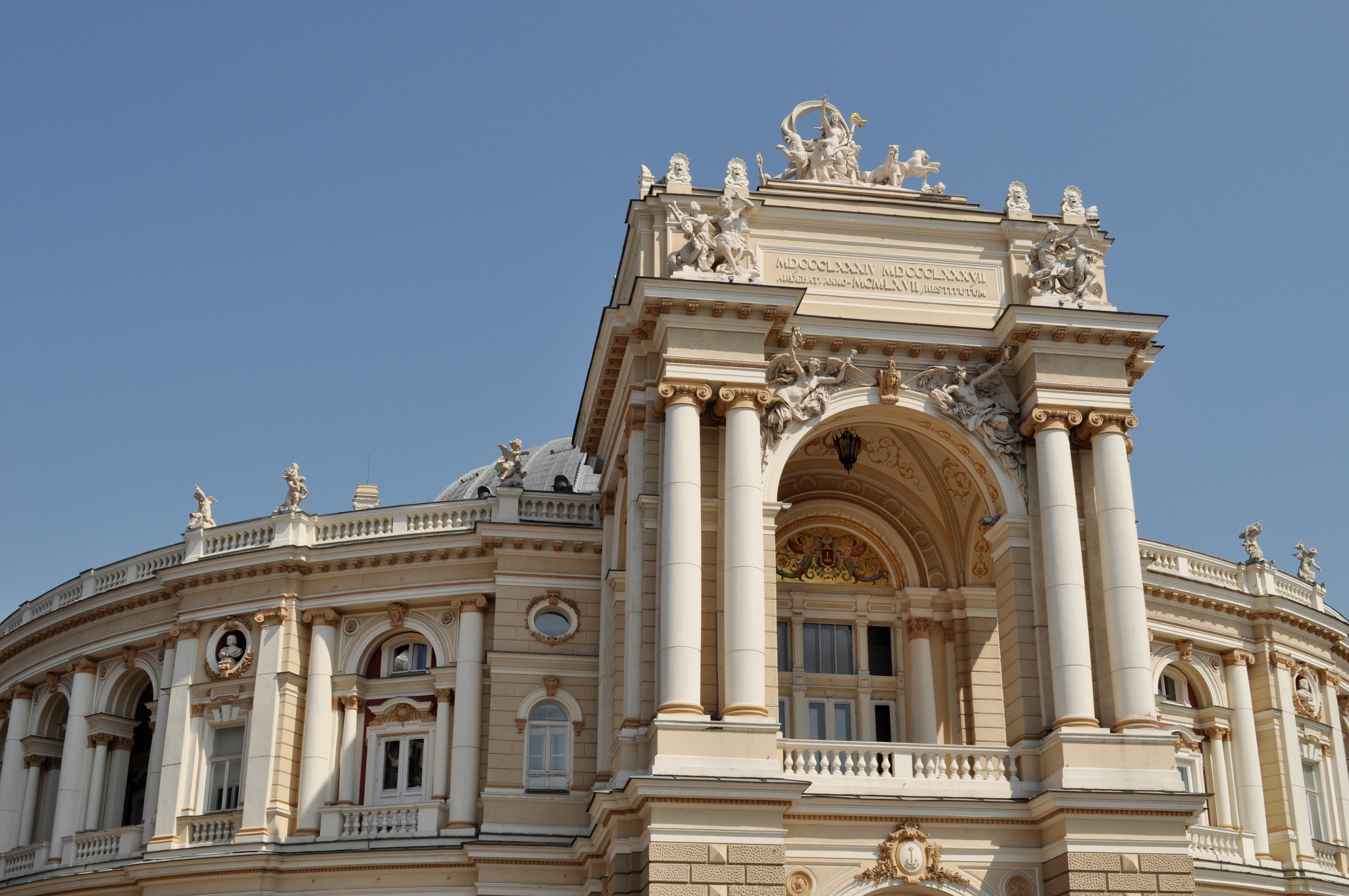

== See also ==
- Odesa Philharmonic Theatre
- Tatiana Stepanova (ballerina)
