= Alyona Mikhaylova =

Russian actress

- Алёна Михайлова
- Born: Elena Dmitrievna Mikhaylova; October 11, 1995 (age 30); Perm, Russia
- Other names: Alyona
- Occupation: Actress
- Years active: 2018–present
- Notable work: Tchaikovsky's Wife

Elena Dmitrievna Mikhaylova (Russian: Еле́на Дми́триевна Миха́йлова; born October 11, 1995), known professionally as Alyona Mikhaylova, is a Russian television and film actress.

== Early life ==
Born in Perm, Perm Oblast, Russia (now Perm Krai) in 1995, Mikhaylova is a Perm State Institute of Culture graduate (Theatre and Film Acting, Tatyana Zharkova's course). In 2018, Mikhaylova starred in Tesla Boy's videoclip Compromise. After graduation, she moved to Moscow to pursue a career in filmmaking.

In 2019, she played the main part in Maria Agranovich's movie Love Them All. In 2020, she starred in three TV series: Vodovorot (TV series), Wolf (Russian TV series), and Chiki (TV series).

In 2021, she played in Roman Vasyanov's film Hostel movie and in Roman Kiriyenko's TV series The Happiness Clinic. In 2021, she played Antonina Miliukova in Kirill Serebrennikov's drama Tchaikovsky's Wife, a participant in the competition program of the 2022 Cannes Film Festival. Mikhaylova's performance in the film was praised by critics as tremendous.
