= Theory of attempted suicide by Pyotr Ilyich Tchaikovsky =

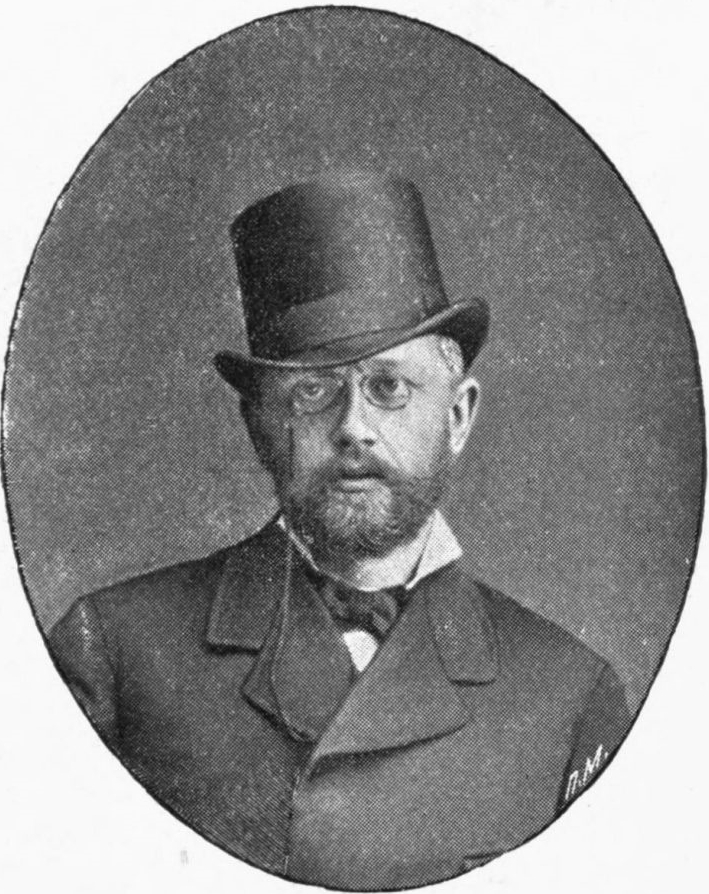
Unknown photographer. Pyotr Ilyich Tchaikovsky, 1877

A number of researchers, based on the memoirs of Nikolai Kashkin, a professor at the Moscow Conservatory, suggest that in 1877, Pyotr Ilyich Tchaikovsky made a suicide attempt and attribute it to the composer's stay in Moscow between September 11 (September 23) and September 24 (October 6), 1877. He went into the cold water of the Moskva river with the firm intention of falling ill with a severe cold or pneumonia. The circumstances of this event are described in the memoirs of Nikolai Kashkin, the composer's colleague and friend, which were written shortly after the composer's death. The publication of their journal version in the Russkoye Obozreniye began in September 1894 and was completed in December 1895 (issues 29-36). In 1920, in the collection The Past of Russian Music. Materials and Studies, Nikolai Kashkin's article From Memories of P. I. Tchaikovsky was published. In it, he described in detail the circumstances under which Tchaikovsky himself, according to Kashkin's assertion, described the circumstances of an attempted suicide.

Kashkin's story attracted the attention of several publicists. The scene of the composer's suicide attempt appears in the two-part feature film Tchaikovsky, directed by Soviet director Igor Talankin in 1969, and in British director Ken Russell's 1971 film The Music Lovers.

== Circumstances ==
=== Nikolai Kashkin ===
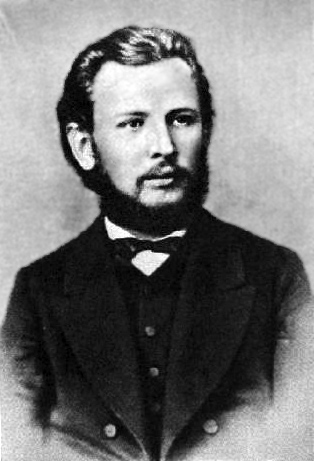
Nikolai Kashkin (photo date unknown)

In the 1860s and 1870s, Nikolai Kashkin regularly attended meetings of the Moscow circle of musicians headed by Nikolai Rubinstein. This group consisted of teachers of music classes at the Moscow branch of the Russian Musical Society, and later at the Moscow Conservatory, which was formed on their basis in 1866. Tchaikovsky's works were often performed and discussed at its meetings. For several years, a close friend of both, Herman Laroche, who had studied at the St. Petersburg Conservatory in the first half of the 1860s, was an intermediary in correspondence between Kashkin and the composer, who lived in St. Petersburg. It was Nikolai Kashkin who initiated Tchaikovsky's invitation to teach music theory classes in Moscow. The personal acquaintance of Kashkin and Tchaikovsky took place in January 1866 after the composer's arrival in Moscow.

During the composer's residence in Moscow, Kashkin and Tchaikovsky constantly met at classes at the Moscow Conservatory, at evenings at the "Artistic Circle" and at meetings of the Conservatory's teachers' circle, and they often played four-hand arrangements of symphonic works. When difficulties arose during his work at the Conservatory, Tchaikovsky usually turned not to Rubinstein, at whose apartment he lived, but to Kashkin. After the composer's departure from Moscow in 1877, Kashkin and Tchaikovsky corresponded, but their meetings were no longer regular. Nevertheless, Kashkin claimed: "the shortness of our relationship allowed us to understand each other with half a word," and the composer highly valued his friendship with him. Tchaikovsky's brother Modest wrote that Laroche and Kashkin came to visit the composer most often in Maidanovo. Kashkin spent two months at the composer's Frolovskoye estate in the summer of 1890.

Tchaikovsky would fill his friend in on his creative plans and details of his work, and in some cases, he asked for advice. At Tchaikovsky's request, Kashkin made an arrangement of Swan Lake for piano and then worked with the composer to revise and correct it to make it easier to perform. The communication between the two musicians went beyond the professional sphere. During their meetings, they discussed works of Russian literature, publications in literary magazines related to the "Russian intellectual movement," and attended performances at the Maly Theater.

=== Kashkin's memories ===
Among Tchaikovsky's contemporaries, only Nikolai Kashkin, a professor at the Moscow Conservatory, claimed that the composer attempted suicide in 1877. He described the circumstances of the suicide very briefly in his book Memories of P. I. Tchaikovsky. This book was the first detailed biography of the composer published in Russian. Memories of P. I. Tchaikovsky was written shortly after his death. The publication of their journal version in the Russian Review began in September 1894 and was completed in December 1895 (issues 29-36). In 1896, an edition of Kashkin's memoirs by Peter Jurgenson was published as a separate book. A reprint of the book was published in 1954, with slight reductions undertaken by the publishers, which they claimed did not affect the 1877 events.

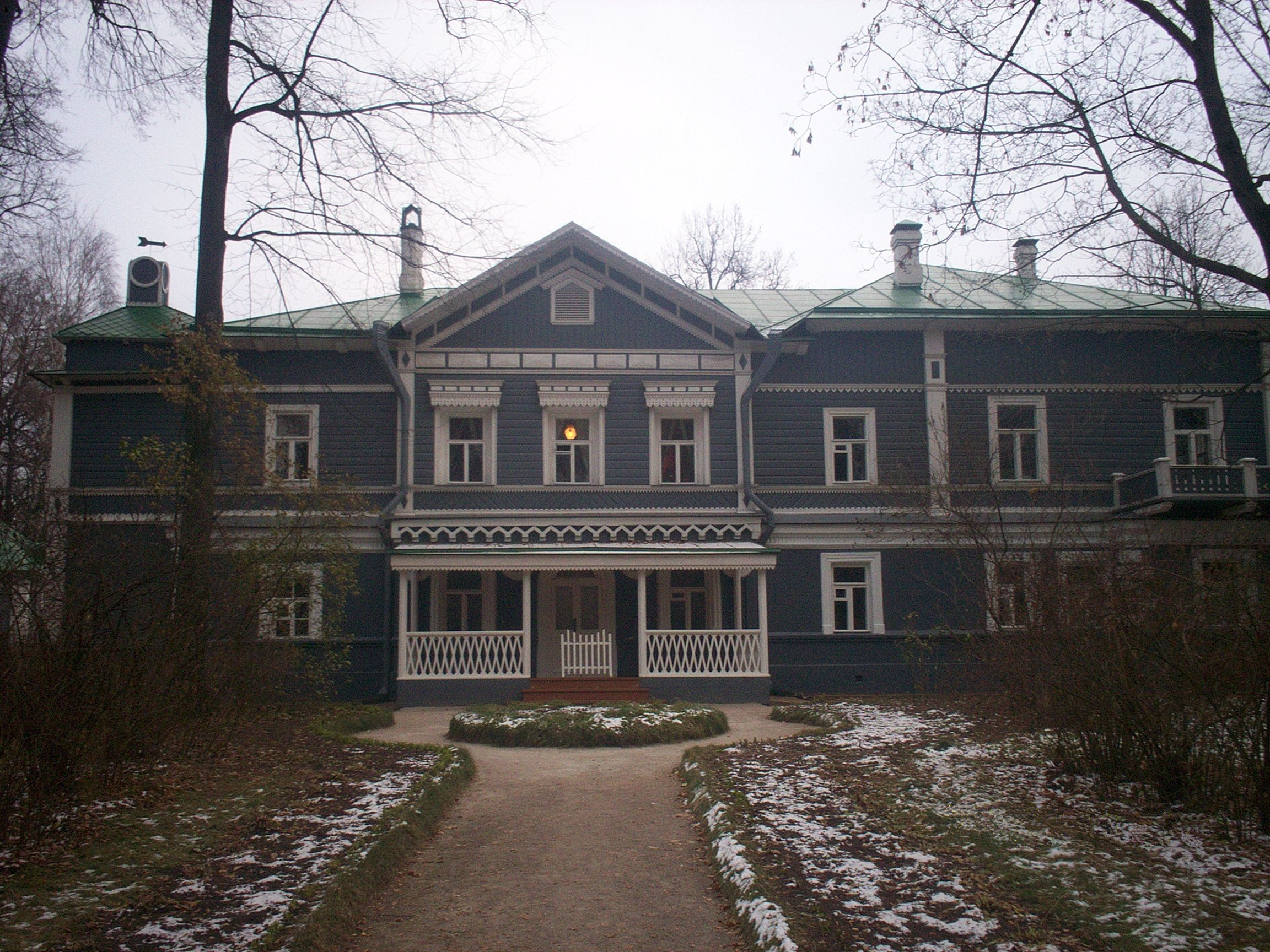
Tchaikovsky House in Klin, main entrance, 2007

After the October Revolution, Kashkin "joined the revolutionary-minded intellectuals... deeply believed in the emerging new... Soviet system...". He continued his musical and literary work, but the articles he created were not published at that time. In 1919, he unexpectedly received a proposal from the Music Department of the People's Commissariat of Education of the RSFSR to publish the articles he had created in recent years.

In 1920, in the collection The Past of Russian Music. Materials and Studies, Nikolai Kashkin's article From Memories of P. I. Tchaikovsky was published. Academician of the Academy of Sciences of the USSR, and one of the founders of Soviet musicology, Boris Asafyev (under the pseudonym Igor Glebov), in the introductory article to the collection, expressed gratitude to the author for his memories and even contrasted them with the memories of Modest Tchaikovsky, which he considered "somewhat outdated" and "myopic". Kashkin's memoirs, published in the collection, were, according to Asafiev, an account of "an extremely important and the darkest event in the composer's life — his marriage".

At the very beginning of his narrative, Kashkin informed his readers that in the pre-revolutionary edition of his memoirs, he, "for various reasons about which there is no need to talk", had to summarize as briefly as possible this episode, which had a fateful significance for the composer's further biography and work. Kashkin claimed that his new article was based on Tchaikovsky's own recollections. They were, according to the professor, a "coherent sequential narrative" which he had heard "without any initiative on his part".

Kashkin did not specify the exact date when he heard the story but reported that the matter took place in Klin at the composer's house, where he usually came for Holy Week. The conversation took place after a walk when Tchaikovsky and his companion returned to the house. It was not yet late, but it was beginning to get dark. Both sat at the round table in silence. Tchaikovsky looked through the letters for a while, and Kashkin read newspapers. The composer invited him to read a letter from Antonina Miliukova, and then began the story of his attempt at suicide:

We were in silence for a while. The darkness in the room had thickened to such an extent that the face of my interlocutor was not quite clear to me. Without any introduction, Tchaikovsky began his story in a flat, as if fallen voice, quite unexpectedly, and carried it on, all the time without changing his tone, as if fulfilling something obligatory... Tchaikovsky, as he began his story, carried it through to the end in a steady voice, almost without raising intonation. At the same time, one could hear that he was very worried, and that this evenness of tone was the result of a great effort to restrain himself and not give free rein to his nerves. It probably took quite a long time, for it was completely dark, and we could barely see each other by the end.

Nikolai Kashkin claimed that there was no exchange of remarks about what they had heard either that day or any time later. They both had dinner, and the evening was spent reading or playing four-hands pieces. The author of the memoirs insisted that the composer's brothers Modest and Anatoly had received information about these events (unlike himself) not from Tchaikovsky, but from third parties. He claimed that he reproduced Tchaikovsky's story almost verbatim, and even if he shortened something in it, he never added anything to it. That is why, according to him, Kashkin in this fragment of his memoirs began to narrate in the first person (on behalf of Tchaikovsky) and based his memoirs on the notes he made during the composer's story.

=== Kashkin's account of the attempt ===
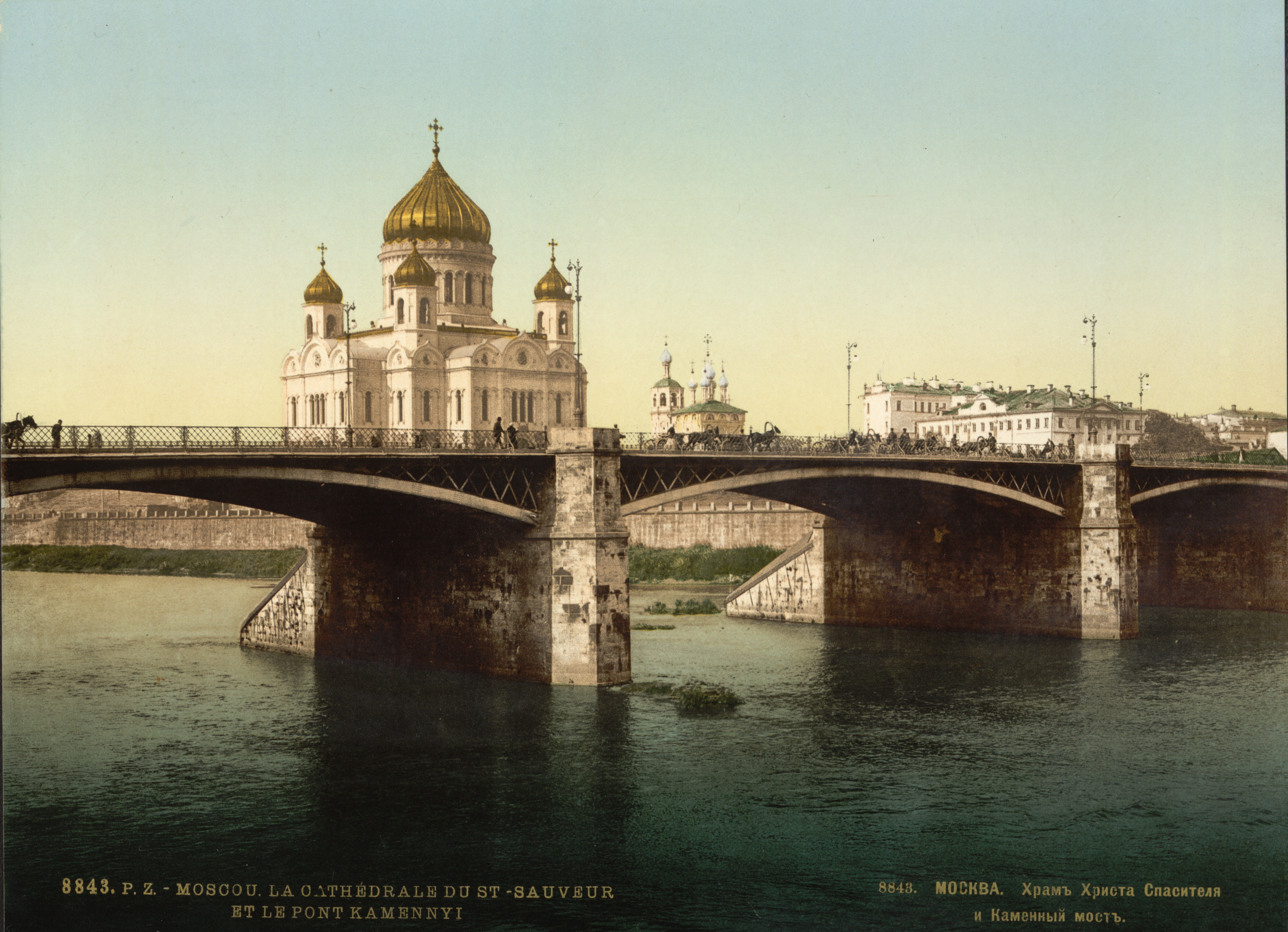
The Great Stone Bridge in 1896-1897. Image from the Prints and Photographs Division of the Library of Congress, LC-DIG-ppmsc-03844

On September 11 (September 23), 1877. (Note: In the 19th century, the difference between the Julian and Gregorian calendars was 12 days. In the 20th and 21st centuries the difference is 13 days.) (Note: Valery Sokolov gave a different date, September 12 (September 24), 1877.) Tchaikovsky returned to Moscow from Kamianka. Nikolai Kashkin believed that the attempted suicide was not the result of a coincidence of circumstances. He wrote in his book Memories of P. I. Tchaikovsky that the thought of suicide appeared in Pyotr Ilyich "while still in Moscow." In Kashkin's opinion, the composer believed that "death was the only way out for him, but at the same time, thoughts of his relatives, of how they would be struck by his open suicide, made him seek death as if by accident". In a book of reminiscences about Tchaikovsky, he wrote: "Later he told me that during the cold nights of September, when the frost had already begun, he took advantage of the darkness to go near the Stone Bridge, (Note: By the mid-19th century, the Vsekhsvyatsky (or Bolshoi) Stone Bridge over the Moskva River had become dilapidated. In the 1850s, it was decided to demolish the structure Engineer Nikolai Voskoboynikov built a new structure, designed by engineer Alexander Tannenberg and made of metal. However, it retained the name of the Big Stone Bridge. The river span was spanned by arches, and the sidewalk was covered with gunmetal slabs. The Bolshoy Kamenny Bridge was dismantled in Soviet times due to the construction of the Moscow Canal (1932-1937) and rising water levels in the river.) dressed in the river almost to the waist and remained in the water as long as he had the fortitude to bear the brokenness of the cold water; but probably his extremely excited state protected him from a fatal cold, and therefore his attempt remained without any result at all for his health".

Kashkin wrote that none of his colleagues or himself had any idea of the events that were taking place in 1877. As usual, Tchaikovsky was teaching at the Conservatory in September, although he was characterized at this time by "concentrated taciturnity" and a desire to avoid talking to his colleagues. At the end of September, he appeared "with a distorted face, said that he was immediately summoned to St. Petersburg by E. F. Napravnik, showed us a telegram and hurriedly left, referring to preparations for departure. A few days later we learned of his serious illness, and then of his departure for an indefinite time abroad".

Nikolai Kashkin claimed that the composer himself told him the story of his suicide attempt in this way, which he recounted on his behalf in the article From Memoirs of P. I. Tchaikovsky, published for the first time in the year of the composer's death (1920) in the collection The Past of Russian Music. Materials and Studies": once on such night I went to the deserted bank of the Moskva river, and the thought occurred to me of the possibility of getting a deadly cold. To this end, unseen by anyone in the darkness, I went into the water almost waist-deep and stayed as long as I could stand the brokenness in my body from the cold. I came out of the water with the firm conviction that I was not going to die of inflammation or any other cold disease, and at home I told them that I had taken part in night fishing and had accidentally fallen into the water. My health was, however, so strong that the ice bath passed for me without any consequences". The composer, according to Kashkin, admitted to him that he did not make similar attempts afterwards.

Tchaikovsky allegedly explained his unusual method of suicide as follows: "It was natural to come to the conviction that only death, which had become my desire, could set me free, but I could not dare to commit an explicit, open suicide for fear of inflicting too cruel a blow to my old father, and also to my brothers. I began to think of means of disappearing less conspicuously and as if from a natural cause; one such means I even tried".

=== Other accounts of September 1877 ===
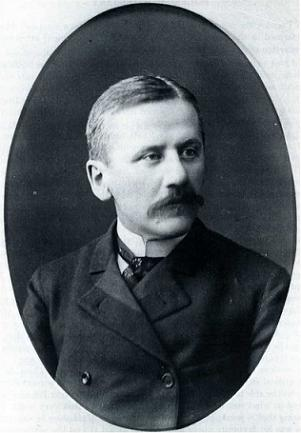
Modest Tchaikovsky is the composer's brother and his biographer

Tchaikovsky's brother Modest (Note: Nikolai Kashkin knew this version and presented it in his article From Memoirs of P. I. Tchaikovsky before his own version of the events in Moscow.) describes the events in a completely different way: on September 20, the composer got ill. On September 24 (October 6), 1877, claiming that he had allegedly received a telegram demanding his immediate presence in St. Petersburg, he left Moscow "in an almost maddening state of mind". He had changed so much in appearance that his brother —the future senator and Privy Councillor Anatoly, who came to meet him at the station— hardly recognized him. He was brought to the nearest hotel, Dagmara, "where after a violent nervous fit he fell into unconsciousness, which lasted about two weeks" (in later publications, there were notes to this fragment: "should read — about two days", a term followed by some researchers). When Tchaikovsky finally recovered, the doctors named a complete change of lifestyle as the only condition for recovery. The composer went abroad, and by early October, Modest attributed the beginning of his slow recovery to the beginning of October.

Tchaikovsky himself wrote in July 1877 in a letter to his patroness Nadezhda von Meck about his own spiritual state and the possibility of committing suicide:

I fell into a deep despair, all the more terrible because there was no one to support and reassure me. I began to desire death passionately, greedily. Death seemed to me the only way out, but violent death was out of the question. I must tell you that I am deeply attached to some of my relatives, i.e., my sister, my two younger brothers, and my father. I know that, having decided to commit suicide and having put this thought into execution, I would strike a fatal blow to these relatives. There are many other people, some close friends, whose love and friendship bind me inseparably to life. Besides, I have a weakness (if it can be called so) for loving life, loving my work, and loving my future successes. Finally, I have not yet said all that I can and want to say before it is time for me to move into eternity. (Irina Okhalova. Pyotr Ilyich Tchaikovsky).

Yuri Davidov, the composer's nephew and close friend, in the book Notes on P. I. Tchaikovsky, published in 1962, wrote only a cryptic phrase about the events of September 1877: "In the life of Pyotr Ilyich this marriage turned into an internal catastrophe, from which he almost died".

== Causes of the attempt ==
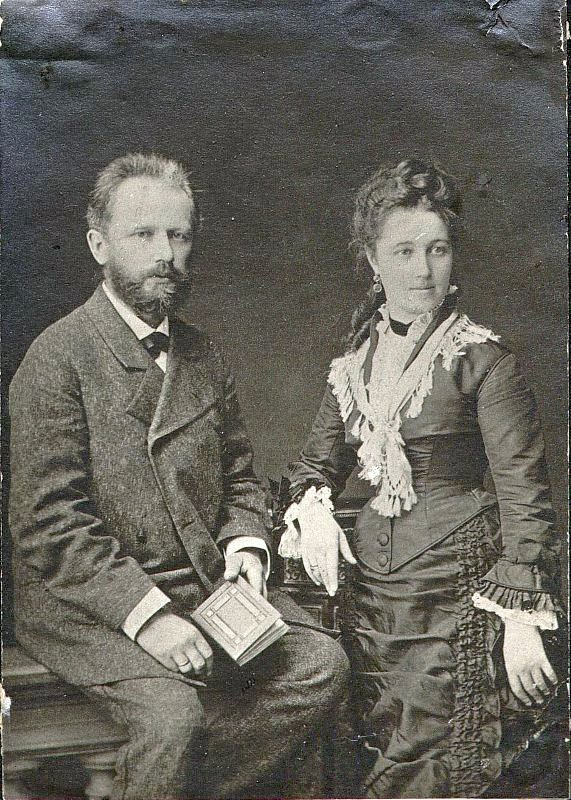
Ivan Diagovchenko. Pyotr Ilyich Tchaikovsky with his wife Antonina Ivanovna Miliukova. July 24, 1877, Moscow

In 1889, Pyotr Ilyich Tchaikovsky wrote an autobiography for his former colleague at the Moscow Conservatory, Otto Neitzel, who published it in the German journal Nord und Süd. In it, Tchaikovsky described his departure from the Conservatory in 1877, but remained silent about the history of his marriage, his severe mental crisis, and his departure from the Russian Empire for Italy and Switzerland. In this document, Tchaikovsky gave three reasons for his teaching quitting:

- Negative opinion of teaching as something that takes time and energy away from creativity; (Note: Alexander Poznansky believed that teaching was "psychologically opposed" to Tchaikovsky. Many people disliked that he paid too much attention to students who, in his opinion, were distinguished by talent. Even more discontent was caused by the composer's attention to outwardly attractive teenagers (he even paid tuition for thirteen-year-old Samuil Litvinov) and his preference for young male students over female students.)
- Excessive consumption of strong alcohol;
- Overwork had an effect on the nervous system, and this caused an illness that the composer himself did not name.

So, in spite of myself, I divided ten years of my life between my teaching duties and my favorite compositional work, which filled the rest of my time. Eventually, this clear division [of time] stopped working. My Moscow friends, both collectively and individually, were eagerly consuming strong drinks, and since I myself had always had an obvious inclination toward the fruit of the vine, I soon [began] to take a more than permissible part in drinking parties, which I had previously avoided. My tireless activity, combined with such Bacchic entertainments, could not but have a most disastrous effect on my nervous system: in 1877 I fell ill and was forced to resign my position at the Conservatory for some time. (Polina Weidman. Tchaikovsky's Biographies in Russian Musical Historiography of the 19th - 20th Centuries).

Usually, the possibility of Pyotr Ilyich Tchaikovsky's attempted suicide is connected by researchers with the beginning of his life with Antonina Miliukova. Valery Sokolov, summarizing the study of the history of the marriage by previous researchers, wrote that the characterization of the composer's wife is usually reduced to two personality traits — "bourgeoisie" "plus madness", and the assumption of two reasons for the marriage: "love blackmail" by Miliukova (a threat of suicide in case of the composer's refusal) and "the hypnosis of Eugene Onegin" (Tchaikovsky was working on this opera, and unexpectedly its plot coincided with the circumstances of his personal life — Miliukova sent him a letter similar in content to Tatiana's letter to Onegin). Sokolov himself considered this point of view wrong, pointing out, for example, that Miliukova had known the composer since 1872, and that the composer was also a member of her family. Poznansky even named the exact date and place of their acquaintance — May 1872 in the apartment of Antonina's brother— Alexander Miliukov. Alexander Poznansky lists a number of reasons for the marriage: to placate his family, to set an example for Modest's brother — an active homosexual in whose care a teenager from a wealthy family was entrusted (i.e. the deaf-mute Kolya Konradi, whom Modest had raised as a guardian since 1882), the dream of domestic comfort, and the desire to cover up his homosexual ties by marrying a shallow and submissive woman. To prove the latter motive, Poznansky quotes words from the composer's letter that, in his opinion, were the main virtue of the future wife — Miliukova was in love with him "like a cat". The wedding took place in the Church of St. George in Malaya Nikitskaya Street on July 6 (July 18), 1877. Of the composer's numerous relatives, only his brother Anatoly was invited to the ceremony. The priest who performed the ceremony was Tchaikovsky's good friend, archpriest Dmitri Razumovsky, an active member of the Society of Lovers of Old Russian Art and the Moscow Archaeographical Society.

Modest Tchaikovsky noted that Antonina Milukova, as his brother put it, "acted honestly and sincerely", without consciously deceiving him in anything, and "unwillingly and unconsciously" was the cause of her husband's deepest and strongest misfortune. For his part, the composer also acted "honestly, openly, without deceiving her in anything". Both of them, after their marriage, "saw with horror... that between them lay a gulf of mutual misunderstanding, nothing that could never be filled, that they had been acting as if in a dream and had deceived each other in everything against their will. A complete rupture was the only means not only for the further well-being of both, but also for saving the life of Pyotr Ilyich". Another point of view was expressed by Alexandra Orlova, a former employee of the Tchaikovsky State House-Museum in Klin. She claimed that Milukova "suffered from an obvious sexual psychosis", citing as confirmation the fact of her twelve-year stay and death in a psychiatric hospital. The same opinion was expressed by the American musicologist Roland John Wiley. In his opinion, Tchaikovsky did not at first perceive "her mannerisms as symptoms of mental illness" and only realized the problem when he saw Antonina speak at an evening organized by Pyotr Jurgenson. British musicologist David Brown, however, described the events at this soiree as follows: "Tchaikovsky's friends were naturally interested in Antonina, and Jurgenson arranged a dinner at his own house so that they could meet her. Predictably, she was uncomfortable, and her husband kept interrupting [her conversations with friends] to finish what she might have wanted to say but dared not".

The Soviet local historian and biographer Vladimir Kholodkovsky added to the family problem other, in his opinion, no less important causes of the composer's inner crisis: acute criticism of Tchaikovsky's works in the Russian media and the need to destroy "life circumstances" and break with "environment" in order to gain creative freedom. Such a situation, from the researcher's point of view, was already present in Tchaikovsky's life in 1862-1863, when he rejected a career as an official and chose the doubtful, from the point of view of public opinion, career of a musician. Each time this situation demanded from the composer "an enormous expenditure of vital forces".

Andrei Budyakovsky, a Soviet musicologist, senior researcher at the Academy of Art History, and chairman of the Theory and Criticism Section of the Union of Composers of the USSR, believed that in 1873, "in addition to his [the composer's] will and desire, a young life was lost in similar situations. Budyakovsky argued: "Some available materials give reason to conclude that there was a serious nervous shock in Tchaikovsky's life at the end of 1873. Unfortunately, it has not yet been possible to determine its content more precisely". According to the researcher, Tchaikovsky was afraid that if he rejected Milukova, the tragedy would repeat itself. At the same time, the lack of common interests with his wife, common topics of conversation had a depressing effect on the composer. In September 1877, Tchaikovsky was on the verge of committing a crime: "in a mad, painful rage, he was ready to strangle his wife".

Nadezhda Tumanina, a student of art history and the author of a two-volume book on the composer's life and work, believed that the suicide attempt was connected with Tchaikovsky's nervous illness. According to her, it had been developing for a long time and ended in a crisis. The crisis provoked a rash step—marriage with Antonina Miliukova, "a young woman who turned out to be shallow and undeveloped, with bourgeois tastes, besides being mentally unstable, accelerated the onset of the crisis." Attacks of longing combined with the realization of "the irreparability of what had happened" led, in her opinion, to a suicide attempt and a serious illness. The composer left his work at the Moscow Conservatory and went abroad. There, Tchaikovsky began to recover. The "cure" for him was working on the Fourth Symphony and the opera Eugene Onegin. He finally overcame the crisis only in February 1878. The position of Ekaterina Ruchievskaya, doctor of art history, professor at the St. Petersburg State Rimsky-Korsakov Conservatory, was similar. She wrote: "the crisis had been brewing for a long time, from within and gradually," and "it would be completely wrong to think that ... [the crisis] led only to an unsuccessful marriage".

Alexander Poznansky, a graduate of the Faculty of History at Saint Petersburg State University and an associate of Yale University, interpreted the reasons for the composer's alleged suicide as being related to his homosexual attraction. In his opinion, the spiritual crisis should be dated from 1875-1877 (Poznansky even suggested that it was the last crisis of this kind, but that "we know nothing about the preceding ones"). According to the researcher, until the mid-1870s, Tchaikovsky, "as it happens with many people of this characteristic, did not allow himself to think that his inclination was insurmountable". Poznansky thus reconstructed the composer's train of thought: "...I will indulge my inclination as long as it is possible; when it is necessary to stop categorically, I will make an effort over myself, renounce my habits and live like all other normal people". In letters from this period, the composer uses the word "vice" in reference to his sexual proclivities, but from the researcher's point of view, he had no sense of his own sinfulness. He did not perceive it as an anomaly. Tchaikovsky characterized "public opinion" as "various despicable creatures" and did not want to pay attention to it. Alexander Poznansky came to the following conclusion about the composer's possible reaction to the spread of rumors about his sexual orientation: "Tchaikovsky was a mentally insecure, vulnerable person and painfully perceived incidents of this kind." At the same time, the researcher denied that the consequences could have had a radical character: "It is far from saying that something of this kind could have driven him to suicide". The composer was also worried about the situation of his family, particularly about the activities of his father, who insisted on his son's marriage.

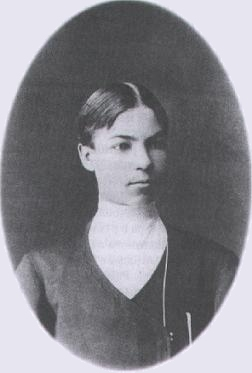
Alexei Sofronov, 2nd half of 19th century

It was only during his brief marital relationship with Antonina Miliukova that Tchaikovsky realized that he "belongs by nature to a rare type of homosexual exceptional, and any kind of collision with a woman is impossible for him". On July 26, Tchaikovsky left his wife in Yessentuki on the pretext of treating her stomach. He was accompanied by his servant, Alexei Sofronov. On the way, he stopped at Kamianka on the estate of his relatives, the Davydovs, and there he decided to refuse to continue the journey and at the same time not to return to Moscow. Poznansky believed that this decision, unexpected by those close to him, was due to the fact that "he had returned to his 'natural impulses,' having fallen in love with the teenage lackey Eustafy". (Note: Poznansky quoted a fragment of the composer's letter to Modest, dated September 9, 1877, about Eustafia: "My charm, of whom I cannot think without the fact that x ... do not do on guard, and to whom I would consider myself lucky for a lifetime to clean boots, take out pots, and in general all kinds of humiliation, just to have at least occasionally the right to kiss his hands and feet".) On his way back, he stopped in Kyiv and spent three days with his servant, the eighteen-year-old Alexei Sofronov, who, in Tchaikovsky's own words, was "extremely nice".

While his wife derived pleasure from their life together, the composer fell into a state of despair as time passed after the marriage. In Poznansky's opinion, he belatedly began to realize his sexual and psychological incompatibility with Miliukova. It was only then that he began to realize that the plan to strengthen his social position and the stability of his personal life through marriage had failed; moreover, there was a danger not only of exposing the composer's own intimate desires but also of disgracing his family. He fell into a state of hopelessness and longed to return to his creative work and his usual stable life.

In his two-volume biography of Tchaikovsky, Poznansky drew attention to the dramatic change in the composer's attitude toward Miliukova during the short second period of their life together (September 11-24). In letters to his brothers during this period, he first used the name "Antonina" to refer to his wife, then "that lady," "wife," later switching to the expressions "a well-known person," "a female creature bearing my name," and finally "a disgusting creation of nature," "an abomination" (which is how he would refer to her after 1877, "as if it were her own name"), "a bitch". Poznansky assumed that the cause must have been some event related to a change in Antonina's tactics and strategy toward her husband. From his point of view, she decided during his absence that it was time for Tchaikovsky to start fulfilling his marital duties, and she began actively using "coquetry, all sorts of feminine tricks, entreaties and demands" in the struggle to achieve this goal, eventually going on the "decisive offensive." It was this that drove the composer to despair, for in his view, Miliukova had flagrantly violated the agreement "on 'brotherly love' made in July".

Galina Poberezhnaya, doctor of art history, professor, and pioneer of music therapy, pointed out that women played a very important role in the life and ideas of the composer. She was the embodiment of: A) the maternal beginning (the researcher emphasized the great role of lullabies in Tchaikovsky's works; for example, in the opera Mazepa, Maria's lullaby is addressed not to a child but to an adult—her lover) and B) "a strong dramatic personality" (in his operas, the female image "leads the action" or "serves as its center"). Poberezhnaya concluded that Tchaikovsky had "a special interest in a creatively gifted woman, actively, powerfully realizing her talent"—in the "tamer". At the same time, according to Poberezhnaya, Tchaikovsky was not sexually attracted to women. He did not hide from Miliukova his lack of attraction to her and his desire to build family relations on a rational basis. In addition, Miliukova was not only undistinguished by talent but was indifferent to music, even with a musical education. According to Poberezhnaya, relations with her led Tchaikovsky to a suicide attempt and a serious and prolonged nervous illness. At the same time, the researcher argues that the crisis of 1877 divided the composer's life and work into two different periods, opening the period of "brilliant" works.

== Interpretations by biographers ==
=== Doubters ===
In the memoirs of Tchaikovsky's friend, architect Ivan Klimenko, Pyotr Ilyich Tchaikovsky. A Brief Biographical Sketch, there is no mention of the suicide attempt. He recounted in detail Modest Tchaikovsky's version of events. At the same time, Klimenko wrote that he knew Kashkin well and talked with him about the circumstances of the composer's death. Ekaterina Ruchievskaya, who devoted a whole chapter of her biography of the composer to the year 1877, made no mention of the suicide attempt. The Soviet musicologist Galina Pribegina also ignored Kashkin's message completely and did not mention anything about it in her biography of the composer published in 1983.

The musicologist and biographer of Tchaikovsky, Joseph Kunin, who wrote about the events in Moscow in a book published in 1958 in the series The Lives of Remarkable People, avoided asking the question of the suicide: "Unbearable agony tormented him, death seemed to be a liberation, consciousness began to be confused. With a last effort of will, he forced himself to leave for St. Petersburg on September 24". Soviet musicologist Arnold Alshvang, in his book P. I. Tchaikovsky (1970), analyzed in detail Kashkin's musicological works on Tchaikovsky but completely ignored his account of the composer's suicide attempt. Local historian Lidia Koniskaya did not consider it possible to talk about the composer's realization of a suicide attempt. In her monograph on Tchaikovsky's stay in St. Petersburg, she mentioned the despair that seized the composer in September 1877 and the passionate desire for freedom and creativity. She believed that these feelings were the result of a failed marriage. In her words, Tchaikovsky was only "close to suicide". Similar views were expressed by contemporary musicologist Irina Okhalova in a 2015 book based on the composer's personal correspondence from July 1877.

Polina Vaidman, the curator of Tchaikovsky's manuscript collection at the composer's house museum in Klin, a Ph.D. in art history, called Kashkin's memoirs in the 1920 collection deliberately false memoirs and a "romantic myth," and wrote that the reasons that led Kashkin to write them and Boris Asafiev to publish them are unknown.

Alexander Poznansky, in his monograph Tchaikovsky in St. Petersburg (2011) and his two-volume biography of the composer, suggested that Kashkin's accounts should be treated critically, writing that they suffer from "obvious chronological confusion and excessive drama." He also pointed out that Kashkin was never among the composer's closest friends and that his testimony is often not supported by more authoritative testimony and documents. He compared Tchaikovsky's letter from Clarens to Konstantin Albrecht, a professor at the Moscow Conservatory, dated October 25 (November 6), 1877 ("If I had stayed one more day in Moscow, I would have gone mad or drowned myself in the stinking waves of the still beautiful Moskva river") with Kashkin's memories and concluded that some event might have happened, but more important, from his point of view, is the essential contradiction: The letter refers to the possibility of drowning in the river, not to catching a fatal cold from prolonged exposure. Poznansky noted the distinctly ironic style of the letter and concluded that "the whole idea, as described by Kashkin, is more literary than vital".

Aleksander Poznansky wrote that at times the composer was seized by a desire for death associated with water (for example, the obsessive vision of death in the waves of the river: in The Storm overture, the heroine throws herself into the Volga; in the opera The Queen of Spades, Liza drowns in the Winter Canal), but it was just the raging fantasy of a creative man. From the researcher's point of view, the story of "a serious nervous illness was specially made up by Tchaikovsky himself ... in order to find an excuse to go abroad".

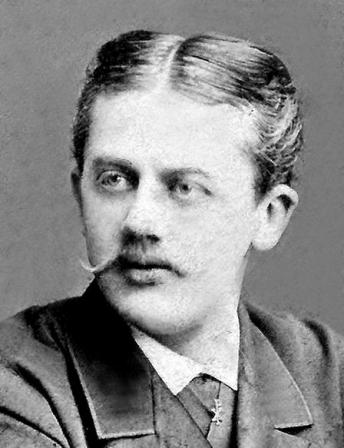
Anatoly Tchaikovsky, before 1915.

In the book Tchaikovsky's Suicide. Myth and Reality, published in 1993, and in the book Tchaikovsky's Death. Legends and Facts (2007), Alexander Poznansky wrote that Kashkin's report is actively used by supporters of the theory of the composer's suicide in 1893, pointing to the composer's disposition to such actions. The researcher refuted this point of view, writing that imprinting —a person's pre-existing psychological experience— plays an important role in solving a psychological crisis. In 1877, Tchaikovsky did not know that going abroad would solve his problems, and in 1893, he had to rely on this positive experience to solve his problems. The researcher considered "escape" rather than "self-destruction" as a typical way out of the crisis for Tchaikovsky. From Poznansky's point of view, the events of 1877 indicate Tchaikovsky's pattern of behavior in a situation of mental crisis—he aimed for maximum solitude and needed only the closest people in such a situation. Based on this model, Poznansky refused to believe that a composer condemned to suicide by a "court of lawyers" could have had fun surrounded by young friends. He also pointed out that if, in 1877, by going into the Moskva river, the composer had two options for the development of events: a serious illness or the absence of any significant effect of cold water on the body, then by taking poison in 1893, Tchaikovsky would have condemned himself to an unconditional death. Poznansky concluded that Tchaikovsky's act in 1877 speaks not of an obsession with the idea of suicide, but of fatalism (willingness to "play 'Russian roulette'").

In these books, Poznansky also noted that there are many questionable points in Kashkin's memoirs. In particular, it is the author's first-person narration: "Researchers of memoir literature know that the parts of memoirs in which memoirists seek to reproduce direct speech or first-person narration are the least trustworthy." And this only if the composer was really so close to Kashkin as to entrust only him and no one else with "such an intimate experience". Poznansky was equally categorical in an article from the English-language collection Tchaikovsky and His World, edited by Leslie Kearney, associate professor of musicology at Indiana University, published in 1998: "Contrary to popular belief, we have no actual evidence that Tchaikovsky attempted suicide after his marriage by wading into the icy cold of the Moskva river. The only source of this myth is the unreliable memoirs of Nikolai Kashkin, written more than forty years later".

However, in a two-volume biography of Tchaikovsky published in 2009, Poznansky characterized the composer in September 1877 as a "resentful child" who "wanted to get sick in order to die. What he was contemplating, the scholar said, was an "infantile gesture" rather than "the desperate determination of a man who really wanted to settle accounts with his life in one way or another". Poznansky also suggested that the serious mental disorder about which Modest and Kashkin wrote was actually invented by Tchaikovsky in order to obtain a pretext for going abroad and material support from Nadezhda von Meck. In reality, it was a hysterical attack, but such events had been happening to the composer since childhood. Musicologist and composer Valery Sokolov, in his monograph Antonina Tchaikovskaya. The Story of a Forgotten Life (1994), even suggested that there was a conspiracy of three brothers at once — Peter, Modest, and Anatoly — which matured as early as August 1877 in Kamianka. The purpose of this conspiracy was to justify the composer's departure from Moscow to St. Petersburg without his wife. From the musicologist's point of view, Anatoly, who disliked Miliukova from their first meeting, probably emphasized their personal incompatibility, while Modest proceeded from physiological problems. Sokolov argued that Tchaikovsky's plan, which had matured as early as 1876, included two components, and he considered this conspiracy only the second part. The first part, however, he called realized during the wedding with the desire to "show others 'that he is like everyone else' and 'stop the gossips'".

Sokolov believed that, based on the text of Kashkin's memoirs, the alleged suicide attempt should be dated to a shorter period of time — between September 17 and 24. However, the researcher emphasized the memoirist's tendency to exaggeration and fantasizing, so he refused to consider his testimony about the suicide attempt as "the absolute truth". To prove his position, he referred to the complete absence of any other evidence of this event from contemporaries. Sokolov believed that in reality, apparently, "Tchaikovsky spilled out the negative emotions accumulated over several months on his unsuspecting wife. From his point of view, there were two possible options: the husband was looking for a reason for a sharp conflict, or Miliukova unwittingly provoked his spouse to it. On the other hand, Sokolov also refused to accept Modest Tchaikovsky's version of two weeks of unconsciousness, referring to the existence of a letter dated October 1, in which the composer is quite "conscious".

Candidate of Historical Sciences and Doctor of Philosophy Igor Kon, as well as Doctor of Historical Sciences Leo Klejn, in their reflections about Tchaikovsky and Miliukova marriage, did not dismiss the possibility of the composer's suicide. Klein, for example, limited his characterization of Tchaikovsky's condition at this time to the word "hysteria".

=== Believers ===
Academician Boris Asafiev, outlining the history of the relationship between Tchaikovsky and Miliukova, wrote: "Despair came to a suicide attempt, to a state close to madness. He realized that he could not live like everyone else..."

The music critic Louis Biancolli, in his book Tchaikovsky and His Orchestral Music (1944), fully accepted Kashkin's version. According to him, Miliukova caused Tchaikovsky both "pity and anxiety with her passionate declarations of love and her equally passionate threats of suicide". This situation was so difficult for Tchaikovsky "that he attempted suicide by standing up to his neck at night in the icy waters of the Neva". According to Biancolli, Tchaikovsky's Fourth Symphony "grew in part out of this sad episode". Roland John Wiley, an American musicologist specializing in 19th-century Russian music and ballet, in his 2009 book Tchaikovsky, expressed no doubts about the reliability of Kashkin's account of the event, although he pointed out that it was "the only source for the account of Tchaikovsky's suicide attempt".

Svetlana Petukhova, candidate of art history and senior researcher of the music history sector of the State Institute of Art History, highly appreciated Kashkin's book Memories of P. I. Tchaikovsky, as well as the memoirs of music critic and composer Herman Laroche about the composer. In her opinion, their memoirs demonstrate "the authors' clear desire to create a complete image of the man and the composer. Both writers were aware of exactly what was required of them: materials where the points of view and conclusions of music and theater professionals are supported by the factual value of the statements of people who interacted closely with Tchaikovsky". She noted Kashkin's "closeness" to Tchaikovsky. Soviet musicologist Semyon Shlifshtein also praised Memories of Tchaikovsky. He called their author "a living witness to the works and days of the composer," and some factual errors Kashkin made were explained by the fact that he wrote in fresh traces, relying on his memory and therefore not checking with documents.

Georgy Glushchenko, a candidate of art history and head of the Department of Composition and Musicology at the Belarusian State Conservatory, wrote in a book about the Russian musician that the composer shared "details of his personal life" with Kashkin, and as a result, he was "almost the only person with whom Tchaikovsky spoke" about marriage. The composer's biographer Vladimir Kholodkovsky wrote about the suicide attempt as a recognized fact of the composer's biography. The same way this news was perceived by Julius Kremelyov, a doctor of art history, in his monograph Tchaikovsky's Symphonies (1955).

The musicologist Alexandra Orlova, a graduate of the Leningrad Institute of Art History and the Philology Department of Leningrad State University, accepted Kashkin's account without reservation. Assuming that Tchaikovsky died not from cholera, but as a result of taking poison, she wrote of the events of September 1877: "This episode, told by him himself, may give a clue to the events of 1893". Another ardent supporter of the version of Tchaikovsky's suicide in 1893 and the "conspiracy of jurisprudence" which, in his view, led to this tragedy, British music professor David Brown spoke of Kashkin's version in the following way in his book Tchaikovsky. The Man and His Music: "Although he wrote it in the first person, and his literal accuracy must be treated with caution, there is no reason to doubt the truthfulness of what he wrote". Brown believed that the first two parts of the tragedy were the same. He believed that the first two movements of the composer's Fourth Symphony were conceived by the composer precisely during a mental crisis. In Brown's view, these two movements are among Tchaikovsky's greatest works. The musicologist wrote: "Both movements are indelibly marked by elements of his own experience during these dark months".

The composer and Russian musicologist, candidate of art history Leonid Sidelnikov had no doubts about the reliability of Kashkin's testimony. In his biography of the composer, published in 1992, he described the suicide attempt as follows: "...late in the evening, unnoticed by anyone, he [Tchaikovsky] left his house, located on Kudrinskaya Square of the Garden Ring, and walked towards the Moskva River, flowing five hundred meters from his home. Almost unconsciously he went waist-deep into the icy water". The story of the attempted suicide was also recounted by psychiatrist Zinaida Ageyeva in her book Tchaikovsky. Genius and Suffering (2019). She briefly recounted Kashkin's version in the narrative of Nina Berberova's documentary-publicist book ("he was met at home by his wife, whom he told that he had been fishing with fishermen and had fallen into the water").

Andrei Budyakovsky had no doubts about the reality of the situation described by Kashkin, and in his book The Life of Pyotr Ilyich Tchaikovsky (2003), he cited a little-known fact as proof. On the manuscript of the sketches for the Fourth Symphony, Tchaikovsky wrote: "In the event of my death I entrust this notebook to N. F. von Meck". Budyakovsky pointed out that in the capital in 1877, there were rumors of Tchaikovsky's insanity, and some newspapers even printed a refutation of this gossip.

== In culture ==
=== Journalism and fiction ===
The Russian writer Nina Berberova's book Tchaikovsky, published in emigration in 1937, contains a detailed description of the composer's suicide attempt. She added details to Kashkin's account that were missing or even contradictory: "The rain is pouring down... There are lights on the other side of the river, a coachman's carriage rattles somewhere". After a suicide attempt, Tchaikovsky returns to Miliukova in Berberova, and "Antonina Ivanovna ordered Alyosha to undress him and put him to bed. In the writer's book, Tchaikovsky falls ill, "but in the morning the fever was gone, even the doctor did not need to be called". The music publicist Solomon Volkov also had no doubts about the composer's suicide attempt. In 1990, a book was published by Boris Nikitin, a shipbuilding engineer by training who devoted most of his life to writing biographies of Russian musicians, Tchaikovsky. Old and New. The narrative in the book begins with the chapter "Shock", in which he describes the events of 1877. The publicist dated the suicide attempt to September 15-20 and based his description on Kashkin's memoirs. He considered this event the key in the composer's work and divided it into two periods—before and after the internal crisis of 1877: "In one of them he became a dramatist of other people's lives and a singer of beauty, continuing to write operas, ballets, romances, concertos and suites, into which he also poured his soul and cultivated them with great love. In the second, he created his own drama. This included all of his innermost being".

=== In movies ===
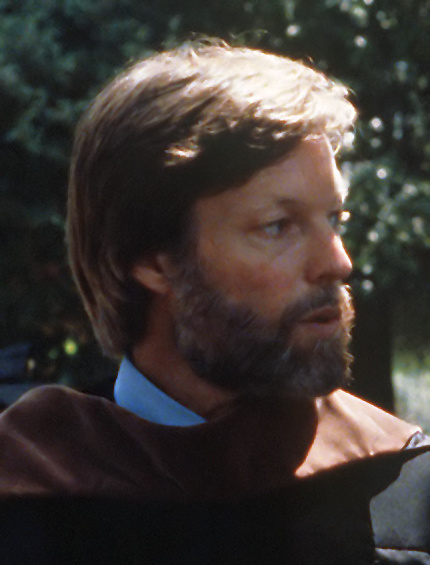
Richard Chamberlain in 1982.

In 1969, the Moscow Order of Lenin film studio Mosfilm completed the shooting of the two-part feature film Tchaikovsky, directed by Igor Talankin. The movie premiered on August 31, 1970. In the finale of the first episode, late at night, a rather drunken Tchaikovsky (Innokenty Smoktunovsky) follows a mysterious carriage without a driver on the outskirts of Moscow. The carriage takes him to a small wooden bridge. The composer descends to the water at its wooden pier and enters the water chest-deep. Aleksei Sofronov (Yevgeny Leonov), a faithful servant, runs across the bridge to help his master. The servant brings Tchaikovsky, who is losing strength, to Nikolai Rubinstein's apartment, whispering: "Ah, how bad! God will judge!" and "I didn't make it, you fool!" Rubinstein (Vladislav Strzelchik) comes out of the inner rooms in his robe. Tchaikovsky falls into his arms, saying, "I won't go there [a gala reception in honor of the composer, attended by Antonina Miliukova]!" Rubinstein said to Sofronov: "Run to the doctor!" The American music critic Charles P. Mitchell devoted one of the chapters of his book Great Composers Captured in Films from 1913 to 2002 to the analysis of films about Tchaikovsky made until the beginning of the 21st century. He even called the depiction of Tchaikovsky's relationship with his wife and the interpretation of Miliukova's image as a flirtatious coquette in the Soviet film Tchaikovsky genius and considered it the climax of the film, but he did not analyze the suicide attempt scene itself, which is included in this very episode.

In British director Ken Russell's The Music Lovers (1971), Richard Chamberlain played the role of Tchaikovsky. The director himself said: "'The Music Lovers' is not so much about the man as it is about the idea of the destructive influence of fantasy on people's lives. Like most artists, Tchaikovsky was able to sublimate personal problems into his art... Tchaikovsky put all his problems into music and thought they would go away and everything would be solved. This... destroyed the people he met, like his sister and Nina [Antonina Miliukova — the composer's wife], because they were real and their problems were real. There was no escape for them from [his] musical dreams". James Krukones, author of an article on the film in Tchaikovsky and His Contemporaries (1999), wrote: "'Music Lovers' is more about Ken Russell than Pyotr Ilyich Tchaikovsky; the film does not so much try to recreate history as reinterpret it, and in a very subjective way".

External videos
- | Tchaikovsky's attempted suicide in the movie Music Lovers (1971)
- | Tchaikovsky's suicide attempt in the movie Tchaikovsky (1969)

In one scene of the movie, the composer enters the river near the Stone Bridge (in the movie, it is short and low). Tchaikovsky seems confused as the water barely reaches his knees, even though he is almost in the middle of the river. He becomes even more lost when a charming young woman appears on the riverbank, walking a small dog. The woman looks in the composer's direction with a smile, and Tchaikovsky, embarrassed by her gaze, begins to climb ashore. The scene is filmed without a single word. It is accompanied by the sound of the String Quartet No. 3 in E-flat minor, which Tchaikovsky wrote in February 1876 and dedicated to the memory of the Czech violinist Ferdinand Laub, who had died shortly before. Russian film critic Alexei Gusev wrote of the film: "The Music Lovers appears to anyone unfamiliar with Tchaikovsky's true biography as an outrageous (or charmingly willful) parody. It is in the most egregious moments of the movie that Russell seems to sacrifice elementary decency, at least an accurate summary of real, documented facts, for the sake of red words". The critic describes the suicide attempt scene as follows:

Tchaikovsky is about to commit suicide and throws himself [in the movie he steps into the river] into the pond (in the movie it is a river, not a pond), but the water is knee-deep, and the hero stands there for all to see, pitiful, ridiculous, and humiliated—this episode reads like a vivid metaphor, a shamelessly catchy symbolism. Until you come across a detailed, one-to-one description of Russell's mise-en-scène in the composer's own diary [this scene does not appear in Tchaikovsky's diaries]. (Alexei Gusev. Ken's movie)

== Bibliography ==
=== Sources ===
- Давыдов, Ю. Л. (1962). П. И. Чайковский и семья Давыдовых // Записки о П. И. Чайковском (in Russian). М.: Государственное музыкальное издательство. pp. 3–43.
- Кашкин, Н. Д. (1954). Воспоминания о П. И. Чайковском. Общая редакция, вступительная статья и примечания С. И. Шлифштейна. Русская классическая музыкальная критика (in Russian). М.: Государственное музыкальное издательство. p. 225.
- Кашкин, Н. Д. (1920). Из воспоминаний о П. И. Чайковском // Прошлое русской музыки. Материалы и исследования (in Russian). Vol. 1. П. И. Чайковский. Петроград: Огни. pp. 99–132.
- Клименко, И. А. (1909). Пётр Ильич Чайковский. Краткий биографический очерк (in Russian). М.—СПб.: Печатня С. П. Яковлева. p. 35.
- Чайковский, М. И. (1997). Жизнь Петра Ильича Чайковского (по документам, хранившимся в архиве в Клину) в 3-х томах. Гений в искусстве (in Russian). Vol. 2. М.: Алгоритм. p. 607. ISBN 5-88878-007-3
- Neitzel, O. (1890). Die Russische Musik und ihr berufenster Vertreter (нем.) // Nord und Süd (PDF) (in German). pp. 56–71.

=== Researches and non-fiction sources ===
- Агеева, З. М. (2019). "Ch. 5. Женитьба". Чайковский. Гений и страдание (in Russian). М.: Алгоритм. pp. 25—34 (FB2). ISBN 978-5-9072-1183-4.
- Альшванг, А. А. (1970). "Ch. 7. 70-е годы в Москве". П. И. Чайковский. Классики мировой музыкальной культуры (in Russian). М.: Музыка. pp. 189–215.
- Будяковский, А. Е. (2003). "Ch. VI. Перемена в образе жизни. 1877". Жизнь Петра Ильича Чайковского (in Russian). СПб.: КультИнформПресс. pp. 131–146. ISBN 5-8392-0229-0
- Вайдман, П. Е. (2003). Биографии Чайковского в отечественной музыкальной историографии XIX—XX веков // Петербургский музыкальный архив. Сборник статей (in Russian). Vol. 4. Чайковский. Новые документы и материалы. СПб.: Композитор. pp. 34–55. ISBN 5-7379-0215-3
- Глебов, И. (1954). Наш долг // Кашкин Н. Д.. Воспоминания о П. И. Чайковском. Общая редакция, вступительная статья и примечания С. И. Шлифштейна. Русская классическая музыкальная критика (in Russian). М.: Государственное музыкальное издательство. pp. 7–14.
- Глебов, И. (1922). Чайковский (опыт характеристика) (in Russian). Пг.: Светозар. p. 56.
- Глущенко, Г. С. (1974). Творческий путь Н. Д. Кашкина // Н. Д. Кашкин. Исследование. Rossica (in Russian). М.: Музыка. pp. 9–84.
- Гусев, А. (2011). Кино Кена. Сеанс: Журнал.
- Клейн, Л. С. (2000). "Ch II. Гомосексуальная личность: натура и культура. 2. Бегство от любви". Другая любовь: природа человека и гомосексуальность (in Russian). СПб.: Фолио-Пресс. pp. 149–161. ISBN 5-7627-0146-8
- Кон, И. С. (2010). "Ch. 7. Однополая любовь. Предпочтения и склонности". Клубничка на берёзке: сексуальная культура в России. Диалог (in Russian). М.: Время. pp. 162–167. ISBN 978-5-9691-0554-6.
- Кон, И. С. (2003). "2-8. В родных пенатах. П. И. Чайковский". Лики и маски однополой любви. Лунный свет на заре. 3-е изд., перераб. и доп (in Russian). М.: Олимп, АСТ. pp. 332–334. ISBN 5-17-015194-2
- Конисская, Л. М. (1974). Без творчества нет жизни // Чайковский в Петербурге. 2-е изд., переработанное и дополненное (in Russian). Л.: Лениздат. pp. 109–147.
- Кремлёв, Ю. А. (1955). "Четвертая симфония". Симфонии П. И. Чайковского (PDF) (in Russian). М.: Госмузиздат. pp. 146–188.
- Кунин, И. Ф. (1958). "Ch. IХ. В 1977 году". Пётр Ильич Чайковский. Жизнь замечательных людей, том 265 (in Russian). М.: Молодая гвардия, 1958. — С. 190—202. — 365 с. — (Жизнь замечательных людей (Том 265)). — 75 000 экз. pp. 190–202.
- Орлова, А. (1987). Тайна жизни и смерти Чайковского (in Russian). Континент: Журнал. pp. 311–336.
- Охалова, И. В. (2015). "Последние годы". Пётр Ильич Чайковский. Школьная библиотека (in Russian). М.: ГАММА-Пресс. pp. 133–198. ISBN 978-5-9612-0055-3.
- Петухова, С. А. (2014). Библиография жизни и творчества П. И. Чайковского. Указатель литературы, вышедшей на русском языке за 140 лет 1866—2006 (PDF) (in Russian). М.: Государственный институт искусствознания. p. 856. ISBN 978-5-9828-7081-0.
- Побережная, Г. И. (1994). "Ch. 3 В Москве". Пётр Ильич Чайковский (in Russian). Киев: Рос. мовою. pp. 61–130. ISBN 5-8238-0156-4
- Познанский, А. Н. (2011). "Ch. 7. Побег из Москвы (1877)". Чайковский в Петербурге (in Russian). СПб.: Композитор. ISBN 978-5-7379-0445-6.
- Познанский, А. Н. (2007). Смерть Чайковского. Легенды и факты (in Russian). СПб.: Композитор. p. 254. ISBN 978-5-7379-0361-9.
- Познанский, А. Н. (1993). "Ch. III. Дамоклов меч / Ch. V. Заговор правоведов". Самоубийство Чайковского. Миф и реальность (in Russian) (М. ed.). Глагол. pp. 42–60 / 72–89. ISBN 5-8753-2019-2
- Познанский, А. Н. (2009). "Ch. 13. Сентябрьский тупик". Пётр Чайковский. Биография. Жизнеописания (in Russian). Vol. 1. СПб.: Вита Нова. pp. 471–504. ISBN 978-5-9389-8229-1.
- Прибегина, Г. А. (1983). "Пойду своим путём…". Пётр Ильич Чайковский. Русские и советские композиторы. Библиотечная серия (in Russian). М.: Музыка. pp. 72–92.
- Ручьевская, Е. А. (1978). "Переломный год". Пётр Ильич Чайковский. Краткий очерк жизни и творчества. 2-е изд., перераб (in Russian). Л.: Музыка. pp. 45–67.
- Сидельников, Л. С. (1992). П. И. Чайковский. Жизнь в искусстве (in Russian). М.: Искусство. p. 352. ISBN 5-2100-2306-0
- Соколов, В. С. (1994). Антонина Чайковская. История забытой жизни (in Russian). М.: Музыка. p. 295. ISBN 978-5-7140-0565-7. ISBN 5-7140-0565-1
- Туманина, Н. В. (1962). "Завершение московского периода жизни и творчества". П. И. Чайковский. Vol. V. 2. Путь к мастерству. 1840—1877. М.: Издательство Академии наук СССР. pp. 389–398.
- Холодковский, В. В. (1962). "На распутье". Дом в Клину. 3-е издание (in Russian). М.: Московский рабочий. pp. 33–38.
- Чайковский, М. И. (1982). Музыкальная энциклопедия [в 6 томах] / Гл. ред. Ю. В. Келдыш (in Russian). Vol. V. 6. Хейнце — Яшугин. М.: Советская энциклопедия, Советский композитор. p. 171.
- Шлифштейн, С. И. (1954). Вступительная статья / Примечания // Кашкин Н. Д.. Воспоминания о П. И. Чайковском. Общая редакция, вступительная статья и примечания С. И. Шлифштейна. Русская классическая музыкальная критика (in Russian). М.: Государственное музыкальное издательство. pp. 3–6 / 187–225.
- Baxter, J. (1973). An appalling talent: Ken Russell. Русские биографии. London: Mikhael Joseph LTD. p. 240. ISBN 978-0-7181-1075-8. ISBN 0-7181-1075-7
- Biancolli, L. (1944). Tschaikowsky and His Orchestral Music. New York: The Philharmonic-Symphony Society of New York. p. 56.
- Brown, D. (2009). "Ch. 12: Two Women: Marriage / Ch. 13. Two Masterpieces: Fourth Symphony and Eugene Onegin". Tchaikovsky. The Man and his Music. New York: Pegasus Books. pp. 137–147 / 147–173. ISBN 978-1605-9801-71.
- Krukones, J. H. (1999). "Exploding the Romantic Myth: Ken Russell's The Music Lovers". Tchaikovsky and His Contemporaries: A Centennial Symphosium [1 ed.]. Contributions to the study of music and dance, no. 49. Westport, Conn: Greenwood Press. pp. 251–262. ISBN 978-0-313-30825-3. ISBN 0-313-30825-X
- Mitchell, C. P. (2010). "Peter Ilyich Tchaikovsky". The Great Composers Portrayed on Film, 1913 through 2002. Jefferson NC: McFarland. pp. 252–263. ISBN 978-0786-4458-68.
- Poznansky, A. (1998). "Tchaikovsky: A Life Reconsidered". Tchaikovsky and His World. The Bard Music Festival, book 35. Princeton: Princeton University Press. pp. 3–54. ISBN 0-691-00430-7
- Wiley, R. J. (2009). "1877. The Year of Tchaikovsky's Marriage". Tchaikovsky. Oxford: Oxford University Press. pp. 146–163. ISBN 978-0195-3689-25.

=== Guides ===
- Надеждин, Б. М. (1979). Мосты Москвы (in Russian). М.: Московский рабочий. p. 192.
- Сытин, П. В. (1958). Из истории московских улиц (in Russian). М.: Московский рабочий. p. 845.
- Щусев, П. В. (1953). Мосты и их архитектура (in Russian). М.: Государственное издательство литературы по строительству и архитектуре. p. 360.

=== Journalism and fiction ===
- Берберова, Н. Н. (1997). Чайковский. Биография (in Russian). СПб.: Лимбус Пресс. p. 256. ISBN 978-5-8370-0361-5. ISBN 5-8370-0361-4
- Волков, С. М. (2015). «Страсти по Чайковскому». Разговоры с Джорджем Баланчиным // Чайковский (сборник биографической прозы). Rossica (in Russian). М.: Libra Press. pp. 227–385. ISBN 5-1702-1655-6
- Никитин, Б. С. (1990). Потрясение // Чайковский. Старое и новое (in Russian). М.: Знание. pp. 1–2. ISBN 5-07-000670-3
