= Odin Biron =

American actor (born 1984)

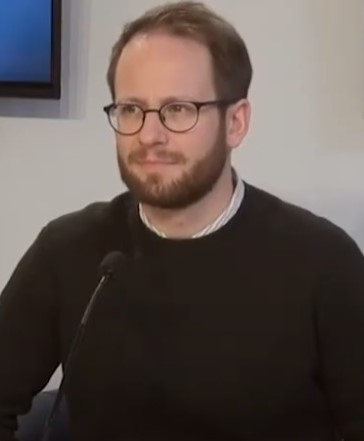
- Born: Odin Lund Biron; October 5, 1984 (age 41); Duluth, Minnesota, U.S.
- Occupation: Actor
- Years active: 2009–present
- Notable work: Interns; Tchaikovsky's Wife

Odin Lund Biron (born October 5, 1984) is an American actor, best-known for his work in Russia, where he played the character Dr Phil Richards in the popular medical sitcom, Interns and the lead role of Pyotr Ilyich Tchaikovsky in Kirill Serebrennikov's feature film Tchaikovsky's Wife (2022).

== Biography ==
Born in Duluth, Minnesota, Biron grew up nearby in rural Minnesota, moving to Ann Arbor, Michigan, with his mother after his parents' divorce. While studying at the University of Michigan, he studied at the Moscow Art Theatre School on student exchange and was, unusually, invited to stay and join the incoming Russian class. He has spoken about having had a romantic image of Russia, having known very little Russian on arrival; being less able to communicate with other Russians, he focused on studying. In one of his final student roles, he won an award for his portrayal of Hamlet in a production that toured to New York's Baryshnikov Arts Center; he drew the attention of the Gogol Center and plaudits from Viktor Ryzhakov, artistic director of the Meyerhold Center and one of his former instructors.

Landing a role in Interns in 2011, a top-rated Russian medical sitcom, raised Biron's profile substantially and he has spoken about being recognised in nightclubs and avoiding "celebrity events" as a result. In a country where a large majority of the population view the United States "badly" or "very badly", Biron is one of a few Americans in the public eye, yet the success of Interns has led to Biron being considered a heartthrob and very popular.

Biron came out to his parents as a teenager and made no big secret of his homosexuality, but Russia is very socially conservative on LGBT rights, with hostility towards legal recognition of same-sex marriage and support for laws discriminating against LGBT people. The United States Department of State repeatedly raised concerns around LGBT civil rights in their 2014 Country Reports on Human Rights Practices. His character on Interns was raised by two gay fathers, though the treatment of the issue of sexuality on the show has been described as reinforcing the Soviet idea that homosexuality is a product of Western moral decay, rather than being used to promote more liberal values.

It is very common for LGBT performers in Russia to avoid coming out, with an unspoken don't ask, don't tell arrangement between the entertainment industry and the mainstream press. After the passage of 2013's Russian LGBT propaganda law, Biron's Interns co-star and former Orthodox priest Ivan Okhlobystin made international news with genocidally homophobic remarks made in a December 2013 talk in Novosibirsk, leading Biron to consider leaving the show and Russian TV altogether. As a result, he came out in an interview with New York magazine in early 2015, to mixed reactions, reported in the Russian press accompanied by mentions of Okhlobystin's remarks. After an initial reaction leaving Biron with "a sense of physical danger, political danger", he initially left Russia. He returned later without any apparent negative effect on his career, though his friendship with Okhlobystin had become untenable after the former priest's reaction describing him as a "pervert" and a "sodomite".

Biron lived in Moscow with his boyfriend, a Kazakh film director, and has a brother who lives in Arlington, VA, while his mother lives in New Zealand. In an interview with Minnesota's Star Tribune in May 2015, however, he mentioned that he was back in the United States permanently and, as well as acting, was pursuing a Le Cordon Bleu culinary degree.

From 2016 to 2022, he lived in Moscow and worked at the Gogol Center. Since 2022, he has lived in Berlin.

== Awards and nominations ==
- Named as a Best Actor in the 2009 Golden List while at Moscow Art Theatre, for his role as the title character in Shakespeare's tragedy Hamlet.

== Filmography ==
=== Film ===
Year	Title	Role	Notes
2009	Rokery		
2013	Dumplings	Alex	
2014	Spiral	Sasha, Yakob's assistant	
2015	12 Months: A New Fairy Tale	Iyul	
2017	Maximum Impact	P.B. Floyd	
2022	Tchaikovsky's Wife	Pyotr Tchaikovsky	
2022	Petrópolis	Philip Graham	
2024	Limonov: The Ballad	Ethan	

=== Television ===
Year	Title	Role	Notes
2010	Ivan the Terrible	The English ambassador	
2010	Capital of sin	Prince Max	
2011—2016	Interns	Phil Richards	67th series
2019	Gold Diggers	Vasiliy	
2020	Optimists 2	Phillip Bradley	
2022	Karamora	Journalist	
2022	The Last Minister	Edward Snowden	Episode: "Citizen X"
