= Minotaur (2026 film) =

2026 film by Andrey Zvyagintsev

- International promotional poster
- Russian: Минотавр
- Directed by: Andrey Zvyagintsev
- Screenplay by: Simon Lyashenko; Andrey Zvyagintsev
- Based on: The Unfaithful Wife by: Claude Chabrol; Sauro Scavolini
- Produced by: Nathanaël Karmitz; Charles Gillibert; Marco Perego; Andrey Zvyagintsev; Elisha Karmitz; Gerhard Meixner; Roman Paul; Christiane Sommer
- Starring: Dmitriy Mazurov; Iris Lebedeva; Boris Kudrin; Yuriy Zavalnyouk; Varvara Shmykova
- Cinematography: Mikhail Krichman
- Edited by: Andrey Zvyagintsev
- Music by: Evgueni Galperine; Sacha Galperine
- Production companies: MK Productions; CG Cinéma; Forma Pro Films; Razor Film Produktion; Arte France Cinéma; ZDF Studios; LEAF Entertainment
- Distributed by: Les Films du Losange (France); Mubi (Germany)
- Release dates: 19 May 2026 (Cannes); 14 October 2026 (France); 5 November 2026 (Germany)
- Running time: 142 minutes
- Countries: France; Germany; Latvia
- Language: Russian
- Budget: $7.5 million
- Box office: $1 million

Minotaur (Russian: Минотавр) is a 2026 political thriller drama film directed and edited by Russian filmmaker Andrey Zvyagintsev, from a screenplay co-written with Simon Lyashenko and based on the 1969 French film The Unfaithful Wife by Claude Chabrol. An international co-production of French, German, and Latvian companies, set against the backdrop of the Russo-Ukrainian war, it follows broken business executive Gleb (Dmitriy Mazurov), as he discovers his wife Galina (Iris Lebedeva) has been unfaithful.

The film had its world premiere in the main competition of the 79th Cannes Film Festival on 19 May 2026, where it won the Grand Prix and Cannes Soundtrack Award. It was met with critical acclaim, and was theatrically released in France by Les Films du Losange on 14 October.

It was also selected as the French entry for the Best International Feature Film at the 99th Academy Awards.

== Premise ==
Set against the backdrop of a small provincial Russian town in 2022, it follows business executive Gleb, who is being coerced by his local government into sending several of his employees to serve on the front lines of the Russo-Ukrainian war when he discovers his wife is having an affair.

== Cast ==
- Dmitriy Mazurov as Gleb
- Iris Lebedeva as Galina
- Boris Kudrin as Seryozha
- Yuriy Zavalnyouk as Anton
- Varvara Shmykova as Natasha
- Vladimir Friedman as the Mayor
- Stacy Tolstoy as Julia
- Mihails Samodahovs as Nikolai
- Mikhail Safronov as Mikhail
- Anastasia Mischenko as Dasha
- Volodymyr Gorislavets as Detective Semyonov
- Rudgy Pajany as Adrien
- Alex Sino as Andrei Borisovich
- Elena Bogdanovich-Golubeva
- Anatoliy Beliy
- Artur Smolyaninov
- Kristina Zakharova
- Juris Žagars

== Production ==
=== Development ===
Following a long battle against COVID-19, Andrey Zvyagintsev moved from Moscow to France in 2022, where development began for a project about a Russian oligarch, initially titled Jupiter. By early 2025, pre-production officially began after the film secured financing.

Minotaur is a co-production between France, Latvia and Germany, produced by MK Production (the production arm of mk2 Films), Charles Gillibert's CG Cinéma and Zvyagintsev, in association with Arte France Cinéma and Leaf Entertainment, with Germany's Razor Film and Latvia's Forma Pro Films co-producing.

Co-written by Zvyagintsev and Simon Lyashenko, it is loosely based on the French thriller film The Unfaithful Wife (1969), directed by Claude Chabrol, which was also adapted into Adrian Lyne's Unfaithful (2002).

Set against the backdrop of the Russo-Ukrainian war, it incorporates the societal upheaval caused by the Russian military mobilization. Zvyagintsev based part of the script on a personal friend from a provincial town, who was summoned alongside other businessmen to decide which of their employees should be sent to the front.

=== Filming ===
Principal photography began in September 2025 in Riga, Latvia. Production wrapped by late November 2025. Zvyagintsev re-teamed with his longtime partners, cinematographer Mikhail Krichman, sound designer Andrei Dergatchev and production designers Andrey Ponkratov and Masha Slavina.

== Release ==
In March 2026, it was reported that Mubi had acquired distribution rights for North and Latin America, the UK, Ireland, Germany, Austria and Switzerland, with mk2 Films handling sales elsewhere. Falcon Pictures acquired Indonesian rights to the film.

The film had its world premiere in the main competition of the 79th Cannes Film Festival on 19 May 2026, where it won the Grand Prix and Cannes Soundtrack Award. During the closing ceremony of the festival, Zvyagintsev demanded Russia's president Vladimir Putin to end “the butchery”, adding: "The only person who can stop this carnage is the President of the Russian Federation. Put an end to this slaughter; the whole world is waiting for it".

It won the Sydney Film Prize at the 73rd Sydney Film Festival, with the Kleber Mendonça Filho-led jury hailing it as a "chronicle of contemporary Russia" that felt "strongly Hitchcockian, strongly cinematic". It was screened at the Coca-Cola Open Air Cinema at the 32nd Sarajevo Film Festival, in the Open Air section on 21 August 2026. It had its North American premiere at 53rd Telluride Film Festival, and was also selected for the Main Slate of the 2026 New York Film Festival.

It was theatrically released in France by Les Films du Losange on 14 October, and in Germany by Mubi on 5 November.

== Reception ==
=== Critical response ===
On the review aggregator website Rotten Tomatoes, 96% of 67 critics' reviews are positive, with an average rating of 8.3/10. Metacritic, which uses a weighted average, assigned the film a score of 90 out of 100, based on 23 critics, indicating "universal acclaim".

In his five-star review, Peter Bradshaw of The Guardian called Minotaur "tremendous", specifically commending Zvyagintsev's direction as "superb" and Mazurov and Lebedeva's performances as "outstanding". Godfrey Cheshire, writing for RogerEbert.com, gave the film 4 out of 4 stars and said that the film had "the surface elegance and emotional depth of classics". In a positive review for Variety, Guy Lodge wrote, "Teeming with rage, despair, and darkest gallows humor, "Minotaur" is very much up to the task."

=== Russian government response ===
On 18 September 2026, Zvyagintsev was added to the Russian list of foreign agents.

=== Accolades ===
The film was one of five shortlisted by the Centre national du cinéma et de l'image animée and was one of eleven shortlisted by German Films to be France's and Germany's submission to the 99th Academy Awards for Best International Feature Film respectively. Minotaur ultimately selected as the French entry for the Best International Feature Film at the 99th Academy Awards by 16 September 2026.

Award	Date of ceremony	Category	Recipient(s)	Result	Ref.
Cannes Film Festival	23 May 2026	Palme d'Or	Andrey Zvyagintsev	Nominated	
Cannes Film Festival	23 May 2026	Grand Prix	Andrey Zvyagintsev	Won	
Cannes Film Festival	23 May 2026	Cannes Soundtrack Award	Evgueni Galperine, Sacha Galperine	Won	
Sydney Film Festival	14 June 2026	Sydney Film Prize	Andrey Zvyagintsev	Won	
Camerimage	14 November 2026	Golden Frog	Mikhail Krichman	Nominated	
Camerimage	14 November 2026	Bronze Frog	Mikhail Krichman	Won	
Gotham Independent Film Awards	30 November 2026	Best International Feature	Andrey Zvyagintsev, Charles Gillibert, Nathanaël Karmitz, Marco Perego	Pending	
Gotham Independent Film Awards	30 November 2026	Best Director	Andrey Zvyagintsev	Pending	
Gotham Independent Film Awards	30 November 2026	Best Adapted Screenplay	Simon Lyashenko, Andrey Zvyagintsev	Pending	
European Film Awards	16 January 2027	Best European Director	Andrey Zvyagintsev	Pending	
European Film Awards	16 January 2027	Best European Screenwriter	Simon Lyashenko, Andrey Zvyagintsev	Pending	

== See also ==
- List of submissions to the 99th Academy Awards for Best International Feature Film
- List of French submissions for the Academy Award for Best International Feature Film
