= Tchaikovsky's Wife =

- Russian promotional poster
- Russian: Жена Чайковского
- Directed by: Kirill Serebrennikov
- Written by: Kirill Serebrennikov
- Produced by: Ilya Stewart; Carole Baraton; Yohann Comte; Mike Goodridge; Pierre Mazars
- Starring: Alyona Mikhaylova; Odin Biron; Yuliya Aug; Miron Fyodorov; Alexander Gorchilin; Filipp Avdeyev
- Cinematography: Vladislav Opelyants
- Edited by: Yuri Karikh
- Music by: Daniil Orlov
- Production companies: Charades; Hype Film; Logical Pictures; Bord Cadre Films; Kinoprime Foundation
- Release date: 18 May 2022 (Cannes)
- Running time: 145 minutes
- Countries: Russia; France; Switzerland
- Language: Russian

Tchaikovsky's Wife (Russian: Жена Чайковского, romanized: Zhena Chaikovskogo) is a 2022 biographical drama film written and directed by Kirill Serebrennikov, who had been criticised as a dissident in Russia. Starring Alyona Mikhaylova and Odin Biron, it follows the marriage of convenience of young, naive Antonina Miliukova to noted composer Pyotr Ilyich Tchaikovsky.

The film had its world premiere at the main competition of the 2022 Cannes Film Festival on 18 May, where it competed for the Palme d'Or. It received mixed reviews, but critics praised Mikhaylova's performance.

== Premise ==
Set in the Russian Empire during the second half of the 19th century, the film is about Antonina Miliukova, the wife of the composer Pyotr Ilyich Tchaikovsky. Antonina cannot accept her husband's homosexuality and as a result, gradually loses her mind.

== Cast ==
- Alyona Mikhaylova as Antonina Miliukova, Tchaikovsky's wife
- Odin Biron as Pyotr Ilyich Tchaikovsky
- Yuliya Aug as a crazy old woman
- Miron Fyodorov as Nikolai Rubinstein
- Alexander Gorchilin as Anatoliy Brandukov
- Filipp Avdeyev as a Modest Ilyich Tchaikovsky and Anatoly Ilyich Tchaikovsky
- Varvara Shmykova as Alexandra, Tchaikovsky's sister
- Vladimir Mishukov as Shlykov, Antonina's attorney
- Andrey Burkovsky as Prince Vladimir Meshchersky
- Ekaterina Ermishina as Liza, Antonina's sister
- Viktor Khorinyak as Peter Jurgenson

== Release ==
The film was presented at the 75th Cannes Film Festival's main competition on 18 May 2022 (Day 2). It was the only Russian film selected to the festival.

In the context of the ongoing Russian invasion of Ukraine, European Film Academy president Agnieszka Holland criticised the decision to screen a Russian film at the Cannes' main competition. She noted that Serebrennikov "used [the film's festival press conference] to praise a Russian oligarch and compare the tragedy of Russian soldiers to Ukrainian defenders. I would not give him such a chance at this very moment".

But Serebrennikov openly condemned the war and argued for freedom for arts and culture. As a result, all his productions in his home country were cancelled, including his ballet about Rudolph Nureyev at the Bolshoi, first performed in 2017.

This film was Serebrennikov's last Russian production. He has lived in exile in Germany ever since.

== Reception ==
Film critic Zinaida Pronchenko negatively assessed the film: "One continuous ridiculous metaphor of the Russian world". In contrast, Peter Bradshaw from The Guardian praised the film as far superior to Serebrennikov's previous Petrov's Flu. He praised Alyona Mikhailova's performance as tremendous.

Tchaikovsky's Wife has an approval rating of 85% on review aggregator website Rotten Tomatoes, based on 33 reviews, and an average rating of 6.6/10. The website's critical consensus states: "If at times opaquely and certainly prolongedly, Tchaikovski's Wife elegantly captures a heartbroken woman's obsession with her prominent spouse who struggled with his own censured sexuality". Metacritic assigned the film a weighted average score of 50 out of 100, based on 10 critics, indicating "mixed or average reviews".

== See also ==
- List of Russian films of 2022
