= Symphony No. 2 (Tchaikovsky) =

Symphony by Pyotr Ilyich Tchaikovsky

- Little Russian
- by Pyotr Ilyich Tchaikovsky
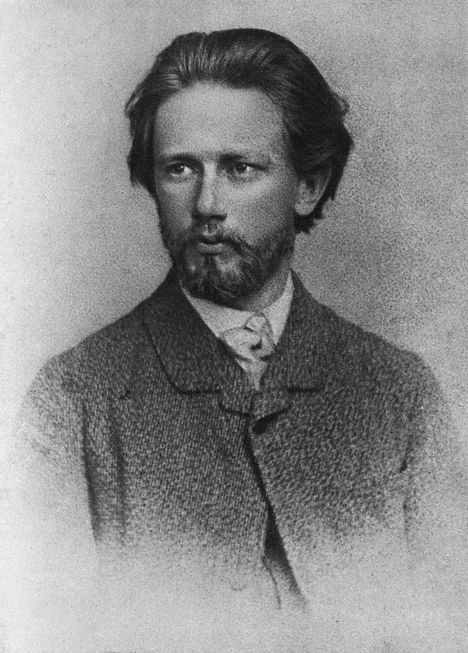
- Tchaikovsky in 1874
- Key: C minor
- Opus: 17
- Composed: 1872
- Duration: About 35 minutes
- Movements: Four
- Scoring: Orchestra

Premiere
- Date: 7 February 1872
- Location: Moscow
- Conductor: Nikolai Rubinstein

The Symphony No. 2 in C minor, Op. 17 by Pyotr Ilyich Tchaikovsky was composed in 1872. One of Tchaikovsky's joyful compositions, it was successful right from its premiere and also won the favor of the group of nationalistic Russian composers known as "The Five", led by Mily Balakirev.

Because Tchaikovsky used three Ukrainian folk songs to great effect in this symphony, it was nicknamed the "Little Russian" (Russian: Малороссийская, Malorossiyskaya) by Nikolay Kashkin, a friend of the composer as well as a well-known musical critic in Moscow. Ukraine was at that time frequently called "Little Russia". According to historian Harlow Robinson, "Kashkin suggested the moniker in his 1896 book Memories of Tchaikovsky."

Despite its initial success, Tchaikovsky was not satisfied with the symphony. He revised the work extensively in 1879–80, substantially rewriting the opening movement and shortening the finale. This revision is the version of the symphony usually performed today, although there have also been supporters of the original version. Among those advocates was the composer's friend and former student, Sergei Taneyev, who was himself a noted composer and pedagogue.

== Music ==
The symphony is scored for piccolo, two flutes, two oboes, two clarinets, two bassoons, four horns, two trumpets, three trombones, tuba, timpani, cymbals, bass drum, tam-tam (last movement only), and strings.

The symphony has four movements:

1. Andante sostenuto – Allegro vivo (C minor)
2. Andantino marziale, quasi moderato (E♭ major)
3. Scherzo. Allegro molto vivace (C minor)
4. Finale. Moderato assai – Allegro vivo (C major)

=== I. Andante sostenuto – Allegro vivo ===
A solo horn playing a Ukrainian variant of "Down by Mother Volga" sets the atmosphere for this movement. Tchaikovsky reintroduces this song in the development section, and the horn sings it once more at the movement's conclusion.

The rather vigorous second subject utilises a melody which would also be used subsequently by Nikolai Rimsky-Korsakov in his Russian Easter Festival Overture. The end of the exposition, in the relative E♭ major, leads straight into the development, in which material from both themes is heard. A long pedal note leads back to the second subject. Tchaikovsky does not repeat the first subject theme in its entirety in this section, as is conventional, but instead uses it solely for the coda.

=== II. Andantino marziale, quasi moderato ===
This movement was originally a bridal march Tchaikovsky wrote for his unpublished opera Undine. He quotes the folk song "Spin, O My Spinner" in the central section.

=== III. Scherzo. Allegro molto vivace ===
Fleet and scampering, this movement does not quote an actual folk song but sounds folk song-like in its overall character. It takes the form of a da capo scherzo and trio with a coda.

=== IV. Finale. Moderato assai – Allegro vivo ===
After a brief but expansive fanfare, Tchaikovsky quotes the folk song "The Crane", subjecting it to an increasingly intricate and colorful variations for orchestra. A more lyrical theme in A♭ major from the strings provides contrast. During the development both first and second themes are used. After the recapitulation, the symphony finishes with a colorful and lively coda.

== Overview ==
Tchaikovsky may not be a nationalist composer in the manner of the Russian composers known as "The Five" or "The Mighty Handful", but he retained a love for Russian folk song and Orthodox chant his entire life. His liturgical music includes a setting of the Liturgy of St. John Chrysostom and an All-Night Vigil which draw upon traditional chant. His affinity for folk song led him in 1868–69 to publish Fifty Russian Folksongs arranged for piano duet. All but one he transcribed himself came from the collections of Villebois and Balakirev.

=== Composition ===
Tchaikovsky wrote much of the Little Russian Symphony during his summer holiday at Kamianka (Kamenka) in Ukraine with his sister Aleksandra's family, the Davydovs. The Davydov estate had become the composer's favorite refuge. Alexandra had, in fact, encouraged the composer to make Kamenka his second home. His affection for the estate bore fruit in his using local songs in the symphony he was writing. He even once wrote, in jest, that true credit for the Little Russian's finale should have gone "to the real composer of the said work—Peter Gerasimovich." Gerasimovich, the elderly butler in the Davydov household, sang the folk-song "The Crane" to Tchaikovsky while the composer was working on the symphony.

One of Tchaikovsky's favorite anecdotes resulted from his nearly losing the sketches for the Little Russian on the way back to Moscow. To persuade a recalcitrant postmaster to hitch the horses to the coach in which he and his brother Modest had been travelling, Tchaikovsky presented himself as "Prince Volkonsky, gentleman of the Emperor's bedchamber." When they reached their evening stop, he noticed his luggage missing—including his work on the symphony. Fearing the postmaster had opened the luggage and learned his identity, he sent someone to fetch it. The intermediary returned empty-handed. The postmaster would only release the luggage to the prince himself. Steeling himself, Tchaikovsky returned. His luggage had not been opened, much to his relief. He made small talk for some time with the postmaster and eventually asked the postmaster's name. "Tchaikovsky", the postmaster replied. Stunned, the composer thought this was perhaps a sharp-witted revenge. Eventually he learned "Tchaikovsky" was really the postmaster's name. After learning this fact, he delighted in recounting the story.

=== Influence of Kamarinskaya ===
Tchaikovsky had used folk songs in his early days in Saint Petersburg and in his student overture The Storm. Now he wanted to use folk songs as valid symphonic material. Tchaikovsky's greatest debt in this regard was to Glinka's Kamarinskaya. He believed fervently that in Kamarinskaya lay the core of the entire school of Russian symphonic music, "just as the whole oak is in the acorn", as he wrote in his diary in 1888.

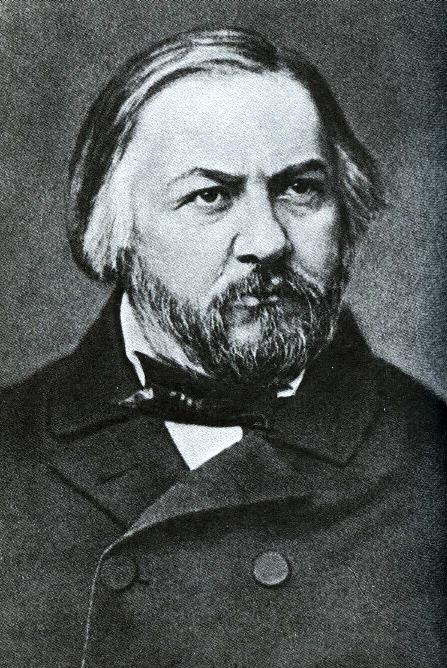
Glinka's Kamarinskaya helped Tchaikovsky in writing the Little Russian.

Kamarinskaya is based on two melodies. The first is a bridal song, "Izza gor" (From beyond the mountains). The second, the title song of the piece, is a naigrish, an instrumental dance to an ostinato melody repeated for as long as the dancers can keep up with it. Glinka uses the principle from folk song of allowing the musical structure to unfold around a thematic constant—or actually two constants, since he uses two folk songs. He varies the background material surrounding these songs more than the songs themselves—orchestral color (timbre), harmonization, counterpoint. This way, Glinka preserves the original character of the dance, complementing it with creative variations in the orchestral treatment.

Ideally, the themes in a Western piece interact, contrast and change. This activity fuels the composition's growth as an organic creation. Tension continues building as this thematic dialogue becomes increasingly complex. This dialogue or interchange eventually propels the piece to a climactic point of resolution. Kamarinskaya does not follow this pattern. Nor can it. The ostinato melody of the second song will not allow any motivic development without distorting the character of the piece. The music repeats itself constantly, albeit with changing backgrounds. Because of this lack of thematic growth, the music remains static, not moving forward. Nor was this a unique problem with Kamarinskaya. Russian music, especially Russian folk music, stubbornly refused to follow the Western principles Tchaikovsky had learned in St. Petersburg. This may have been one reason his teacher Anton Rubinstein did not consider folk songs to be viable musical material for anything other than local color.

For Tchaikovsky, Kamarinskaya offered a viable example of the creative possibilities of folk songs in a symphonic structure, using a variety of harmonic and contrapuntal combinations. It also offered a blueprint on how such a structure could be made to work, barring the potential for inertia or over-repetition. Because of his compositional training, Tchaikovsky could build the finale of the Little Russian more solidly and over a greater time scale than either Glinka or Mussorgsky could have done. Without Kamarinskaya, however, Tchaikovsky knew he did not have had a foundation upon which to build that finale.

=== Initial success ===
Tchaikovsky played the finale at a gathering at Rimsky-Korsakov's house in Saint Petersburg on January 7, 1873. To his brother Modest, he wrote, "[T]he whole company almost tore me to pieces with rapture—and Madame Rimskaya-Korsakova begged me in tears to let her arrange it for piano duet". Neither Balakirev nor Mussorgsky was present. Borodin was there and may have approved of the work himself. Also present was music critic Vladimir Stasov. Impressed by what he heard, Stasov asked Tchaikovsky what he would consider writing next. Stasov would soon influence the composer in writing the symphonic poem The Tempest and later, with Balakirev, the Manfred Symphony.

The premiere of the complete symphony took place in Moscow under Nikolai Rubinstein on February 7, 1873. Tchaikovsky wrote Stasov the next day that it "enjoyed a great success, so great that Rubinstein wants to perform it again ... as by public demand." That publicly demanded performance, on April 9, was even more successful. A third Moscow performance, again by public demand, took place on May 27. Critical reaction was just as enthusiastic. Stasov wrote of the finale "in terms of color, facture and humor ... one of the most important creations of the entire Russian school." Hermann Laroche, who had travelled from St. Petersburg especially for the concert, wrote in the Moscow Register on February 1, "Not in a long time have I come across a work with such a powerful thematic development of ideas and with contrasts that are so well motivated and artistically thought out."

Meanwhile, Eduard Nápravník conducted the St. Petersburg premiere on March 7. Despite a negative review by César Cui, the audience in Saint Petersburg received the piece positively enough to guarantee it a second performance the following season.

=== Revision ===
One person not happy with the Little Russian was its composer. In the same letter describing the 1873 premiere, Tchaikovsky wrote to Stasov, "To tell you the truth, I'm not completely satisfied with the first three movements, but 'The Crane' ['Zhuravel'] itself [the finale which employs this Russian folk tune] hasn't come out so badly." Despite this, Tchaikovsky persuaded the publisher Bessel to publish the score. Bessel released a piano duet arrangement (prepared by Tchaikovsky after Rimskaya-Korsakova had to withdraw due to illness) but was late to produce a full score.

In 1879, Tchaikovsky asked for the return of the manuscript score. Upon its arrival, he started revising it. On January 2, 1880, he sent Bessel a progress report: "1. I have composed the first movement afresh, leaving only the introduction and coda in their previous form. 2. I have rescored the second movement. 3. I've altered the third movement, shortening and rescoring it. 4. I've shortened the finale and rescored it." He claimed he had completed this work in three days. By January 16, he wrote Sergei Taneyev, "This movement [the first] has come out compressed, short, and is not difficult. If the epithet 'impossible' applies to anything, it is this first movement in its original form. My God! How difficult, noisy, disjointed and muddle-headed this is!" The premiere of the revised version was played at Saint Petersburg on February 12, 1881, under the direction of Karl Zike.

== Versions ==
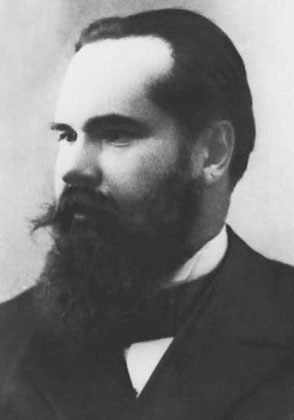
Sergey Taneyev

The 1880 revised version is usually the one performed and recorded today, but its true effectiveness has been questioned. At only 35 minutes running time (somewhat shorter than many symphonies of the period), it is also approximately five minutes shorter than its predecessor. Tchaikovsky stood by his revisions, informing Eduard Nápravník that the 1880 version was the only one to be performed. Eight years after Tchaikovsky's death, Sergei Taneyev compared the two versions and favored the 1872 original. Nikolay Kashkin's opinion was the same.

Taneyev's opinion carried considerable weight. In the 19 years between the première of the original Little Russian and his appraisal of both versions, Taneyev had not only developed into an outstanding teacher of composition but also earned a reputation as one of the finest craftsmen among all Russian composers. He felt strongly enough about the matter to write the composer's brother Modest, "It seems to me that in some future concert you ought to let people hear the real Second Symphony, in its original form ... When I see you I will play both versions and you will probably agree with me about the superiority of the first."

More recently, Hans Keller has advocated at least the occasional performance of the 1872 version. Dr. David Brown has added, "To be fair to the second version, it is certainly attractive, and structurally as clear as anything that Tchaikovsky could wish for. There is an undeniable heaviness in the original, but its imposing scale, and its richness of content and detail make it a far more impressive piece that ought to be restored to the place, which is still permanently usurped by its slighter and far less enterprising successor."

See Discussion section for a reference to the only recording of the original version of the work, made by Geoffrey Simon and the London Symphony Orchestra.

=== 1872 original ===
What endeared the Little Russian to The Five (or kuchka, as the group was also called) was not that Tchaikovsky used Ukrainian folk songs but, especially in the outer movements, how he allowed the unique characteristics of Russian folk song to dictate symphonic form. This was one of the goals toward which the kuchka strived. Tchaikovsky, with his Conservatory grounding, could sustain such development longer and more cohesively than his colleagues in the kuchka, but writing in this vein also had its pitfalls. Using similar intervals and phrases to the folk songs with repetitiveness typical of Russian folk music could easily create a static effect rather than one geared to movement and purpose. The melody tends, in fact, to become something near a set of variations on itself, to proceed by modulation rather than by development and contrast; and this clearly makes it recalcitrant to symphonic treatment. However, in 1872, Tchaikovsky did not see this lack of structural advancement as a problem since in all his most important symphonic movements to date his practice had been to close the first subject exactly where it had begun.

==== Andante sostenuto—Allegro vivo ====
The 1872 version of the first movement is massive in scale, intricate in structure and complex texturally. Its weightiness contrasted well with the comparatively lightweight second movement and it balanced the finale well—a formal pattern the composer would repeat much later in the Pathétique. From Romeo and Juliet he used the idea of integrating the introduction, based on another Ukrainian folk song, with the main body of the movement by using material from it in the allegro. The first subject itself is both spacious and filled with a restless momentum resulting from constant tensions between melody and bass. These tensions are often highlighted by the accompanying figures, which are syncopated. The second subject, like the first, is tonally restless, often chromatic and containing an almost constant contrapuntal interplay. While the exposition of these themes was limited in expressiveness, it was also rich in inventive detail and skillfully composed—what Dr. David Brown called "as monolithic a slab of symphonic music as Tchaikovsky had yet composed."

==== Finale. Moderato assai—Allegro vivo ====
The finale is both the high point of the symphony and its composer's clearest demonstration of writing in line with the tradition of Glinka as embraced by the Five. He introduces the folk song "The Crane" in a grandiose introduction similar to how Mussorgsky would write "The Great Gate of Kiev" for Pictures at an Exhibition two years later (although many recordings seem to rush through this imposing section, making the contrast between this and its impish second statement somewhat less stark). But the grandiosity is just a momentary mask. The mask drops with the first notes of the Allegro vivo. The music becomes both highly animated and mischievous in tone as Tchaikovsky allows "The Crane" to virtually monopolize the next two minutes, set against a succession of varying backdrops. Such a spacious development leaves almost no time for a transition to a calmer second theme; Tchaikovsky lets it arrive unannounced; the music just seems to stop with only a couple of brass notes to form the briefest of transitions. Even then, it is quickly replaced with more variations on "The Crane." The development is an unorthodox combination of these two themes accompanied by a series of widely striding bass notes, like some giant walking through the music's narrative. The second subject sometimes twists in mid-statement and even takes on the boisterous personality of "The Crane", building to a huge climax. In the 1872 version, the climax led to "The Crane" being recapitulated with an even more dizzying set of changing backgrounds, even going through remote key areas before returning to tonic for the second subject group. It is worth hearing the original version of this – the way he played it at the home of Rimsky-Korsakov – which caused a sensation.

=== 1880 revision ===
In the years following the Little Russian, Tchaikovsky's musical ideals changed considerably. He became attracted to the qualities of lightness and grace he found in 18th century classical music, as shown in his Variations on a Rococo Theme. He became increasingly attracted to French music. This attraction was strengthened by his exposure to Léo Delibes' Sylvia and Georges Bizet's Carmen. Against the musical values he heard in this music, the massive scale, intricate structure, and textural complexity of the Little Russian's first movement became distasteful.

==== Andante sostenuto—Allegro vivo ====
Tchaikovsky focused the majority of his revision on the first movement. The result was a completely new composition. The only parts he did not change were the introduction, coda and 28 bars of the development section. His objective was to clarify structure and texture. He compressed the material, excising more than 100 bars of music in the process. He introduced more abrupt contrasts in the material, which heightened the musical drama, allowed him to more sharply define structural divisions within the movement, and allowed the movement to follow a more orthodox sonata form.

Tchaikovsky also changed the thematic material, eliminating the second subject and replacing it with the original first subject after rewriting it completely, since there was little contrast between these two themes. The other thematic change was the role of the introduction's folk song in the main body of the movement. In 1872 it had operated freely within the main movement, sometimes operating on equal terms with the other themes and at others even assuming a brief structural role in a manner both bold and unprecedented. After reappearing to complete the exposition, it had continued as a constant element of the entire development section before falling back to allow the first theme to reassume its role. Also, while Tchaikovsky had not written a transition written into the exposition, he had provided one in the recapitulation by restarting the folk song in combination with part of the first subject.

In his revision, Tchaikovsky confines the introduction's folk tune to the first part of the development and the coda. The new second half of the development focused on the new first subject. The recapitulation was orthodox, the last three bars tonally modified for the second subject to be restated in the tonic.

==== Finale. Moderato assai—Allegro vivo ====
While Tchaikovsky left the inner movements alone, structurally speaking, he cut 150 bars out of the finale. Instead of the climax leading to further development of "The Crane", it is now followed by a quieter interlude led by the movement's second subject.

== Performance history ==
Shortlist of notable performances of Tchaikovsky's second symphony during and shortly after his life.

- Moscow, Russian Empire: 7 February 1873, conducted by Nikolai Rubinstein
- Moscow, Russian Empire: 8 April 1873, conducted by Rubinstein (including with late changes by Tchaikovsky)
- Saint Petersburg, Russian Empire: 7 March 1874, conducted by Eduard Nápravník
- Pavlovsk, Russian Empire: 28 July 1874, conducted by Venyamin Bilz
- Hanover, German Empire: 20 March 1877, conducted by Franz Fischer (Andante and Finale movements only)
- Saint Petersburg, Russian Empire: 12 February 1881, conducted by Nápravník (1880 version)
- Moscow, Russian Empire: 3 December 1881, conducted by Karl Zike (1880 version)
- New York, United States: 7 December 1883, conducted by Leopold Damrosch at Steinway Hall
- Kiev, Russian Empire: 28 December 1885, conducted by Josef Přibík
- Kharkov, Russian Empire; 26 March 1893, conducted by Tchaikovsky himself
- Moscow, Russian Empire: 18 January 1896, conducted by Sergei Taneyev
- Bournemouth, Great Britain: 2 October 1899, conducted by Daniel Eyers Godfrey at Bournemouth Winter Gardens
- London, Great Britain: 3 September 1902, conducted by Henry Wood at Queen's Hall

== Notable recordings ==
- Leonard Bernstein conducting the New York Philharmonic
- Carlo Maria Giulini conducting the Philharmonia Orchestra
- Andrew Litton conducting the Bournemouth Symphony Orchestra
- Claudio Abbado conducting the Chicago Symphony Orchestra
- Sir Neville Marriner conducting the Academy of St Martin in the Fields
- Riccardo Muti conducting the Philharmonia Orchestra
- Eugene Ormandy conducting the Philadelphia Orchestra
- Geoffrey Simon conducting the London Symphony Orchestra in the original 1872 version
- Yuri Temirkanov conducting the Royal Philharmonic Orchestra
- Vasily Petrenko conducting the Royal Liverpool Philharmonic Orchestra
- Lorin Maazel conducting the Pittsburgh Symphony Orchestra
- Kirill Karabits conducting the Bournemouth Symphony Orchestra
- Neeme Järvi conducting the Gothenburg Symphony Orchestra
- Mstislav Rostropovich conducting the London Philharmonic Orchestra
- Igor Markevitch conducting the London Symphony Orchestra

== Bibliography ==
- Brown, David, Tchaikovsky: The Early Years, 1840–1874 (New York, W. W. Norton & Company, Inc., 1978).
- Brown, David, Tchaikovsky: The Final Years, 1885–1893, (New York: W. W. Norton & Company, 1991). ISBN 0-393-03099-7.
- Brown, David, Tchaikovsky: The Man and His Music (New York: Pegasus Books, 2007).
- Holden, Anthony, Tchaikovsky: A Biography (New York: Random House, 1995).
- Keller, Hans, ed. Simpson, Robert, The Symphony, Volume One (Harmondsworth, 1966).
- Poznansky, Alexander, Tchaikovsky: The Quest for the Inner Man (New York, Schirmer Books, 1991).
- Warrack, John, Tchaikovsky (New York: Charles Scribner's Sons, 1973)
- Warrack, John, Tchaikovsky Symphonies and Concertos (Seattle: University of Washington Press, 1971, 1969) .
- Zhitomirsky, Daniel, ed. Shostakovich, Dmitri, Russian Symphony: Thoughts About Tchaikovsky (New York: Philosophical Library, 1947).
