= Chiki (TV series) =

- Genre: Comedy drama
- Created by: Eduard Oganesyan
- Written by: Eduard Oganesyan
- Directed by: Eduard Oganesyan
- Starring: Irina Gorbacheva; Irina Nosova; Varvara Shmykova; Alena Mikhailova; Anton Lapenko
- Opening theme: "Chiki" by Ivan Dorn
- Country of origin: Russia
- Original language: Russian
- No. of seasons: 1
- No. of episodes: 8

Production
- Executive producer: Margarita Popova
- Producers: Ruben Dishdishyan; Denis Gorshkov; Yuliya Ivanova; Vyacheslav Murugov; Maksim Rybakov; Fyodor Bondarchuk; Mikhail Vrubel; Alexander Andryushchenko
- Cinematography: Yuri Nikogosov; Mikhail Dementyev
- Running time: 47 minutes
- Production companies: NMG Studio; Mars Media

Original release
- Network: more.tv STS
- Release: June 4 – July 16, 2020

Chiki (Russian: Чи́ки) is a Russian comedy-drama television series produced by NMG Studio and Mars Media. The series was one of the original projects of the more originals lineup.

The first two episodes premiered on 4 June 2020 on the streaming service more.tv. New episodes were released weekly on Thursdays. The final episode was released on 16 July 2020.

== Plot ==
Svetа, Lyuda, and Marina are sex workers operating along a highway in a small southern Russian town. Their friend Zhanna returns from Moscow and proposes that they start their own business and begin a new life.

They face opposition from their former pimp, businessman Valera, and his nephew Danila, a criminal and Cossack.

A parallel storyline follows Roma, Zhanna’s son. Roma’s father, Kostya, attempts to rebuild a relationship with his son, but Zhanna refuses any contact with him.

After losing their money to scammers, the women initially fail to start their business, and Zhanna finds herself in serious trouble. Ultimately, however, thanks to Zhanna’s determination, her friends leave their former lives behind, find love, and rebuild relationships with their families.

== Cast ==
=== Main ===
- Irina Gorbacheva as Zhanna
- Irina Nosova as Sveta
- Varvara Shmykova as Lyuda
- Alyona Mikhaylova as Marina

=== Supporting ===
- Mikhail Troynik as Father Sergiy
- Daniil Kuznets as Roma
- Vitali Kishchenko as Valera
- Viktoriya Tolstoganova as Marina’s mother
- Steven Ochsner as Kostya
- Anton Lapenko as Yura, a police officer
- Sergey Gilyov as Danila
- Ivan Fominov as Anton
- Nikolai Denisov as Sveta’s father
- Anatoly Mateshov as Lyuda’s father
- Sergey Barinov as Marina’s grandfather
- Tatyana Shkrabak as Marina’s grandmother
- Marina Ivanova as Lyuda’s stepmother

== Episodes ==
| Season | Episodes | Original release |
|---|---|---|
| 1 | 8 | 4 June – 16 July 2020 |

== Production ==
Filming of the pilot episode took place in August 2018.

Principal photography occurred from July to October 2019 in Kabardino-Balkaria.

On 4 September 2019, the film crew was fired upon by an intoxicated local resident using a Saiga rifle in the town of Prokhladny. No one was injured, and the suspect was detained by police.

== Music ==
One of the soundtracks was composed by Ivan Dorn. His song "Chiki" was released on 4 June 2020 by the Masterskaya label and made available on Apple Music.

== Reception ==
The series recorded the most successful launch in the history of the more.tv streaming service. Within three weeks, the first four episodes accumulated 3.5 million views.

== Awards ==
- 2021 — National Web Industry Award: Online Event of the Year; Best Internet Series
- 2021 — Association of Film and Television Producers Awards: Best TV Series; Best Director; Best Original Music; Best Cinematography; Best Casting
