= Petrópolis (film) =

Russian drama film 2022

- Directed by: Valery Fokin
- Written by: Kirill Fokin
- Based on: Fire by Kirill Fokin
- Produced by: Renat Davletyarov; Grigory Podzemelnyy; Artyom Vitkin; Svetlana Izvekova; Yuliya Titov
- Starring: Anton Shagin; Yuliya Snigir; Vladimir Koshevoy; Odin Biron; Junsuke Kinoshita
- Cinematography: Ilya Ovsenev
- Edited by: Olga Grinshpun
- Production companies: Interfest; Revolution Film; Ministry of Culture
- Distributed by: The White Nights
- Release date: October 27, 2022 (Russia)
- Running time: 118 minutes
- Country: Russia
- Language: Russian
- Box office: ₽2 million

Petrópolis (Russian: Петрополис) is a 2022 Russian science-fiction thriller drama film directed by Valery Fokin, with a script of the tape is based on the story Fire, authored by the director's son Kirill Fokin. The film stars Anton Shagin and Yuliya Snigir, and they will be accompanied by Vladimir Koshevoy, Odin Biron, and Junsuke Kinoshita.

Petrópolis is scheduled was theatrically released on October 27, 2022, by The White Nights film distribution company.

== Plot ==
The film tells about a young man who went to study in the United States, where he met a girl whom he married. He is successful in his studies and happy in his personal life, and suddenly, having defended his dissertation, he receives an invitation to a closed international organization to investigate a hypothetical scenario there: what will be the reaction of people if they find out that aliens really exist and have been in contact with us for a long time?

== Cast ==
- Anton Shagin as Vladimir Ognev
- Yuliya Snigir as Anna
- Vladimir Koshevoy as Mann
- Odin Biron as Philip Graham
- Junsuke Kinoshita as Osiri
- Daniel Barnes as Colleague
- Richard Lee Wilson as President of the United States
- Marco Dinelli as President of France
- Igor Kim as a special agent
- Elizaveta Martinez Kardenaz as Natalia Bard
- Jonathan Solvay as Alec Jones
- Olivier Siou as Anibal Silva
- Sebastian Sisak as Leo Franchetti

== Production ==
The film was directed by a well-known Russian theater director Valery Fokin, after almost a twenty-year break, returned to the cinema to shoot Petrópolis based on the novel Fire by his son Kirill Fokin, published in 2016 by the Veche publishing house and adapted for the stage of the Alexandrinsky Theatre in 2016. Later, based on the story, a play called Today. 2016 - ....

The film was produced by Revolution Film and Interfest with the support of the Ministry of Culture of the Russian Federation.

=== Filming ===
Principal photography process began in August 2020 in Saint Petersburg and the region of Leningrad Oblast. The main part of the filming took place in Moscow in August and September 2020 this year in the pavilion of the indoor karting center with an area of 6800 sq. m. on the territory of the Moscow Pipe Plant "FILIT", where the largest scenery in Russian cinema at the moment was built. The locations of St. Petersburg, Miami and Tokyo are united in a single scenery.

For filming in Moscow, a large-scale set was built on the territory of the former pipe plant - about 20 locations, which fit three countries: Russia, America, Japan. Here, not only the interiors of houses and offices, but also streets, boulevards, pavements, cafes and Restaurants and even a villa on the beach in Miami. This house is from the memories of Ognev, where he once lived with his wife and was happy. And since this is the space of Vladimir’s memories, part of the scenery is realistic, and part is painted on the wall. Director Valery Fokin came up with such a combination of cinema and theater together with the famous artist Aleksey Tregubov.

== Release ==
Petrópolis was presented at the 2019 Cannes Film Festival on the Producers Network program of the Marche du Film film market.

It is scheduled to be theatrically released in the Russian Federation on October 27, 2022, by The White Nights film distribution company.
