= The Three (film) =

- Directed by: Anna Melikian
- Written by: Mikhail Idov
- Produced by: Natella Krapivina
- Starring: Konstantin Khabensky; Viktoriya Isakova; Yulia Peresild; Sergey Nabiyev; Varvara Shmykova; Valentin Vall
- Cinematography: Nikolai Zheludovich
- Music by: Konstantin Poznekov
- Production company: Metrafilms
- Release date: December 3, 2020
- Country: Russia
- Language: Russian

The Three (Russian: Трое) is a 2020 Russian drama film directed by Anna Melikian. It premiered at the Patriki Film Festival and was theatrically released in Russia on December 3, 2020.

The film is about a married TV show host who receives an award and meets a new love, causing him to suffer and doom those he loves to suffering.

== Plot ==
The film centers on Muscovites Sasha and Zlata, a seemingly ideal couple who have been together for a decade. Both have successful careers: Sasha (played by Konstantin Khabensky) hosts a popular evening TV show, and Zlata (Viktoriya Isakova) is a well-regarded psychologist who conducts motivational workshops. However, their outwardly perfect life is a facade. Sasha is burnt out and feels stifled in his controlled relationship with Zlata, who is troubled by their childless marriage. When Sasha, receives yet another award in St. Petersburg, he impulsively attempts suicide by drowning in the Neva river. A passerby, a free-spirited local named Veronika (Yuliya Peresild), rescues him and takes him home, igniting a spark between them. Though Sasha doesn’t act on his attraction, he returns to Moscow preoccupied with Veronika, complicating his life with Zlata, who suspects something is amiss.

As Sasha’s thoughts drift constantly to Veronika, Zlata grows increasingly uneasy, eventually discovering Veronika’s contact on his phone. Confronted with her husband’s emotional betrayal, she decides to leave, but not before meeting Veronika in person. Finding nothing exceptional about her rival, Zlata ultimately buys Veronika a new apartment to end any connection between her and Sasha. Disappointed by Sasha's indecision, Veronika eventually chooses to leave him as well, realizing he cannot commit. In the film’s open-ended conclusion, Sasha is seen near water, contemplating his next move, hinting at a possible new beginning but leaving his choice unresolved.

== Cast ==
- Konstantin Khabensky as Alexandr
- Viktoriya Isakova as Zlata
- Yulia Peresild as Veronika
- Sergey Nabiyev
- Varvara Shmykova
- Valentin Vall
