= Varvara Shmykova =

Russian actress (born 1992)

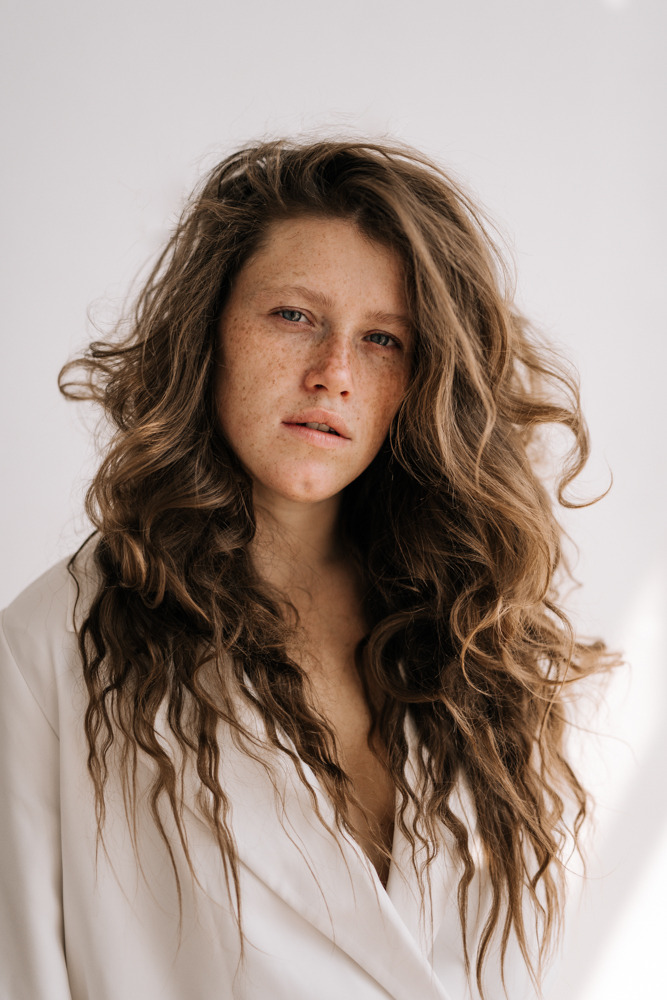
- Born: Varvara Romanovna Shmykova; February 24, 1992 (age 34); Moscow, Russia
- Citizenship: Russian
- Education: Moscow Art Theatre School
- Occupation: Actress
- Years active: 2010–present

Varvara Romanovna Shmykova (born 24 February 1992) is a Russian stage and film actress.

== Biography ==
Varvara Shmykova was born on 24 February 1992 in Moscow, Russia, into a large family with three brothers and two sisters. During her childhood, she practiced hand-to-hand combat and arm wrestling, and also played football as a midfielder for the Northern Tushino district team.

From 2004 to 2010, she performed at the Children's Musical Theater of the Young Actor, appearing in productions such as Oliver Twist, Tom Sawyer, Moscow Story, and Dream of Rain.

Between 2010 and 2011, she studied at the Russian Institute of Theatre Arts on the variety arts faculty under Valery Garkalin and Mikhail Borisov, but left voluntarily.

She later enrolled at the Moscow Art Theatre School after several attempts, studying under Viktor Ryzhakov. Her graduating class later formed the independent troupe Iyulansambl ("July Ensemble"), where she became one of the leading actresses.

Shmykova worked in theatre productions at the Meyerhold Center, Praktika Theatre, and other Moscow venues.

She made her screen debut in the detective television series Delo Krapivinykh in 2010. She later appeared in films such as Cinema About Alekseyev and Andrey Zvyagintsev's Loveless.

In 2020, Shmykova gained wide recognition for one of the leading roles in the television series Chiki, directed by Eduard Oganesyan.

In 2026, the film Minotaur by Andrey Zvyagintsev starring Shmykova, won the Grand Prix at the 79th Cannes Film Festival.

She has also worked in dubbing, providing Russian voice acting for productions including Tinker Bell, Hannah Montana, and High School Musical.

== Personal life ==
Until 2021, Shmykova was married to cinematographer Yevgeny Kozlov, whom she met in 2011. Their son, Korney, was born in Los Angeles in 2017 and holds dual citizenship.

In March 2022, she married DJ Daniil Radlov. On 11 June 2023, the couple had a son named Luka in Argentina.

== Public activity ==
Shmykova has participated in social and charitable projects supporting nonprofit organizations.

In 2021, she publicly supported Russian opposition politician Alexei Navalny and protests against political repression.

In 2022, she publicly opposed the Russian invasion of Ukraine and subsequently moved abroad.

== Filmography ==
Year	Title	Notes
2010	Delo Krapivinykh	Television series
2011	Raskol	
2011	Golubka	
2014	The Film About Alekseyev	
2017	Loveless	Role of Lena
2020	Chiki	Television series
2020	Varya	Short film
2020	The Three	
2021	Petrov's Flu	
2021	Tchaikovsky's Wife	
2023	Peace! Love! Chewing Gum!	Season 3
2023	Mikulai	
2024	Others	Television series
2026	Minotaur	

== Awards and recognition ==
- Included in the Russian edition of the Forbes 30 Under 30 list in the arts category.
- Received a special diploma at the 2020 Kinotavr Film Festival for the short film Varya.
