= Nikolay Kashkin =

Russian music critic (1839–1920)

Nikolai Kashkin
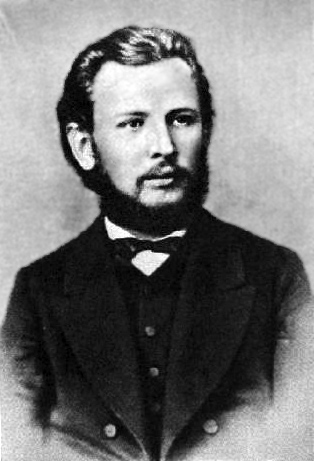
- Born: 27 November 1839
- Died: 15 March 1920 (aged 80)
- Occupations: Music critic; professor

Nikolay Dmitriyevich Kashkin (Russian: Николай Дмитриевич Кашкин; 27 November [O.S. 15 November] 1839 – 15 March 1920) was a Russian music critic as well as a professor of piano and music theory at the Moscow Conservatory for 33 years (1866–1896, 1905–1908).

== Life ==
The son of a Voronezh bookseller, Kashkin was a self-taught musician who had started giving piano lessons by the time he was 13 years old. In 1860, he travelled to Moscow for further study in piano with Alexandre Dubuque. There he met Herman Laroche, Nikolai Rubinstein and Pyotr Ilyich Tchaikovsky.

He contributed music criticism primarily to the Russian Register and the Moscow Register, sometimes under the pseudonym "Nikolai Dmitriev."

As a critic, Kashkin would do valuable service in the promotion of Tchaikovsky's music. Beginning with Tchaikovsky's unfinished opera The Voyevoda which was half-destroyed by the composer and attemptively reconstructed starting in the 1930s, Kashkin was a strong advocate for Tchaikovsky's work. He was an early support of Tchaikovsky's penultimate opera, The Queen of Spades, arguing it would become a leading name in Russian operatic repertoire.

It was he who provided the epithet "Little Russian" for Tchaikovsky's Symphony No. 2. Tchaikovsky dedicated the song "Not a Word, O My Friend", Op. 6, No. 2 (1869) to him. Kashkin was also a support of the "National School" of Russian music developed by the group known as The Five.

Kashkin published his recollections of Pyotr Tchaikovsky three years after the composer's death in 1893.

== Works ==
=== Essays ===
- 1897: "Essay on the history of Russian music"
- 1897: "Opera stage of the Moscow Imperial Theater"

=== Monograph ===
- 1896: "Memoirs" of Tchaikovsky

== Sources ==
- "Кашкин, Николай Дмитриевич" . Brockhaus and Efron Encyclopedic Dictionary (in Russian). 1906.
