= Perm State Institute of Culture =

Educational institution in Perm, Russia

Perm State Institute of Culture (PSIC)
- Пермский государственный институт культуры (ПГИК)
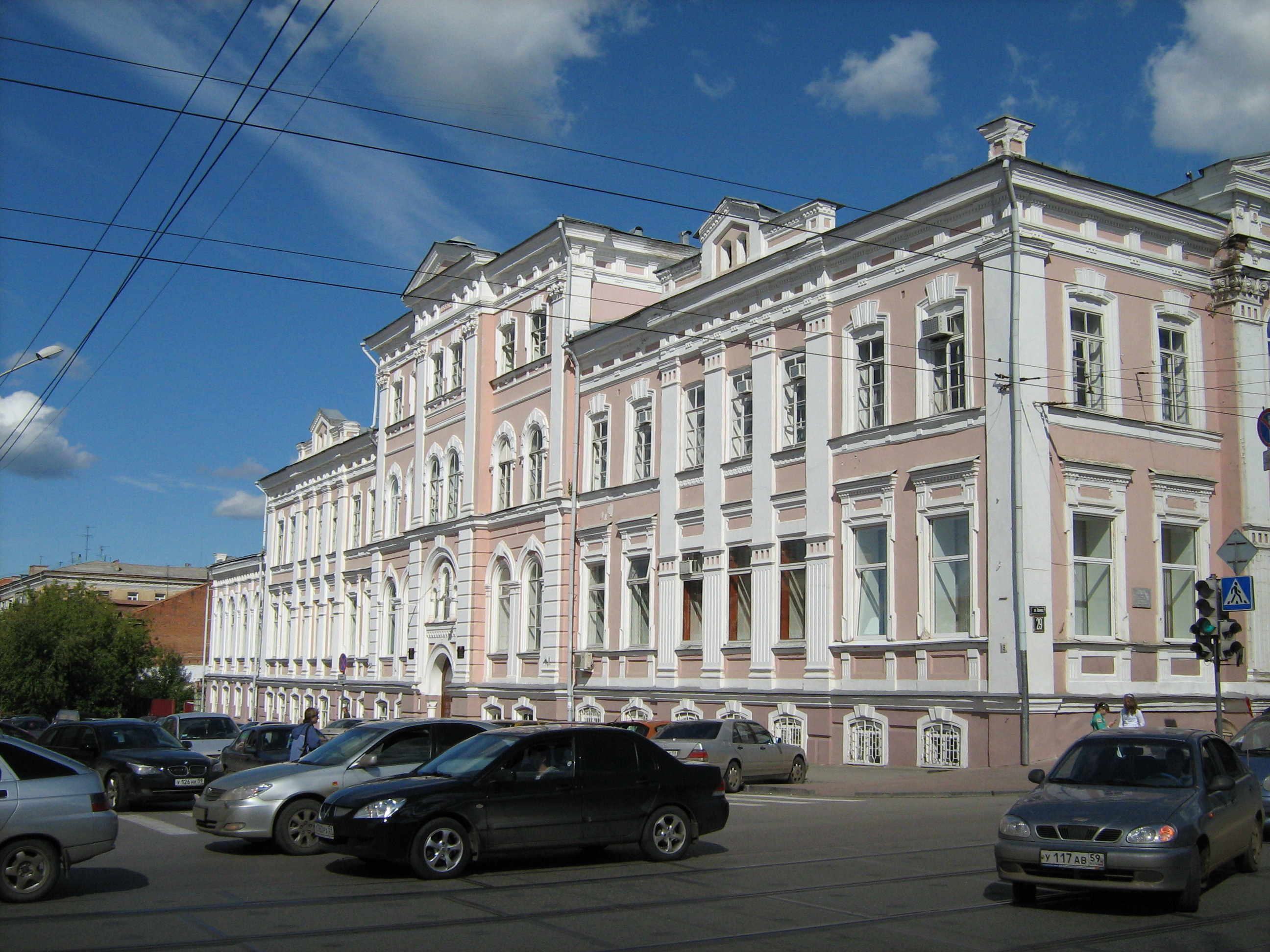
- Former names: Perm Institute of Culture; Perm State Institute of Art and Culture; Perm State Academy of Arts and Culture
- Type: public
- Established: 1975
- Rector: Lyudmila Ivanovna Drobysheva-Razumovskaya
- Students: 1795
- Location: 18 Gazety Zvezda street, Perm, Russia; 58°00′47″N 56°14′36″E
- Campus: Urban
- Website: www.psiac.ru

Perm State Institute of Culture (PSIC; Russian: Пермский государственный институт культуры; ПГИК, Permskiy gosudarstvennyy institut kul'tury; PGIK) is a state institution of higher education in Volga Federal District of Russia located in the city of Perm, the administrative centre of Perm Krai. This is the only musical institution of higher education in the region.

== History ==
On 26 March 1975, the Perm Institute of Culture (PIC) was formed, which trained librarian and club workers for the Kirov and Perm Oblasts, as well as the Udmurt ASSR and Komi ASSR. From the moment of its foundation, the institute had the only musical specialty – folk instruments. A few years later, the institute added training for pianists and other musical specialties.

In 1991, the PIC was renamed into the Perm State Institute of Art and Culture (PSIAC).

In 2013, the experimental faculty “Conservatory” was created at PSIAC, which teaches in all musical specialties. In the same year, PSIAC was renamed into the Perm State Academy of Arts and Culture.

In 2015, it was renamed into the Perm State Institute of Culture (PSIC).

For the period from 1975 to 2020, the PSIC produced 14.5 thousand specialists.

== Structure ==
The institute has 5 faculties (Faculty of Cultural Studies and Socio-Cultural Technologies; Faculty of Documentary and Information Communications; Faculty of Arts; Faculty of Arts and Education; Faculty of Additional and Innovative Education) and 15 departments (chairs).
