= Antonina Miliukova =

Wife of Pyotr Ilyich Tchaikovsky (1848–1917)

- Антонина Милюкова
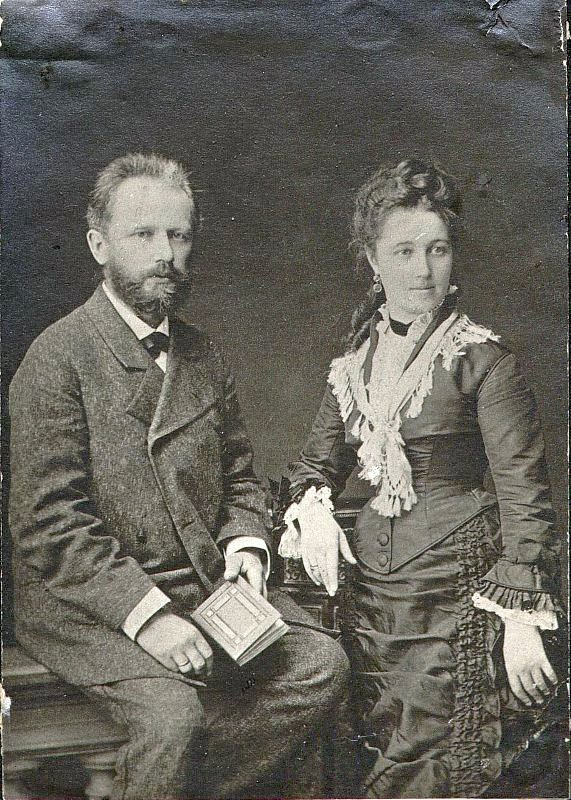
- Antonina Miliukova with Pyotr Ilyich Tchaikovsky during their honeymoon in 1877
- Born: 8 April 1848
- Died: 16 February 1917 (aged 68)
- Other name: Antonina Tchaikovskaya
- Spouse: Pyotr Ilyich Tchaikovsky (m. 1877)

Antonina Ivanovna Miliukova (Russian: Антонина Ивановна Милюкова; 16 August [O.S. 4 August] 1848 – 1 March [O.S. 16 February] 1917) was the wife of Russian composer Pyotr Ilyich Tchaikovsky from 1877 until his death in 1893. After marriage she was known as Antonina Tchaikovskaya.

== Early years ==
Little is known of Antonina before she met Tchaikovsky. Her family resided in the Moscow area. They belonged to the local gentry but lived in poverty. The family was also a highly fractious one. Tchaikovsky tells us as much in a letter he wrote his sister Alexandra Davydova during his honeymoon:

After three days with them in the country, I begin to see that everything I can't stand in my wife derives from her belonging to a completely weird family, where the mother was always arguing with the father—and now, after his death, does not hesitate to malign his memory in every way possible. It's a family in which the mother hates (!!!) some of her own children, in which the sisters are constantly squabbling, in which the only son has completely fallen out with his mother and all his sisters, etc., etc.

Antonina first met Tchaikovsky in 1865 at the Moscow home of a common friend, Anastasia Khvostova, a well-known singer. His close friend Alexei Apukhtin was staying with her, and Anastasia's brother Nikolai had been a classmate of Tchaikovsky's brother Modest at the School of Jurisprudence. Antonina was 16 at the time; Tchaikovsky was 25. Although he did not recall this meeting, she immediately became infatuated with him.

She reportedly gave up work as a professional seamstress to study music at the Moscow Music Conservatory. Tchaikovsky was one of her professors. Eventually she had to abandon her studies at that institution, probably as a result of financial troubles. She wrote to Tchaikovsky on at least two occasions in 1877, two years after she had left school. At that time she was 28, far past the age at which women of that time generally married.

== Marriage to Tchaikovsky ==
By June 1877, Tchaikovsky proposed marriage, in order (according to one theory) to please his family and put to rest any social rumors regarding his sexual orientation. He described Miliukova as "a woman with whom I am not the least in love."

They were married at the Church of Saint George in Moscow on 18 July 1877 (6 July, old style) and held their wedding dinner at the Hermitage Restaurant.

=== Separation ===
The marriage was disastrous for Tchaikovsky. A permanent separation followed after only six weeks, for which his brother Modest blamed Antonina's character. In his biography of Tchaikovsky, Modest describes her as a "crazed half-wit." According to biographer Anthony Holden, "In truth, Antonina was as much the right woman for Tchaikovsky as any other. It was marriage which was the wrong institution."

For Antonina the marriage was a period of great happiness. She wrote, "I would look at him surreptitiously, so he didn't notice, and admire him enormously, especially during morning tea. So handsome, with kindly eyes which melted my heart, he breathed such freshness into my life! I would just sit there looking at him, and think 'Thank God he belongs to me and no-one else! Now he is my husband, no one can take him away from me ...'"

Antonina reacted negatively to her separation from Tchaikovsky, which his brother Anatoly confirmed to her would be permanent. Nikolai Rubinstein, an acquaintance of Antonina, accompanied Anatoly to discuss the situation. At Tchaikovsky's apartment, Antonina invited both men in for tea. Rubinstein explained her husband's condition, and the report from a psychologist who had examined him. He did so with a bluntness and "cruel precision of expression," Anatoly later recalled to Nikolay Kashkin, that "made me go hot and cold." Antonina responded that she would agree to whatever her "darling Peti" wanted. She then began pouring tea. This reaction surprised both men.

Rubinstein left soon after:

"Anatonina Ivanovna saw Rubinstein to the door, and returned with a broad smile on her face, saying, 'Well, who'd have thought I would entertain the famous Rubinstein to tea at my home today!'"

She told Anatoly about a number of her prior romantic relationships. After that she asked what Anatoly would like for dinner. Anatoly followed Rubinstein out the door as soon as he could. He headed back to St. Petersburg and made arrangements to take his brother on a prolonged tour of Western Europe.

Kashkin, in his retelling of the incident, characterized Antonina's behavior as indicative of mental imbalance. Modest treated it similarly in his biography.

Antonina believed she was the victim of a family conspiracy to end the marriage. She wrote, "We were separated by constant whispering to Pyotr Ilyich that family life would kill his talent. At first, he paid no attention to this talk, but then he began somewhat to listen to it more and more attentively.... To lose his talent was for him the most dreadful thing of all. He began to believe their slanders and became dull and gloomy."

She also believed that Tchaikovsky's collapse, which immediately preceded their separation, was caused by stress from his obligations to her and his music. She accompanied him to the railway station on the last day of their union.

"One day, he told me he needed to go away on business for three days. I accompanied him to the mail train; his eyes were wandering, he was nervous, but I was so far in my thoughts from any trouble already hanging over my head. Before the first bell he had a spasm in his throat and went alone with jerky irregular steps to the station to drink some water. Then we entered the car, he looked at me plaintively, without lowering his eyes […] He never came back to me."

== Divorce attempts ==
On 5 October 1877, Tchaikovsky wired his brother Anatoly, telling him to wire a summons to St. Petersburg in conductor Eduard Nápravník's name. Anatoly settled his brother in St. Petersburg. He then traveled to Moscow, accompanied by Nikolai Rubinstein, to ask Antonina to consent to a divorce. Although she did not consent, Tchaikovsky and Antonina never lived together again. After finding Tchaikovsky verging on a nervous breakdown, Anatoly summoned a mental specialist. The specialist told Tchaikovsky not to cohabit or see his wife again.

Due to laws regarding divorce in Imperial Russia, the two remained legally married until Tchaikovsky's death. This did not prevent his further attempts at divorce in 1878 and 1879. The only legal ground for divorce was adultery, which Antonina refused to admit. A 10,000 ruble incentive from von Meck to accept the divorce was also rejected. This sum would have been payable through his publisher, P. Jurgenson, once a divorce had been finalized.

Antonina may have helped fuel Tchaikovsky's fear of public exposure by her unpredictable behavior. During her stay at Kamenka immediately following their separation, she wrote him letters that unsettled him. In July 1880, she accused him of spreading rumors about her in Moscow. She responded, "Why didn't you start with yourself, telling […] about your own terrible vice?"

In March 1881, Antonina gave birth to a child out of wedlock. Although Tchaikovsky now had legal grounds for divorce, he did not act. He might have thought that legal action would drag up matters he hoped were forgotten or at least buried. He continued to send her a regular allowance, which may have helped buy her silence. Divorce would have meant Tchaikovsky's freedom from any further financial responsibility for her. Eventually, she had three children. She surrendered each of them to foundling hospitals.

== Tchaikovsky's views on his wife ==
Tchaikovsky himself insisted to his patroness, Nadezhda von Meck, "My wife, whatever she may be, is not to be blamed for my having driven the situation to the point where marriage became necessary. The blame for everything lies on my lack of character, my weakness, impracticality, childishness!" He considered his falling in with her, at a time when he had decided to be married simply for the sake of being married, as something to simply attribute to Fate. Nevertheless, he personally showed nothing but disregard for her after their separation, often referring to her as "the reptile". For the rest of his life, any news concerning her drove him to hysterics. A single letter from her could upset him for several days.

He continued to disparage her to von Meck.

"You will ask, of course: but how did we spend the time when she and I were alone together? She is very talkative, but all her talk comes down to the following two subjects. Hourly she would repeat to me innumerable stories about innumerable who had felt tender feelings toward her. For the most part, these were generals, nephews of prominent bankers, well-known artists, even members of the imperial family."

"Next," he continued to von Meck,

"she would no less frequently, and with a sort of inexplicable passion, describe to me the vices, the cruel and base actions and detestable behavior of all her relatives, with every of whom, it turned out, she is in enmity. Her mother would especially catch her in this.... The third topic of her tireless chatter was her stories of life at boarding school. There was no end to them."

He also added, "Desiring to know what maternal instincts she had, I asked her once whether she liked children. I received in reply: 'Yes, when they are clever.'"

Things changed when Tchaikovsky returned to Moscow from Kamenka. Antonina demanded that he fulfill his marital duties in the bedroom. Tchaikovsky considered this change an act of betrayal. It sent him into despair and severely wounded his pride.

== Later years ==
In later years, the couple met briefly a couple of times, much to Tchaikovsky's displeasure. Though Antonina outlived Tchaikovsky by 24 years, she was committed for the last 20 of them to an insane asylum. She died on 1 March 1917 in Moscow at age 68.

== Her memoirs ==
After his death she wrote or dictated her reminiscences about their marriage. While they were printed in 1894 and reprinted in 1913, they were never widely known. According to Tchaikovsky scholar Alexander Poznansky, she comes across in them as naive, superficial and not very intelligent. He also said that her memoirs revealed a woman devoted to the memory of her husband, an appreciation of his greatness, and the vague feeling of an enormous misunderstanding having taken place between them. Poznansky added that "nothing in the reminiscences gives any grounds for suspecting them for being a forgery. On the contrary, the genuineness of the intonation, the idiosyncratic style, and the wealth of detail all attest its authenticity."

== Antonina Miliukova in media ==
=== Film ===
- The Music Lovers (1970, UK)
  Glenda Jackson portrays Antonina.
- Tchaikovsky's Wife (2022, Russia)
  Alyona Mikhaylova portrays Antonina.

=== Television ===
- BBC Tchaikovsky Experience (2007, UK)
  Alice Glover portrays Antonina.
