= Sofie Parelius =

Norwegian actress

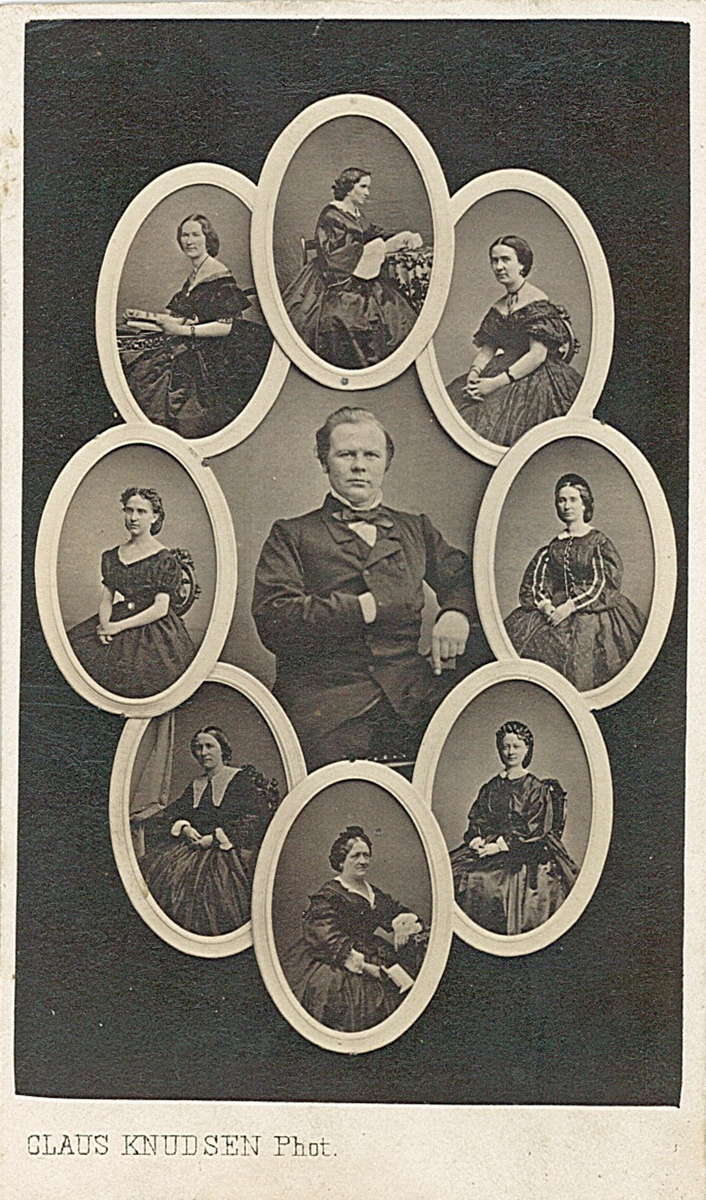
The actor Johannes Brun of Det norske Theater in Bergen and of the Christiania Theater in a montage from circa 1865 made by photographer Claus Peter Knudsen, surrounded by actresses. Clockwise from top: His wife Louise Brun, Lucie Wolf, Clara Ursin, Elisa Bidenkap, Signe Giebelhausen, Sofie Parelius, Amalie Døvle and Laura Gundersen.

Sofie Marie Parelius (18 September 1823 – 18 September 1902) was a Norwegian stage actress. She was known for her ability in comedy and viewed as one of the best Norwegian actors of her time in the classic works of Ludvig Holberg. She belonged to the elite of the actors at the Christiania Theatre in the second half of the 19th century, when Norwegian actors successively replaced the Danish on Norway's national stage.

== Biography ==
Sofie Parelius was born in Bergen, Norway. She was the daughter of Henrich Kjønning Parelius and Sofie Dahm.

She debuted in 1852 at the Christiania Norwegian Theatre in Oslo. She was at Det norske Theater in Bergen in 1857-1860. She was active at the Christiania Theatre in 1860-1899, and at the Christiania Folke theater under the management of Bjørnstjerne Bjørnson from 1870 to 1872.

Parelius appeared in the play Peer Gynt by Henrik Ibsen at the premiere performance at Christiania Theater on 24 February 1876.

== Other sources ==
- Blanc, Tharald Høyerup: Christiania theaters historie 1827-1877, J.W. Cappelen Christiania
