= Signe Giebelhausen =

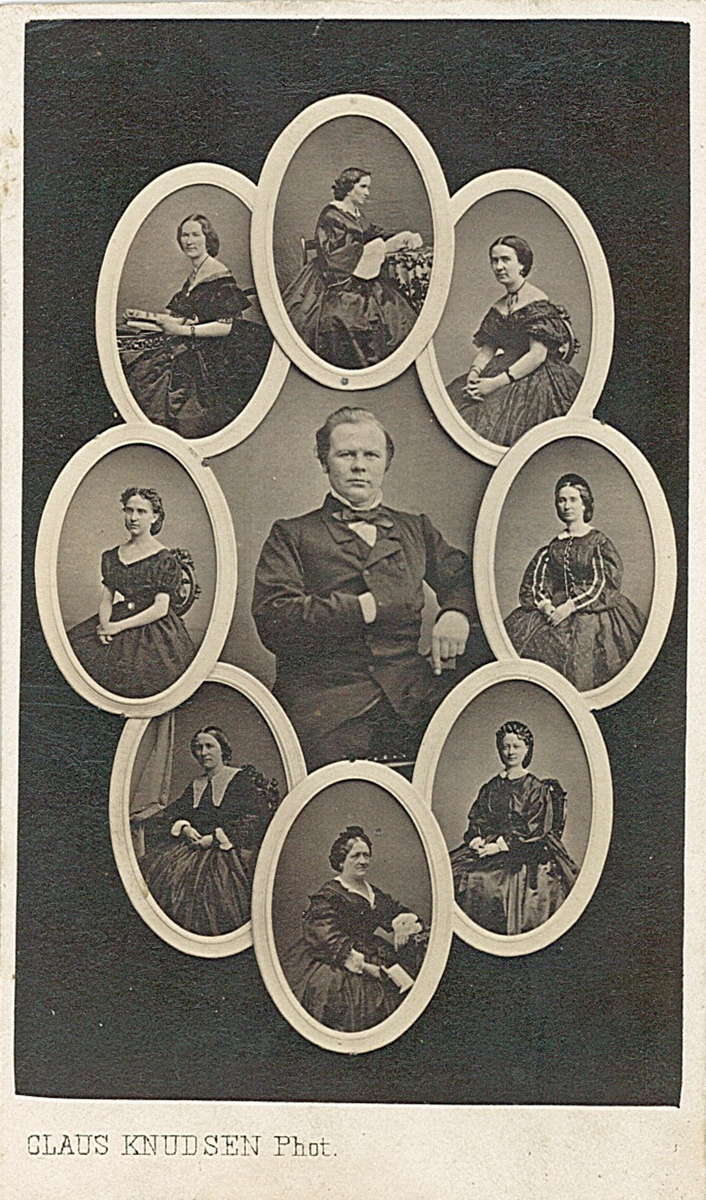
The actor Johannes Brun of Det norske Theater in Bergen and of the Christiania Theater in a montage from circa 1865 made by photographer Claus Peter Knudsen, surrounded by actresses. From top following the sun: His wife Louise Brun, Lucie Wolf, Clara Ursin, Elisa Bidenkap, Signe Giebelhausen, Sofie Parelius, Amalie Døvle and Laura Gundersen.

Signe Giebelhausen (17 November 1811 - 10 April 1879) was a Danish-born, Norwegian stage actress. She was active at the Christiania Offentlige Theater and the Christiania Theatre in Oslo in 1833-73. She was married to the actor Christian Giebelhausen.

She was the biological daughter of Georg Flemming Krog and Kari Regine Löhmoe. The mother was later married to actor Jacob Alexander Winsløw (son of actors Carl Winsløw and Sophie Winsløw) by whom she was adopted. Prior to her marriage, she was known as Signe Winsløw. She was married to Danish actor abd tgeatre director Christian Christopher Giebelhausen (1807-1885) with whom she moved to Norway.

Alongside Christian Jörgenseen, Peter Nielsen, Augusta Schrumpf and Emilie da Fonseca, she belonged to the acting elite in Norway in the first half of the 19th century, when the Christiania Theatre was the only standing stage in Norway, and dominated by actors of Danish origin. She is most known for her successful roles as elder aristocratic ladies in burgher comedies.
