= The Feast at Solhaug =

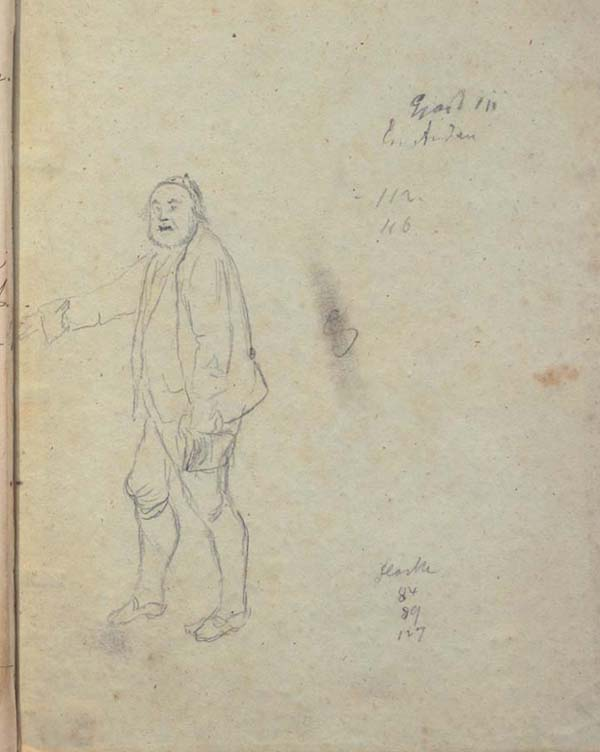
Sketch from inside the rear cover of the prompter's script from 1855, which probably shows the householder Bengt Gauteson drawn by the playwright himself, Henrik Ibsen.

The Feast at Solhaug (or in the original Norwegian Gildet paa Solhoug) is the first publicly successful drama by Henrik Ibsen. It was written in 1855 and had its premier at Det norske Theater in Bergen on 2 January 1856. Part of the strength and charm of this play as well as Ibsen's other early poetic works results from the style of the poetic form and the inherent melody of the old ballads for those who speak Scandinavian languages.

== Plot ==
The play opens on the day of the feast celebrating the third wedding anniversary of the marriage of Bengt Gauteson and Margit. Erik of Hogge, a friend of Knut Gesling, the King's sheriff, and Knut himself are seeking permission for Knut to marry Margit's sister Signe. Knut, a warlike man, is advised that he must demonstrate peaceful ways for a year before Margit will support the marriage. They are invited to the feast under pledge that they will be peaceful that night.

They depart to look for Margit's kinsman, Gudmund Alfson, who they know to be outlawed and suspect is nearby. Once they depart and her husband leaves, Margit speaks of her regret in marrying Bengt Gauteson, although he was a wealthy older landowner. Her woe is captured by her phrase, "I myself am the Hill-King's wife!"

Gudmund Alfson arrives. Margit, who has loved him since he departed three years earlier, treats him poorly until she realizes that, although once close to the king, he has been outlawed and is on the run. She then dreams of marrying him and obtains poison to administer to Bengt.

Meanwhile, Gudmund speaks to Signe, who has grown up since he last saw her, expressing his love. Signe remembers him well and is most willing.

Knut returns in the evening for the feast. Finding Gudmund there, although he is the sheriff, Knut does not take Gudmund to demonstrate his intent to be peaceful, but declares that this day shall end peacefully.

They speak together, expressing their intent to marry. After some discussion they both proclaim, and realize they woo the same woman. Since Signe loves Gudmund, Knut announces he is leaving peacefully, but will return in the morning to take Gudmund.

Margit prepares to poison Bengt after many of the guests depart, leaving him a poisoned drink as she goes to bed. He is advised of Knut’s return and, setting aside his drink, goes to meet Knut and his men. Gudmund and Signe enter and almost drink the poison.

As Knut returns in the morning and meets Bengt, who is set upon defending his household, Knut slays him. Bengt’s friends capture Knut and bring him before Margit.

The king’s men arrive. Gudmund is prepared to surrender, but finds that the king has recognized his error and restored all of Gudmund’s property and standing.

Margit wishes Gudmund and Signe well and goes off to St. Sunniva's cloister.

== List of main characters ==
- BENGT GAUTESON, Master of Solhoug.
- MARGIT, his wife.
- SIGNE, her sister.
- GUDMUND ALFSON, their kinsman.
- KNUT GESLING, the King's sheriff.
- ERIK OF HEGGE, his friend.

In the first staging of the play, at Det norske Theater in Bergen in 1856, the main characters were performed by Johannes Brun as Bengt Gauteson, his wife in real life Louise Brun as Margit, Fredrikke Nielsen as Signe, Jacob Prom as Gudmund Alfson, Andreas Isachsen as Knut Gesling, and Carl Hansen as Erik of Hegge. The director was the playwright himself, Henrik Ibsen.
