= Janny Grip Isachsen =

Norwegian actress

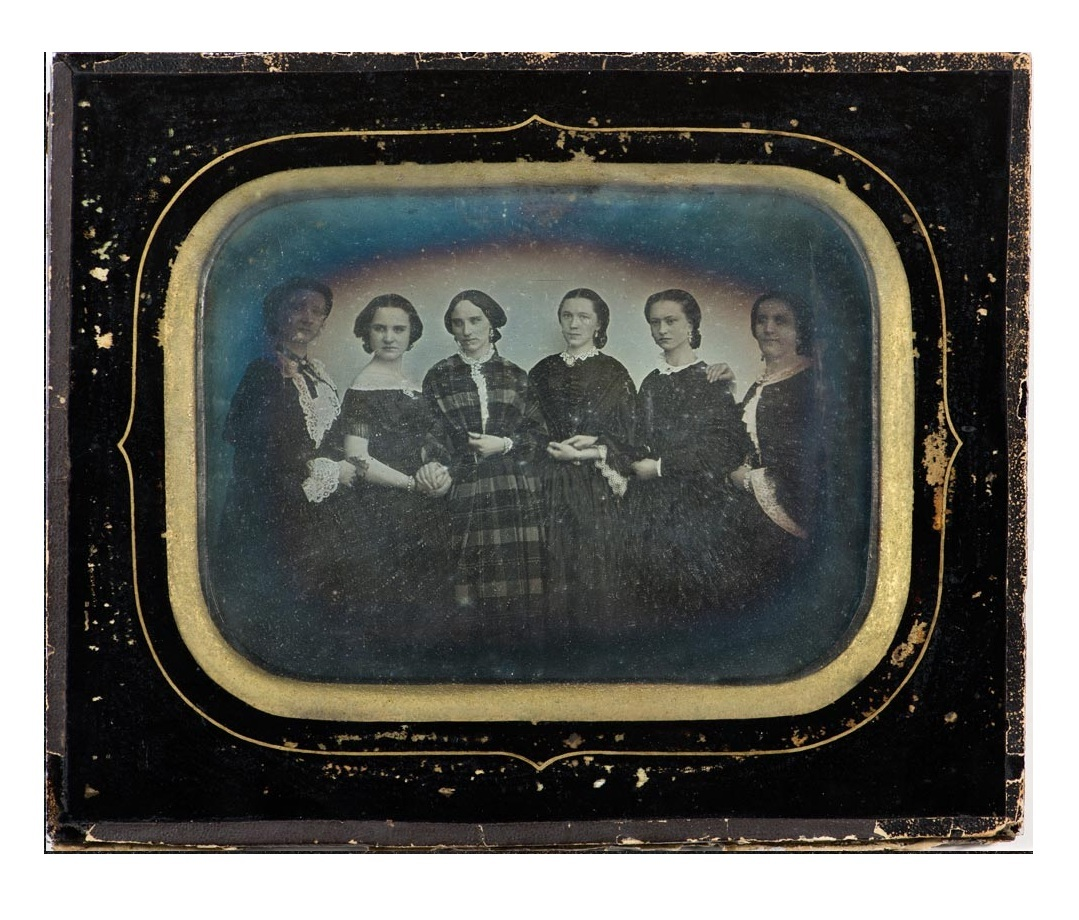
Daguerreotype of the actresses at the first Norwegian Theater, 1856. From left: Ms. Sørensen(?), Birgitte Cornelia Rojahn, Louise Brun, Janny Grip Isachsen, Fredrikke Louise Nielsen and Benedicte Hundevadt. Photo by Hans Krum. NTNU University Library.

Janny Grip Isachsen (27 January 1835 - 1 July 1894) was a Norwegian stage actress.

Janny Grip Isachsen was engaged at the Det norske Theater (Bergen) in 1852–58, Christiania Norwegian Theatre 1860–62, Throndhjems Theater 1862–65, Christiania Theatre 1865-70 and Christiania Folketheater in 1872.

In 1853, she was married to actor and playwright Andreas Hornbeck Isachsen (1829–1903).

== Other sources ==
- Jensson, Liv (1981) Biografisk skuespillerleksikon. Norske, danske og svenske skuespillere på norske scener særlig på 1800-talle (Oslo: Universitetsforlaget) ISBN 82-00-05622-8.
