= Benedicte Hundevadt =

Norwegian actress and concert singer

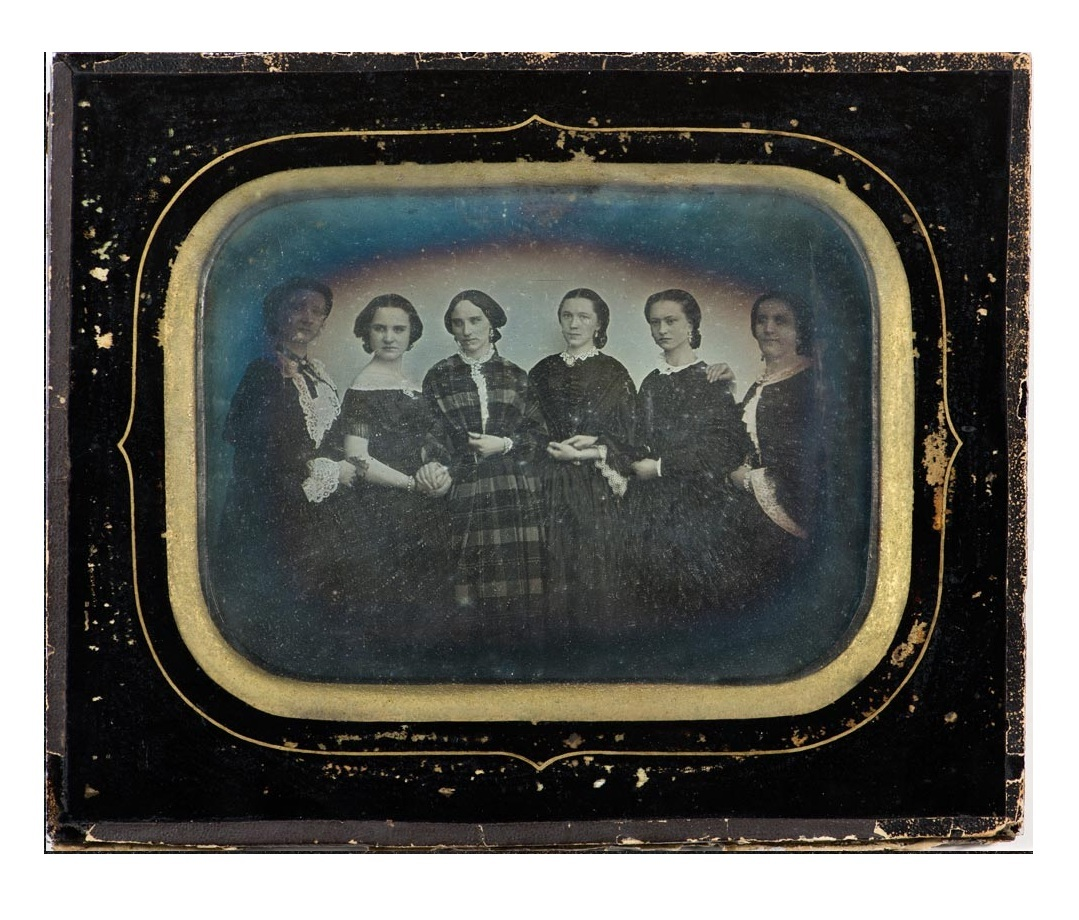
Daguerreotype of actresses associated with the early Norwegian theatre scene, 1856. From left: Ms. Sørensen(?), Birgitte Cornelia Rojahn, Louise Brun, Janny Grip Isachsen, Fredrikke Louise Nielsen and Benedicte Hundevadt. Photograph by Hans Krum, NTNU University Library.

Benedicte Hundevadt (21 March 1829 – 26 October 1883) was a Norwegian stage actress and concert singer associated with several early Norwegian theatre institutions during the 19th century.

Born in Bergen, Norway, Hundevadt was active in the development of Norwegian theatre during the mid-1800s. She was engaged at Det norske Theater (Bergen) from 1850 to 1854, and later performed at the Christiania Norwegian Theatre between 1855 and 1860. In 1861, she also appeared temporarily at the Christiania Theatre.

Following her theatre career, Hundevadt became active as a concert singer and gained recognition for her musical performances.

She died on 26 October 1883 in Horten, Norway.
