= Rojahn =

Rojahn is a surname. Notable people with the surname include:

- Birgitte Cornelia Rojahn (née Gulbrandsen; 1839–1927), Norwegian stage actress, concert singer and voice trainer, wife of
  Ferdinand A. Rojahn (1822–1900), German musician, organist, violinist and conductor

== Also ==
- Ernst Rojahn (1909–1977), Norwegian chess player

== See also ==
- Rojan (disambiguation)
