= Fredrikke Nielsen =

Norwegian actress

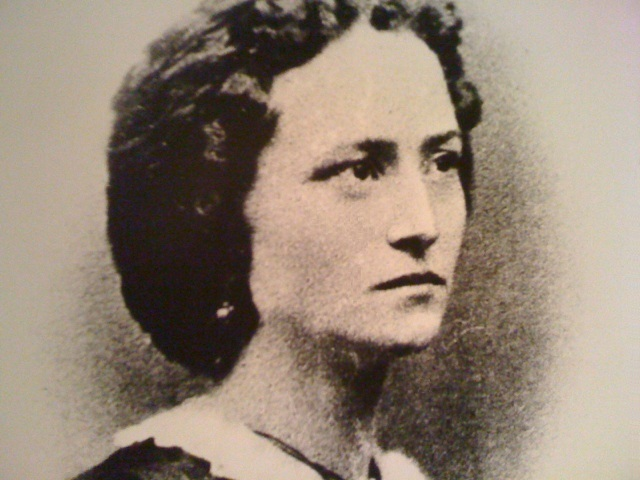
- Fredrikke Nielsen's portrait in the 1850s. The Theatre archive, University of Bergen.
- Born: Fredrikke Louise Jensen; 5 July 1837; Norway Haugesund
- Died: July 7, 1912 (aged 75)
- Occupations: Actress and preacher
- Years active: 1853–1880 (actress)
- Spouse: Harald Nielsen (actor)

Fredrikke Louise Nielsen (born Fredrikke Louise Jensen July 5, 1837, in Haugesund, died July 7, 1912, in Bergen), was a popular Norwegian actress and a women's pioneer. She played more than 300 roles in her twenty-six-year-long career, and was personally directed by both Henrik Ibsen and Bjørnstjerne Bjørnson. Ibsen chose her to play Signe, one of the lead characters in The Feast at Solhaug (1856), which was his first audience success. In 1880, Nielsen left the stage and joined the Methodist Movement in Bergen. She now became a preacher, first in Scandinavia, and later in the United States. She felt a strong social commitment and used the pulpit for preaching other topics than religion, such as women's and children's rights.

Fredrikke Nielsen was married to actor Harald Nielsen. She is also the great-grandmother of artist Gunnar Haugland.

== The Norwegian Theatre, 1853–1861 ==
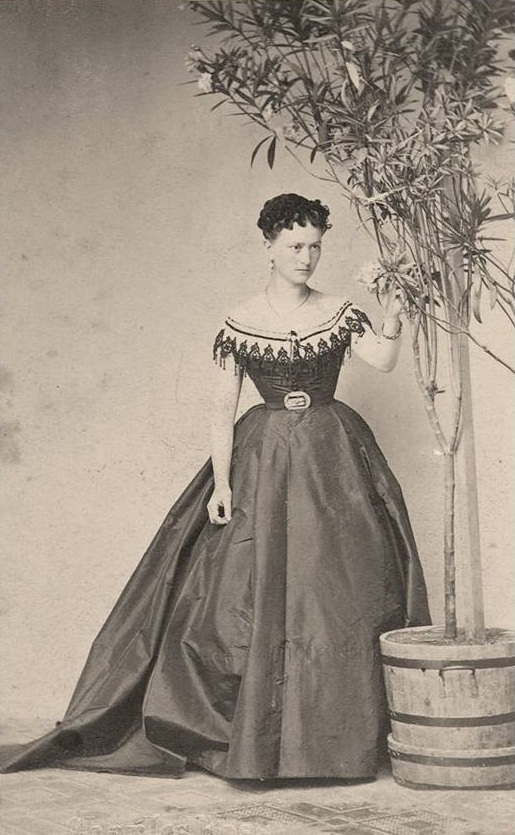
Fredrikke Nielsen as a teenager. Owned by Nora Schwabe-Hansen.

Fredrikke Nielsen had her debut at The Norwegian Theatre (Det norske Theater) in Bergen December 14, 1853, in the play How she can lie. She was only sixteen years old, but shortly afterward she got permanent employment at the theatre. She quickly won the hearts of the Bergen audience and professor in art history, Lorentz Dietrichson, called her «Poetry personified on stage». (Noreng 1998:8). Nielsen stayed at the theatre in Bergen from 1853 to 1861. She was a highly respected tragedienne, and played several important roles, such as Rosalind in Shakespeare's As You Like It and Hjørdis in Ibsen's The Vikings at Helgeland.

From 1853 to 1857 Fredrikke Nielsen was regularly directed by Henrik Ibsen. She developed a confidential relationship with him, and several examples of this can be found in her memoirs. She had great respect for him, both as a playwright and director. What he taught her at an early age, she later used in her own acting for the rest of her career. During the premiere of The Feast at Solhaug, she writes that Ibsen approached her as she walked nervously in the wings waiting for her cue. He held his hands over her head, and said: "Let all the Lord's angels be with you" (Nielsen 1998:90), before he pushed her out on stage.

== Henrik Ibsen's muse ==
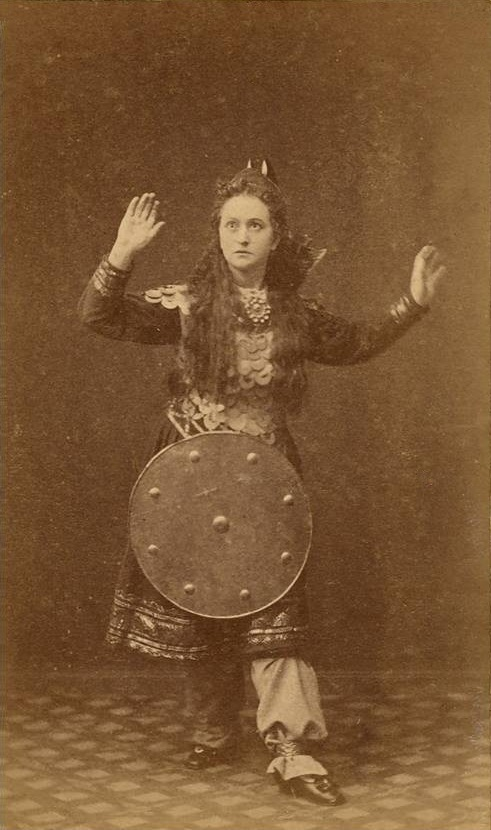
Fredrikke Nielsen in the role as Hjørdis in The Vikings at Helgeland on The Norwegian Theatre in Bergen, 1859. The Theatre archive, University of Bergen.

Both professor Arild Haaland and psychologist Arne Duve almost took for granted that there must have been a romantic connection between Fredrikke and the young Henrik Ibsen (Duve 1977, Haaland 1978:173). Professor Harald Noreng, who published her memoirs, also points to a possible relationship between the two. He has, specifically referring to the later contemporary dramas, added a chapter where he strongly suggests that Fredrikke may have inspired the playwright. Noreng draws several parallels between her dramatic life and Ibsen's works. Examples of close biographical connections with Ibsen's female dramatic characters can be found in plays like: Olaf Liljekrans, The Vikings at Helgeland, Love's Comedy, Ghosts, The Wild Duck, The Lady from the Sea and When We Dead Awaken. (Noreng 1998:110–158). Ibsen left Bergen 1857, and after that it is not known whether the two ever met again. What we do know is that Fredrikke Nielsen, 69 years old, went to Kristiania in 1906 to take part in Henrik Ibsen's funeral. She stood in line with ten thousands of other people who wanted to show their respect at his lit de parade. Here she made a short speech, where she thanked him for the roles, and put down a small bouquet of wildflowers.

== Marriage and family ==
November 27, 1856, Fredrikke Nielsen married actor Harald Andreas Nielsen. The couple had ten children, but only five of them reached adulthood.

== Trondheim, 1861–1876 ==
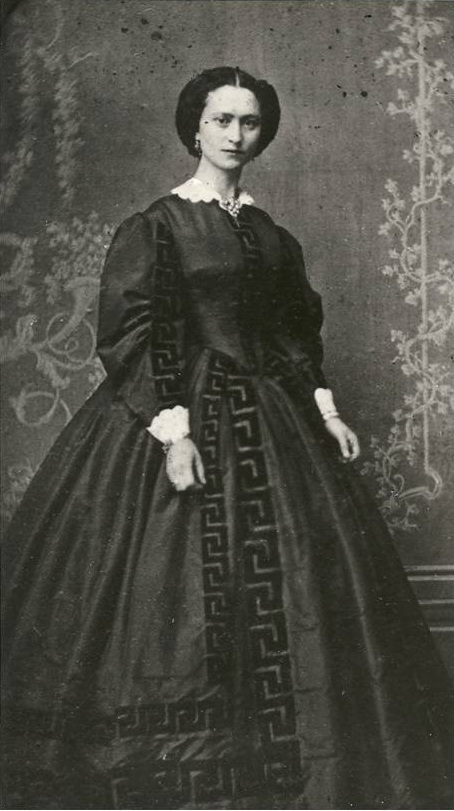
Fredrikke Nielsen in a nice gown, ca. 1860. The Theatre Archives, The University of Bergen.

In 1861 Fredrikke Nielsen and her husband moved house to work at The Norwegian Theatre in Trondheim.

When the theatre went bankrupt, Harald Nielsen started his own theatre, where Fredrikke Nielsen played great roles. She also travelled on her own and had guest appearances on all the greatest stages in Scandinavia. She also made dramatic readings. They lived in Trondheime until 1876, when she was hired by the new National Stage (Den Nationale Scene) in Bergen, and the family moved back to her hometown.

== The National Stage 1876–1880 ==
On October 27, 1876, Fredrikke Nielsen played Hjørdis in Ibsen's The Vikings at Helgeland at the opening show at The National Stage in Bergen. Actress Octavia Sperati remembered that "Mrs. Fredrikke Nielsen's imaginative and demonic Hjørdis was very effective …" (Sperati 1911:89). Professor Harald Noreng has also mentioned that Fredrikke Nielsen in this play was able to expose the "dark and aggressive aspects of her artistic temperament …" (Noreng 1998:114). in the following four years, Nielsen was the theatre's leading prima donna.

== Methodist preacher and women's pioneer ==
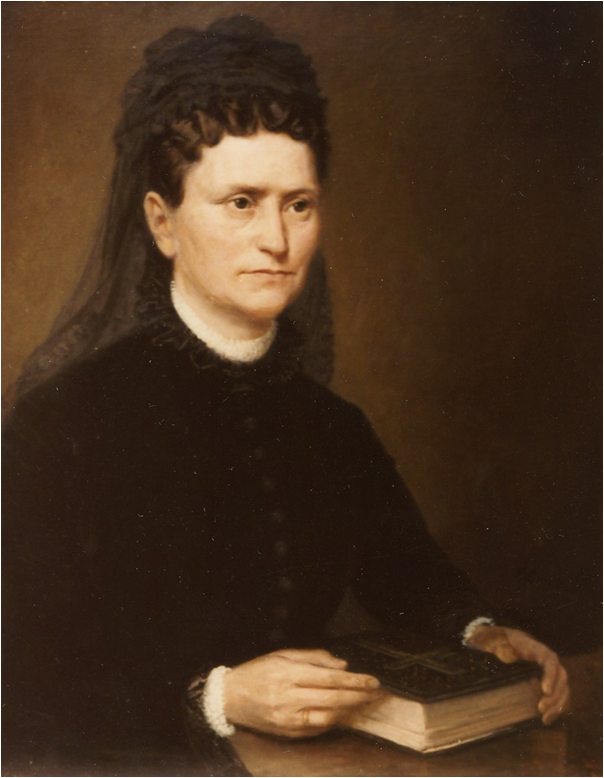
The Preacher. Oil painting by Knud Bergslien. The Theatre Archives, The University of Bergen. From around 1878 Fredrikke Nielsen started to seek the Methodists in Bergen, after her eldest son urged her mother to "leave the stage and follow the Lord."

Around the same time, the theatre at last decided to stage Ibsen's long denounced play Love's Comedy. Fredrikke Nielsen had probably recognized aspects of herself in the play's protagonist, Svanhild, when the controversial piece came out, and therefore had learned all the lines, but no theaters dared to put it up. Now sixteen years later, she was too old for her dream role, and was forced to play Svanhild's mother. This artistic defeat probably contributed to her entering into a deep existential crisis. The following year, she left her position at The National Stage, and June 17, 1880, she made her last performance, as Miss Bernick in Ibsen's The Pillars of Society. After that she never set her foot in a theater again. She underwent a religious revival, and became a Methodist preacher.

In the following thirty years, Fredrikke Nielsen travelled around preaching. First only in the Scandinavian countries, but after her husband died in 1881, she travelled to the United States. Here she preached for the Scandinavian Methodists, and managed to get through most of the continent.

Her social commitment led her to also use the pulpit for issues other than religion. She fought for women's rights, to better single mothers' role in society, for inheritance rights for children of single mothers and for the education and upbringing of children. She was a popular speaker and she also wrote newspaper articles about these issues. At a time when being a woman in itself could be a challenge, Fredrikke Nielsen continued to travel until the end of her life.

== Trivia ==
=== Wedding-song from Henrik Ibsen ===
When Fredrikke and Harald were married, Bergen Cathedral was filled with guests and people wanting to see the event. Henrik Ibsen wrote a song for the occasion:

Upon the stage — it's by ancient lore —
The play can properly be ended
When the conquering hero's come home from war
And won his "She", his intended!
One could believe life's poetry had ceased
Quite absolutely with the wedding feast.
The pair could well
Have ceased to dwell
From that day forth in Art's fair regions!

But look, in life that is never true,
The ideal there's continuation,
The bright, the beckoning heavenly blue
That claims all our concentration;
When church has blessed the vow two hearts have made
Then on their union there's a splendour laid;
Spring-like and rare,
Poesy-fair
Life lies ahead for the couple.

You twain, whom fire within your hearts
And churchly vow have just married,
Go, boldly tackle the real-life parts,
The variable scenes to be carried, —
But if at times the problems prove severe —
Keep up the spirit that inspires you here,
Then without trace
Of fear you'll face
The time for bringing down the curtain!
Henrik Ibsen

=== Lost memoirs ===
Fredrikke Nielsen wrote her memoirs and left a large manuscript when she died. It was accepted at Gyldendal in Copenhagen, and the book was about to be printed when family withdrew it at the last minute. Of fear of scandal, the complete manuscript was destroyed. In 1980, a stack of yellow papers surfaced in the attic of Fredrikke Nielsen's grandson in California. This turned out to be a Swedish translation of the first third, meant for Scandinavian Methodists in the United States. Luckily this was the part of the memoirs containing her childhood, her theatre debut, and the years working with Henrik Ibsen. Professor Harald Noreng acquired the manuscript, and in 1998 it was released by the publishing house Novus in Oslo.

== Galleri ==
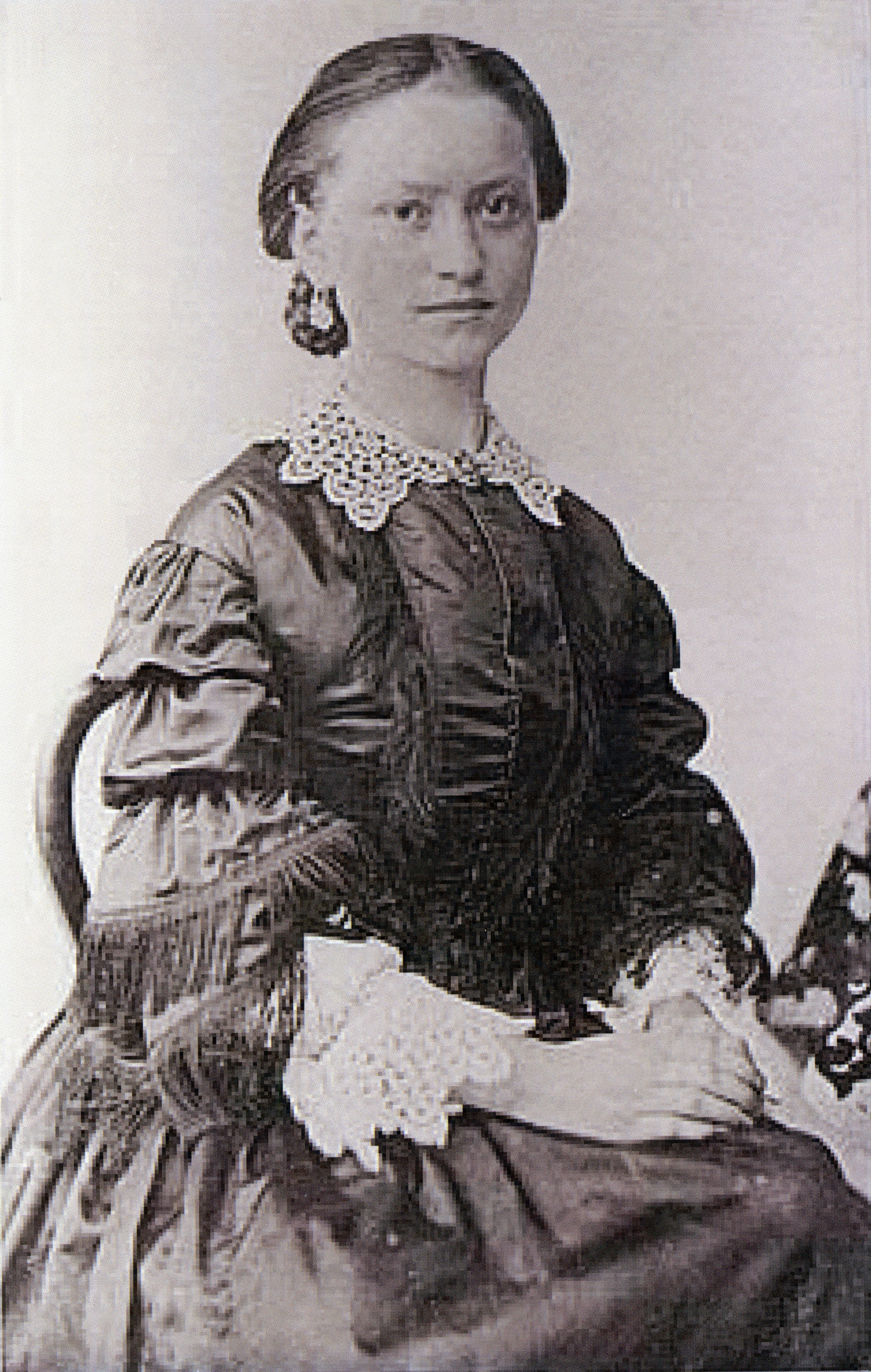
The earliest photo of Fredrikke Nielsen. Private owner.

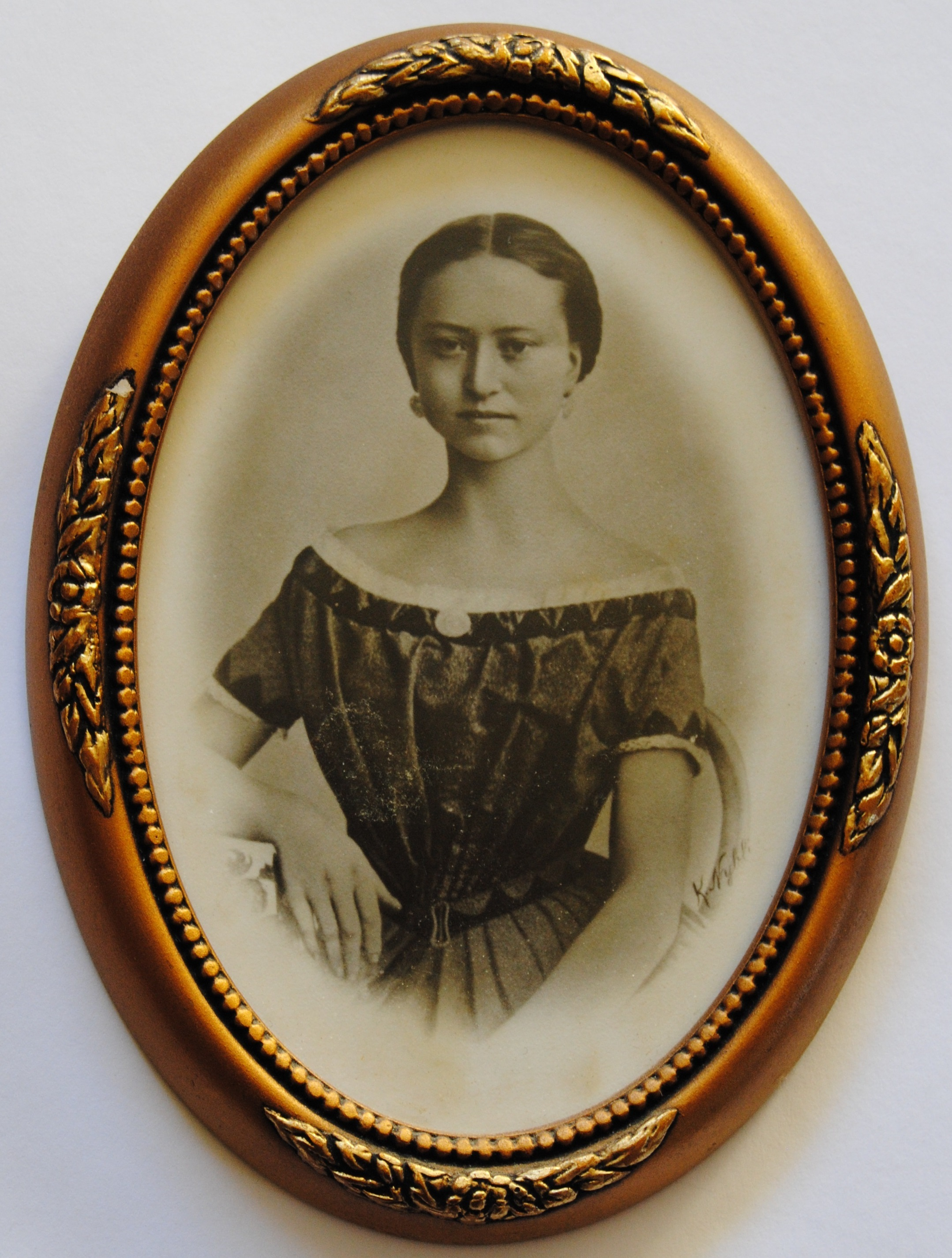
An early photo of Fredrikke Nielsen in golden frame. Private owner.

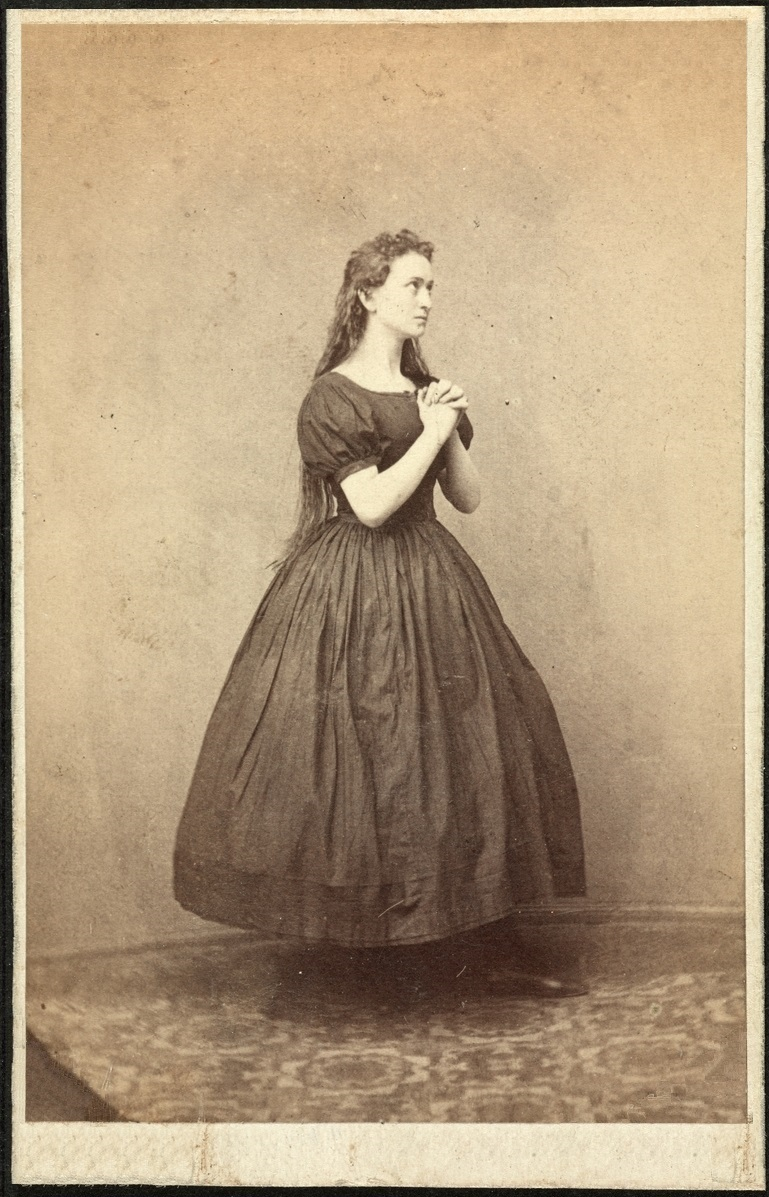
Fredrikke Nielsen in her favourite role play as Jane Eyre, c. 1860. Photo by Andreas Mathias Anderssen.

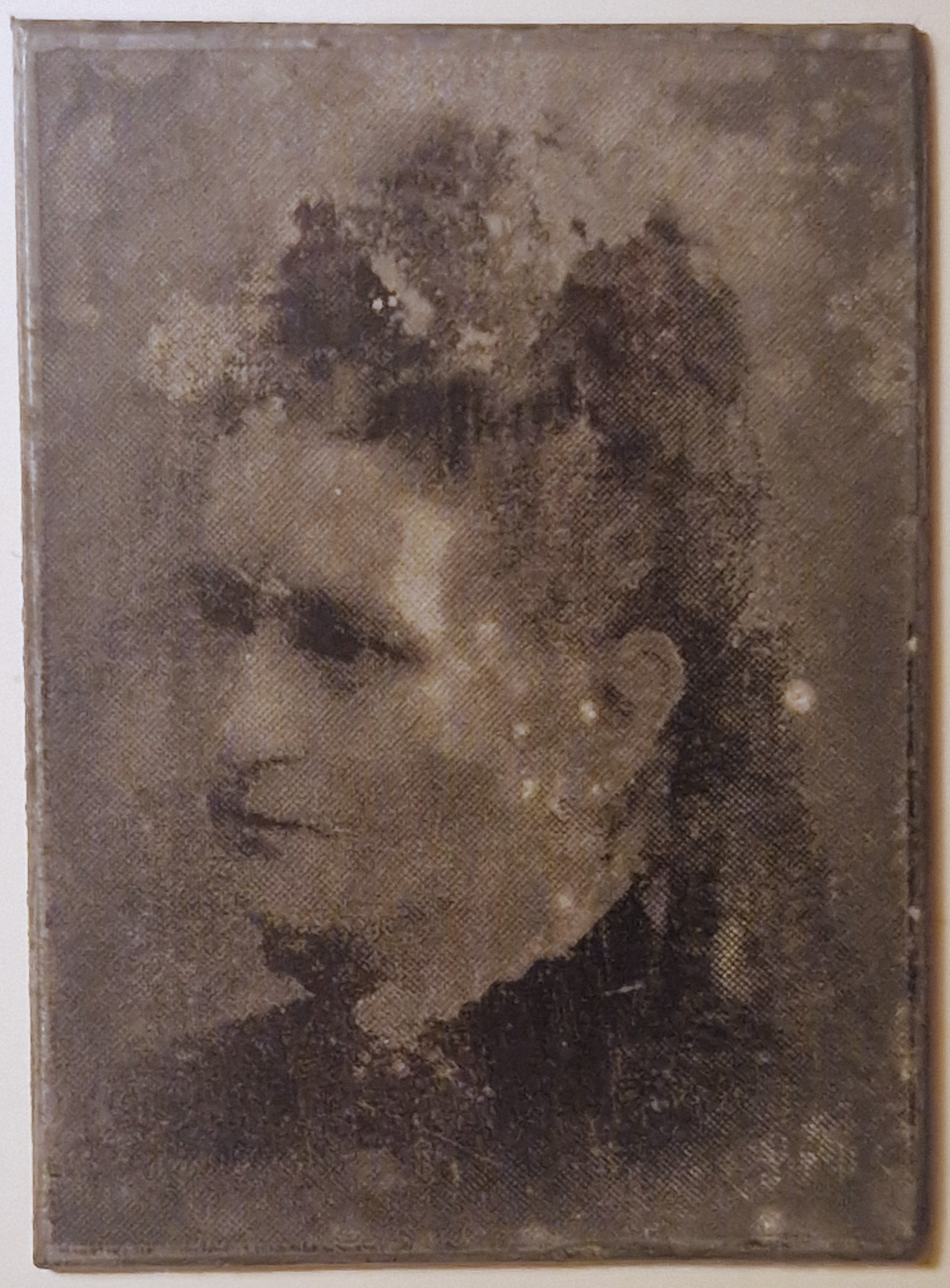
Daguerreotypi of Fredrikke Nielsen from the 1860-ies. Taken by unknown. Brita Rojahn (owner).

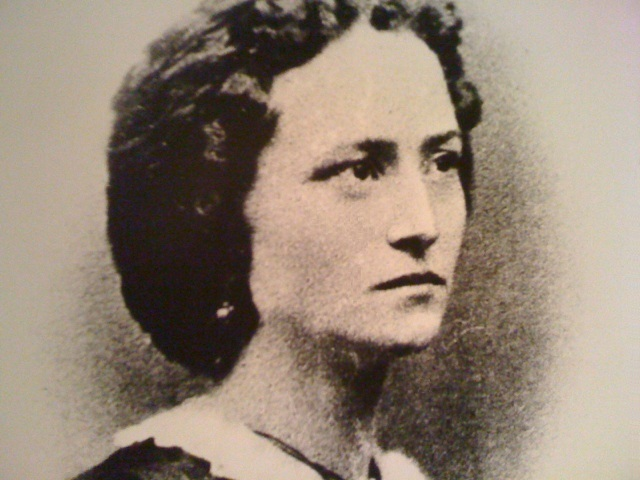
Fredrikke Nielsen in Bergen, ca 1860. Photo by Andreas Mathias Anderssen. The Theatre Archives, University of Bergen.

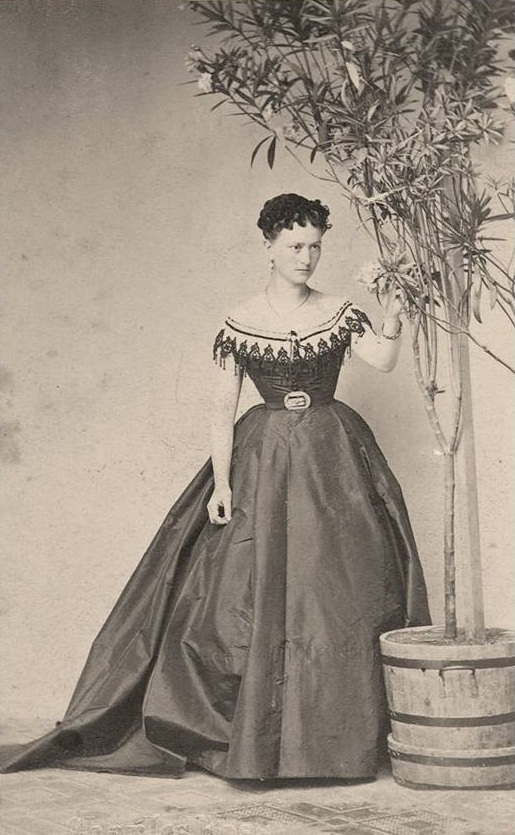
Fredrikke Nielsen in Trondheim, ca 1855. Photo by Charles Foss. Nora Schwabe-Hansen (owner).

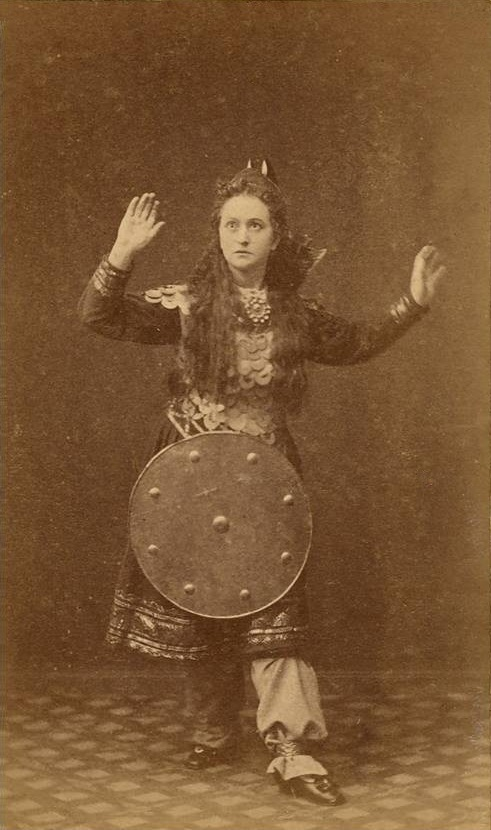
Fredrikke Nielsen as Hjørdis in The Vikings at Helgeland at The Norwegian Theater, 1859. Photo by Harald Nielsen (?). The Theatre Archives, University of Bergen.

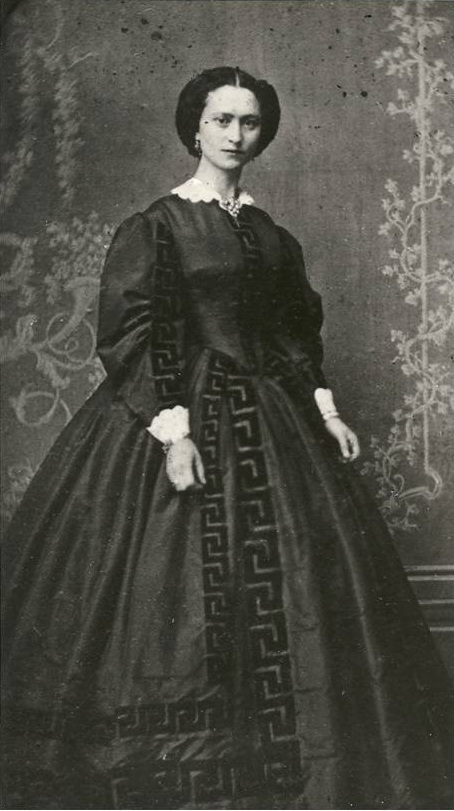
Portrait of Fredrikke Nielsen in nice gown, c. 1865. Photo by Hans Krum(?). The Theatre Archives, University of Bergen.

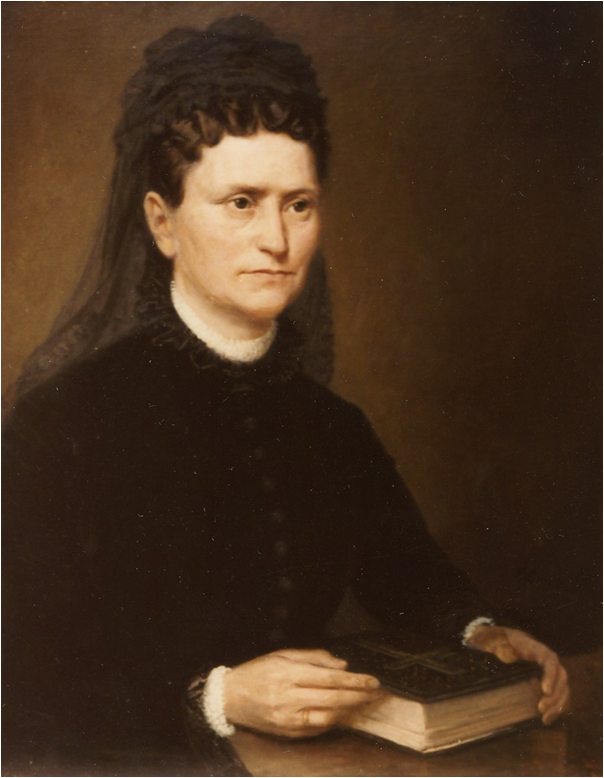
The Preacher. Oil painting by Knud Bergslien. The Theatre Archives, University of Bergen.

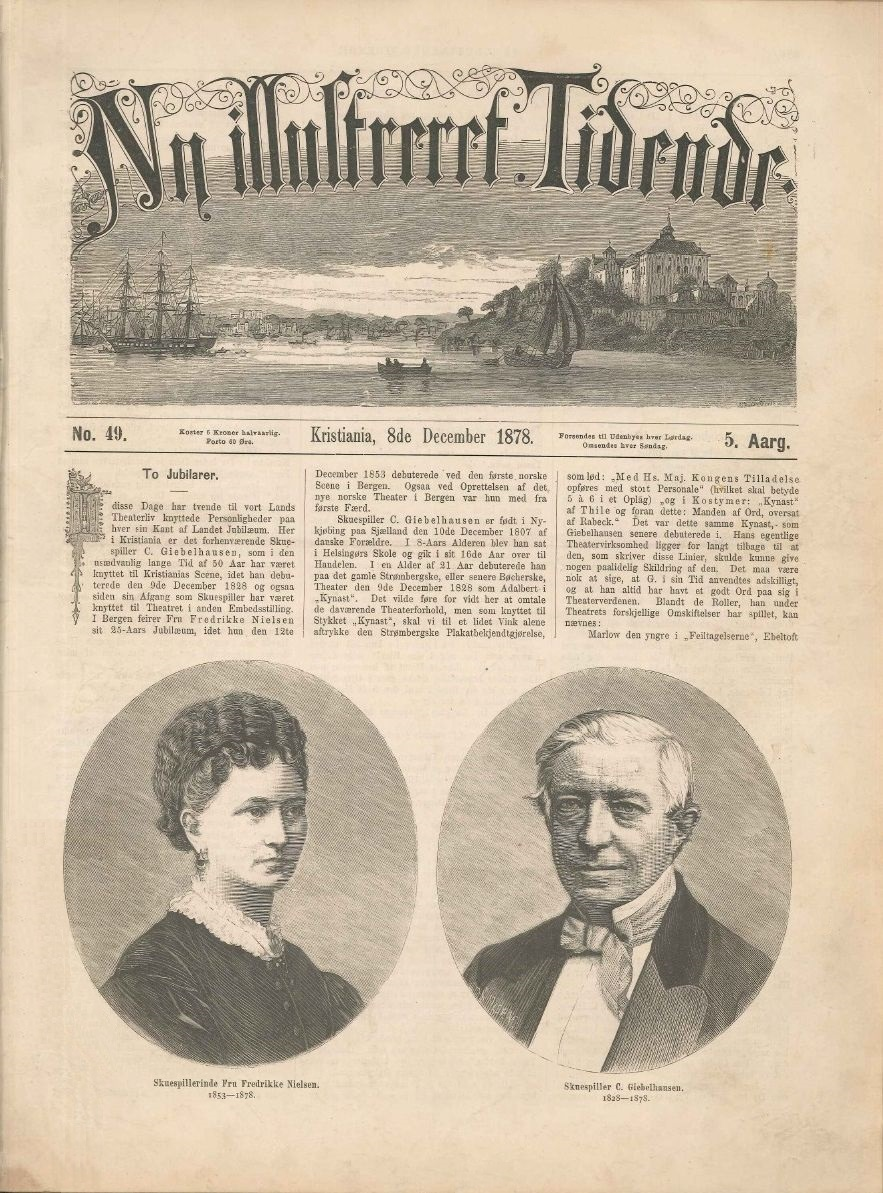
Ny illustreret Tidende No. 49. 8. December 1878. Xylograph by Hans Christian Olsen. Norsk Folkemuseum, The Ibsen Museum, Oslo.

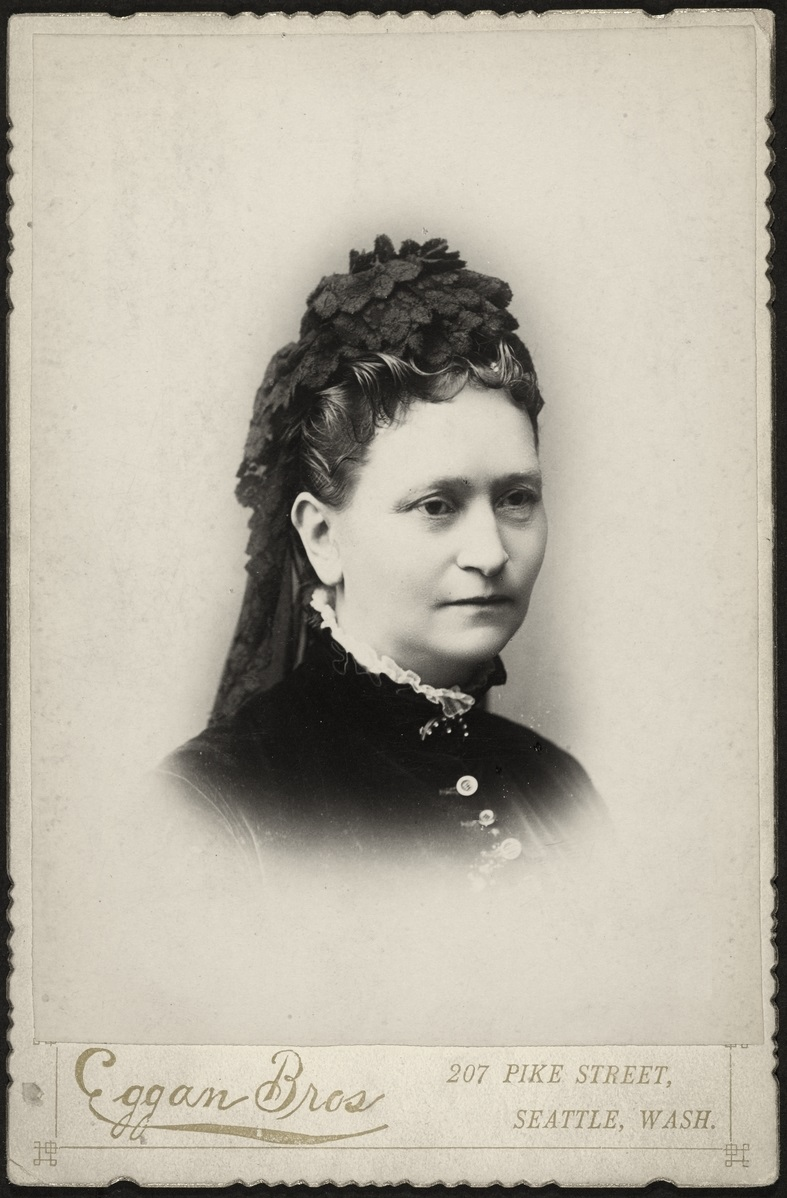
Portrait photo by Eggan Bros, Washington. Oslo Museum TM.T01700.

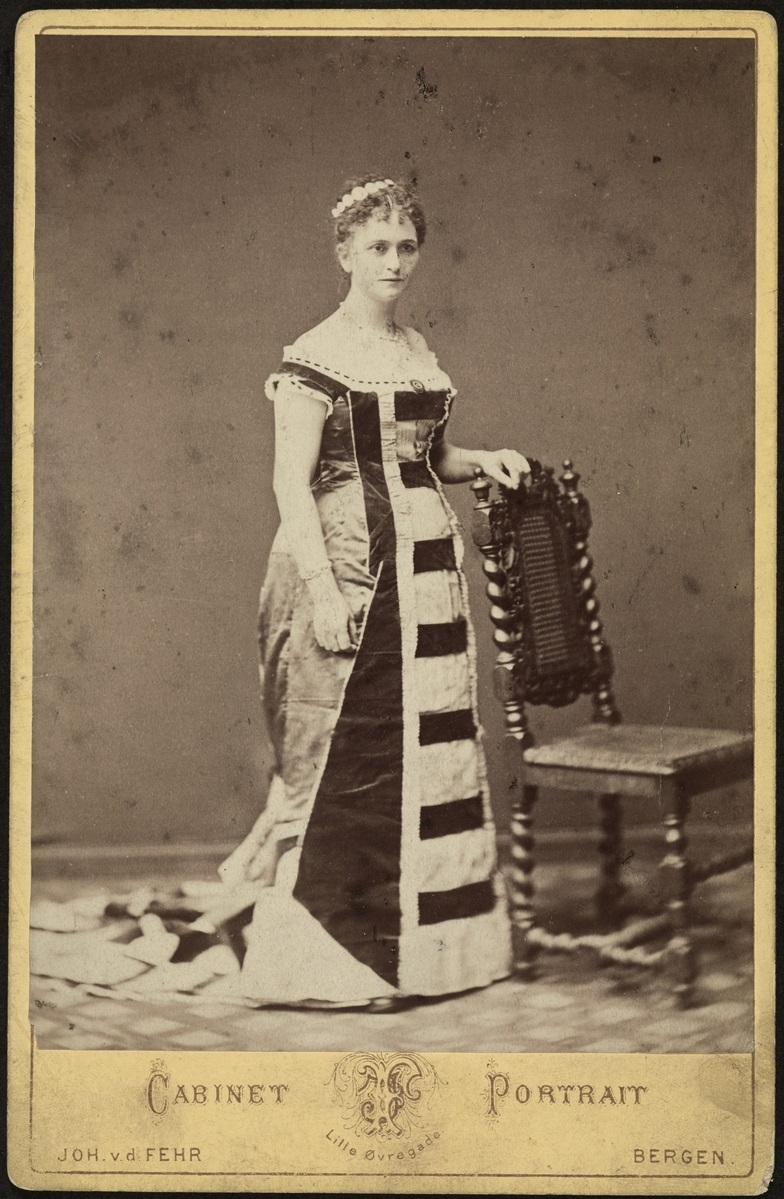
Cabinet photo by Joh. Van der Fehr. Oslo Museum TM.T01698.

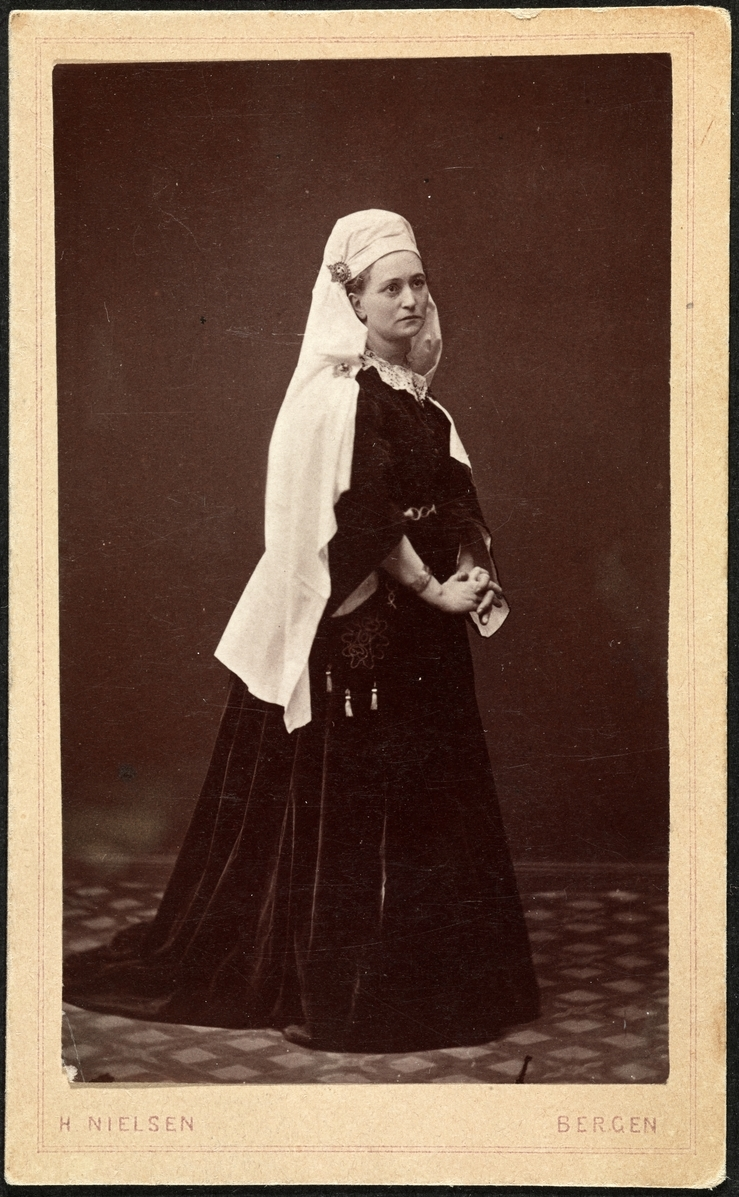
Fredrikke Nielsen's photo taken in Bergen in the 1870-ies by Harald Nielsen, Oslo Museum TM.T.02156a.

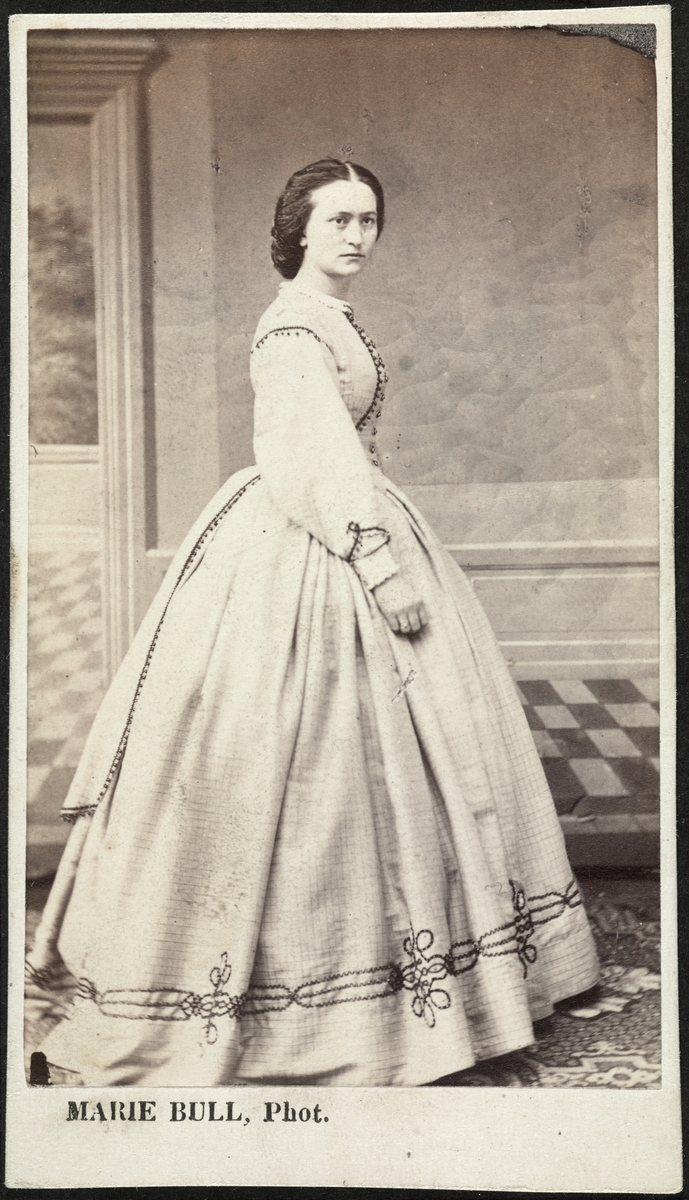
Fredrikke Nielsen's portrait taken by earlier actress, Marie Midling Bull in Bergen. Oslo Museum TM.T01253.

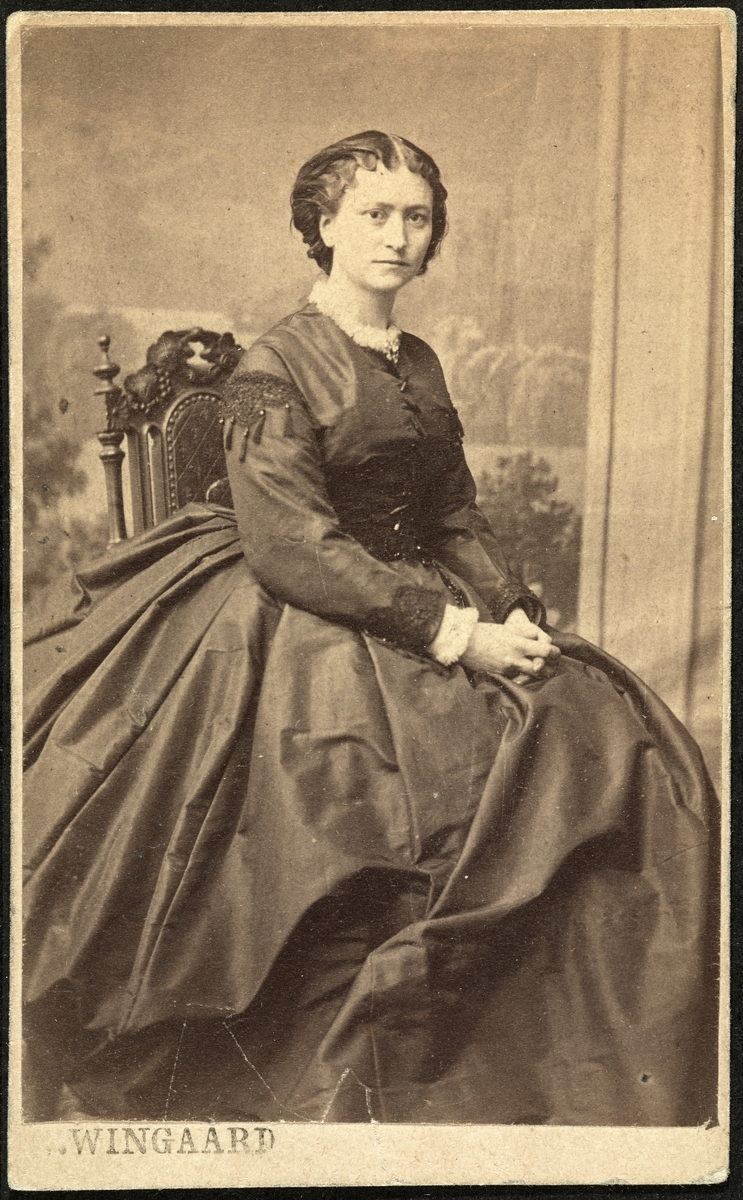
Photo of Fredrikke Nielsen taken by N. Wingaard. Oslo Museum TN.T.01251.

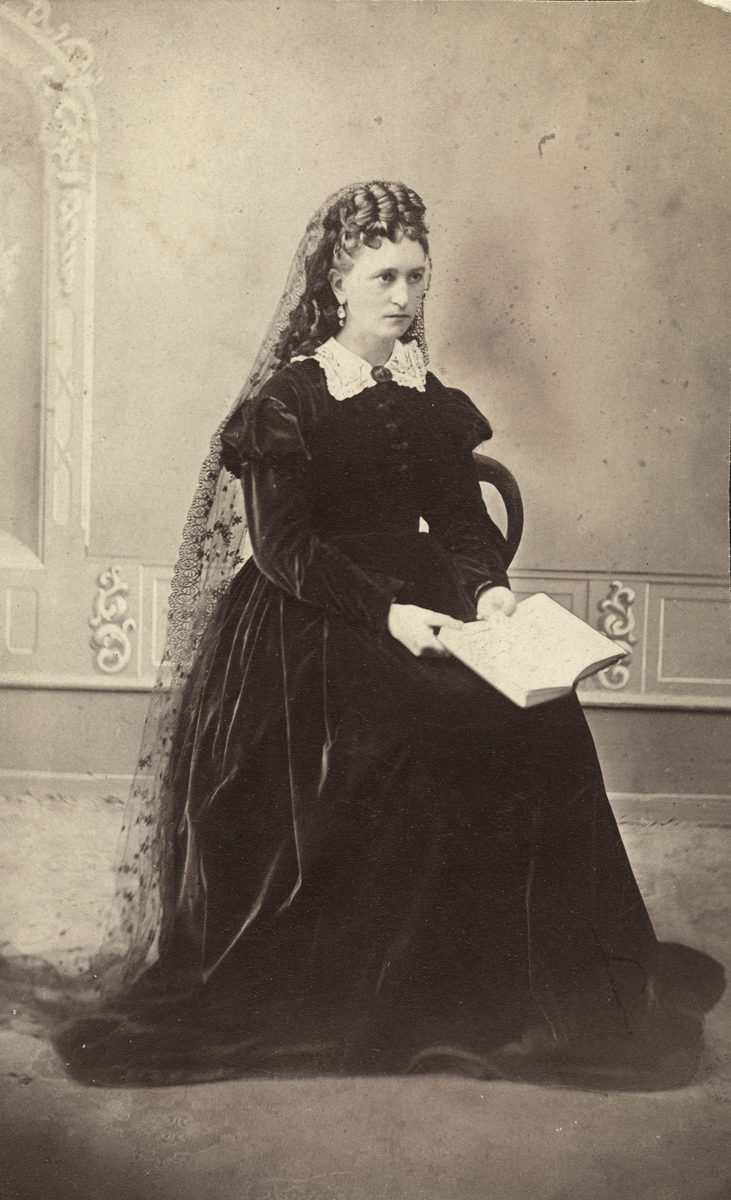
Fredrikke Nielsen with a book on her knees. Oslo Museum TM.T01696.

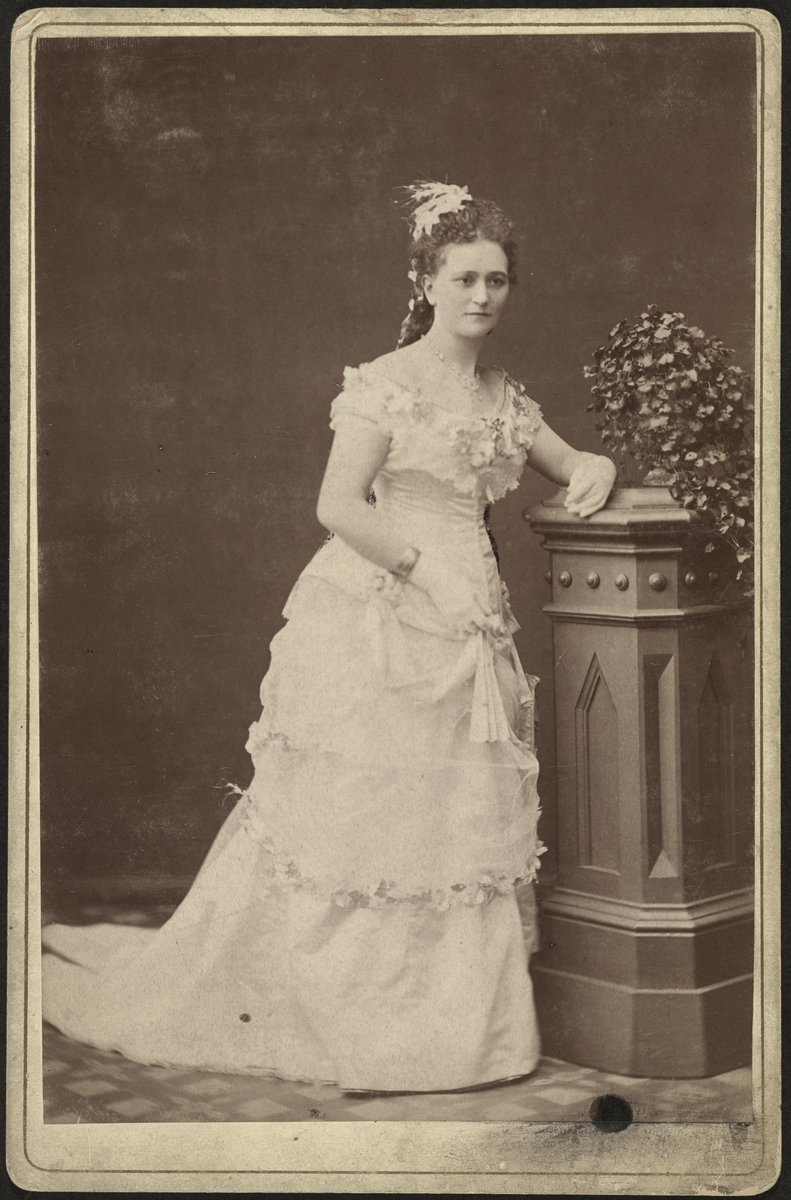
Fredrikke Nielsen by a pedestal. Oslo Museum TM.T01697.

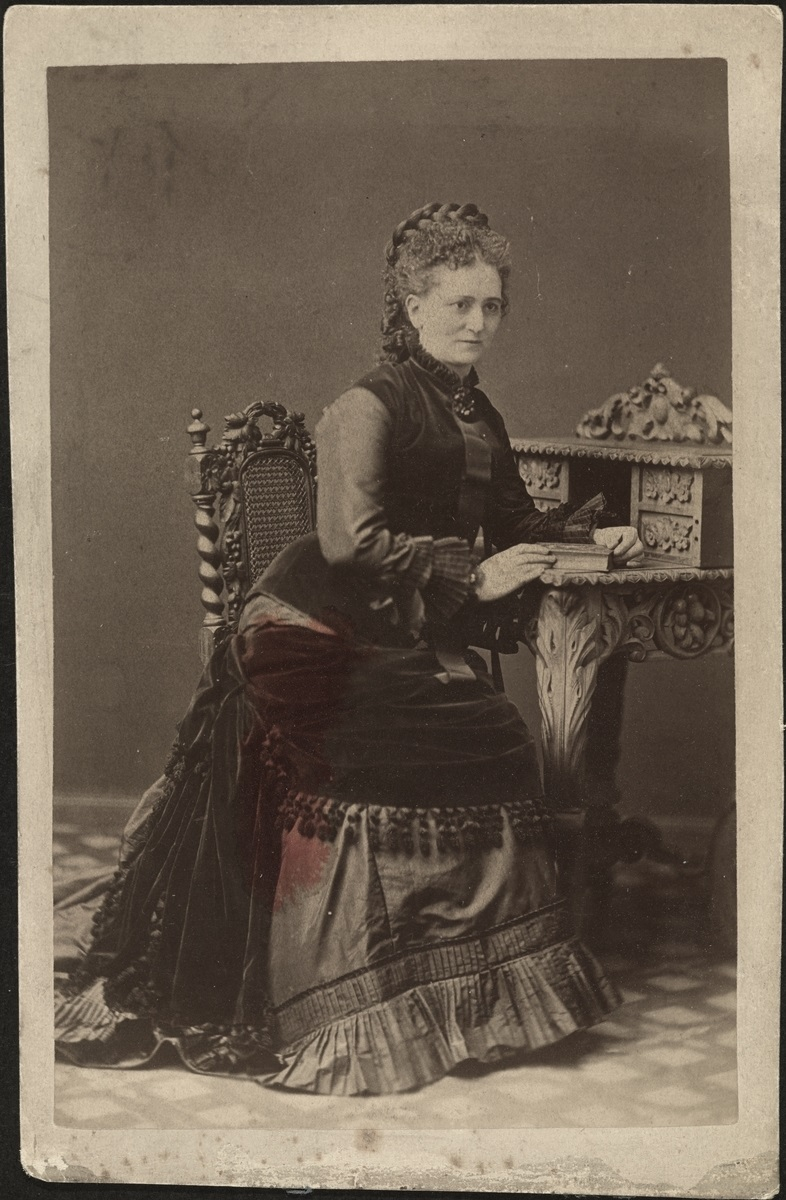
Fredrikke Nielsen at the desk. Oslo Museum TM.T01699a.

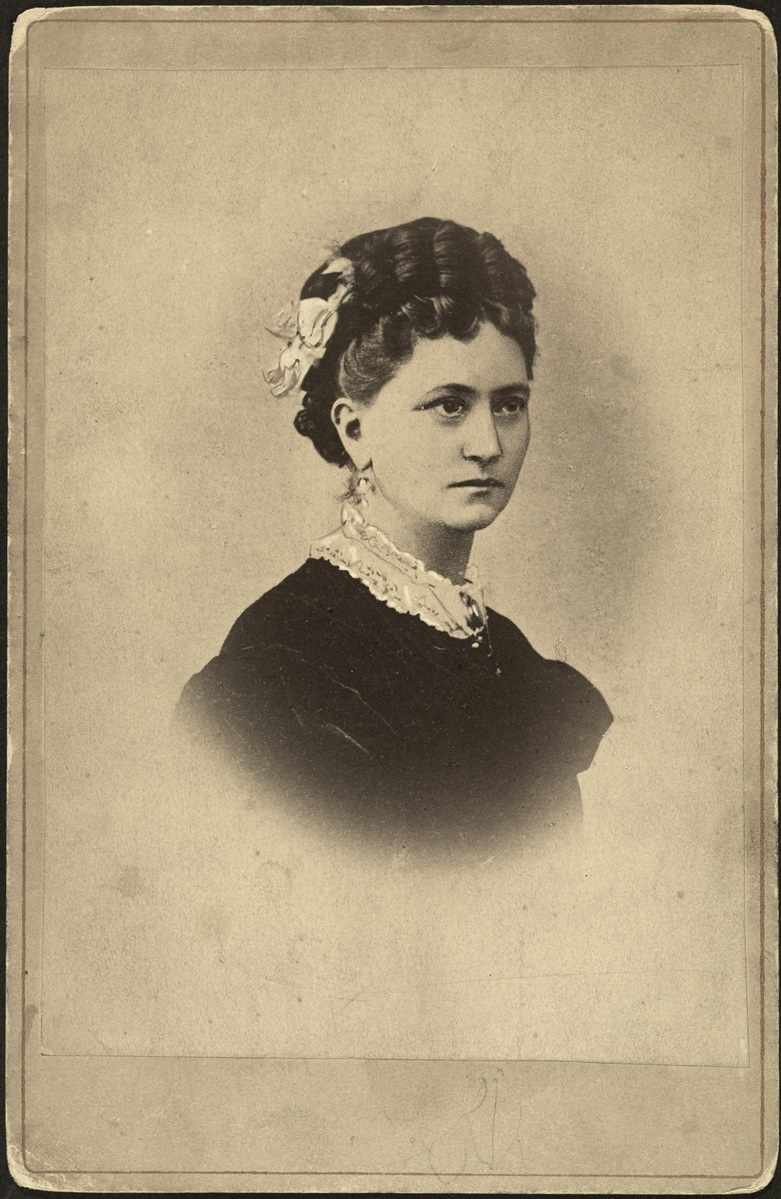
Visit card photography by Harald Nielsen. Oslo Museum TM.T01695.

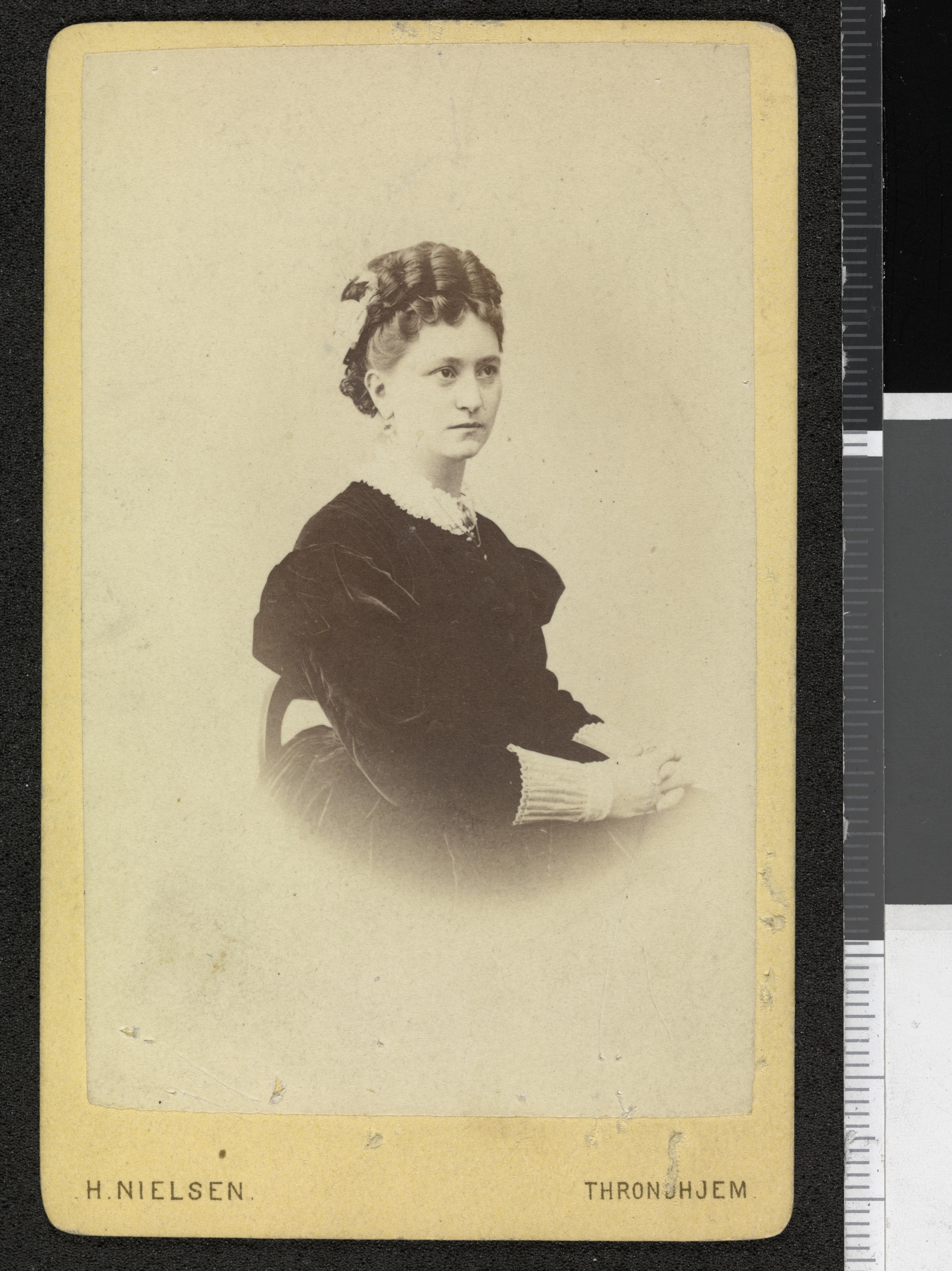
Visit card photography by Harald Nielsen. The National Library.

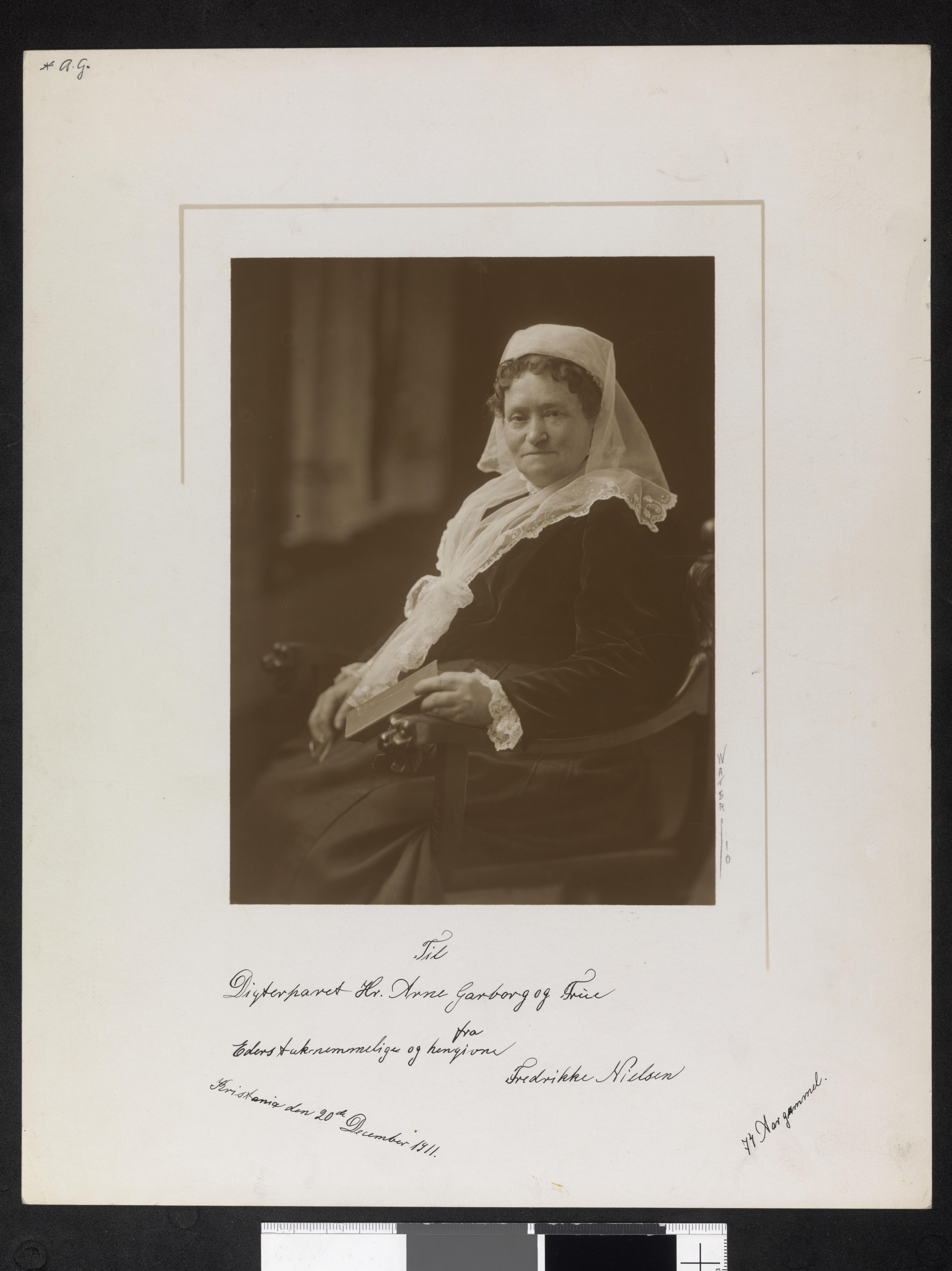
Fredrikke Nielsen 74 years old. Greeting to the married author couple Hulda and Arne Garborg, dated 20. December 1911. The National Library.

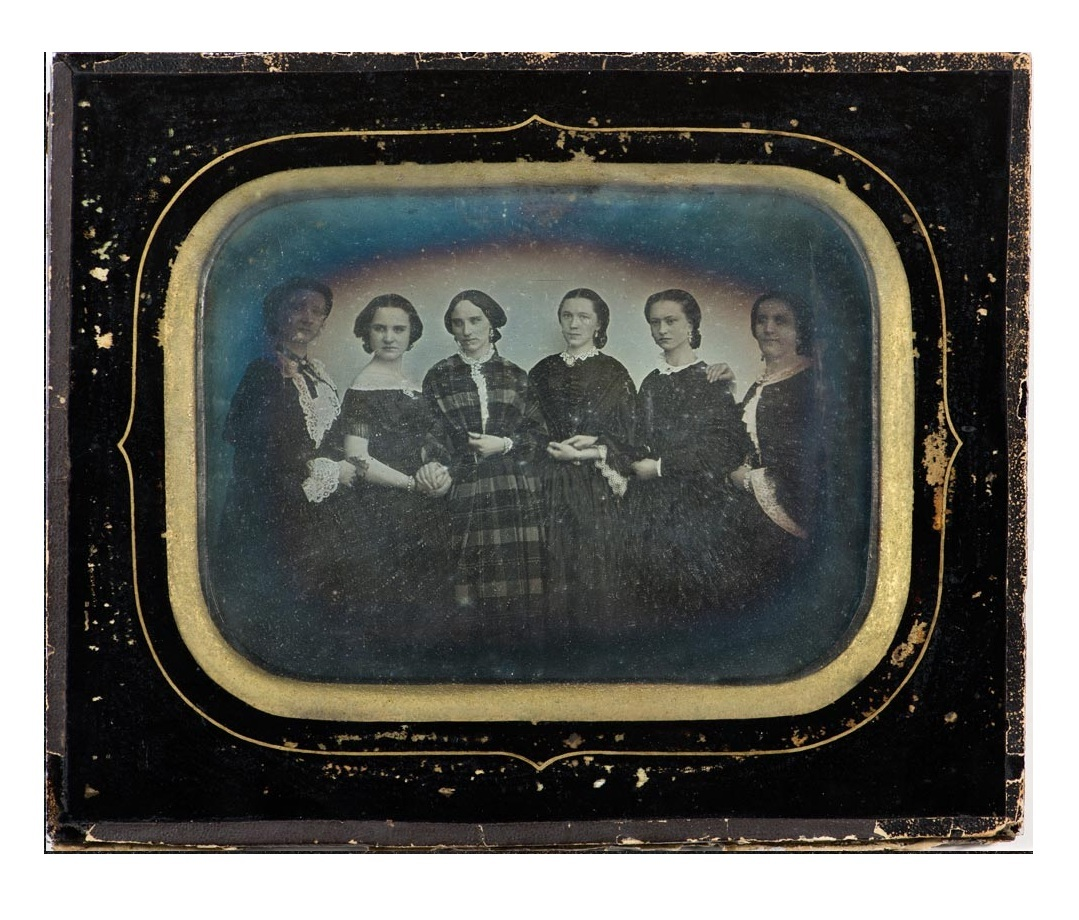
Daguerreotype of the actresses at the first Norwegian Theater, 1856. From left: Ms. Sørensen(?), Birgitte Cornelia Rojahn, Louise Brun, Janny Grip Isachsen, Fredrikke Louise Nielsen and Benedicte Hundevadt. Photo by Hans Krum. NTNU University Library.

== Bibliography ==
- Blanc, Tharald: Norges første nationale Scene (Bergen 1850-1863). Et Bidrag til den norske dramatiske Kunsts Historie. Kristiania 1884. Albert Cammermeyer.
- Blytt, Peter: Minder fra den første norske Scene i Bergen i 1850-Aarene. (2. opl.). 1907.
- Duve, Arne: The Real Drama Of Henrik Ibsen? Oslo 1977. Lanser.
- Edvardsen, Erik Henning: «Kjærlighedens Komedie, Illustreret Nyhedsblad og Hollenderkretsen» (s. 103–134) In: Eivind Tjønneland (red): "Gloria Amoris. Henrik Ibsens Kjærlighedens Komedie 150 år". Bergen 2012. Alvheim & Eide Akademisk Forlag. ISBN 978-82-90359-87-9
- Folkebladet: «Den første nationale Scene i Bergen» (s. 19-28). Folkebladet No. 2. 31te Januar 1900.
- Garmann, Fredrik: En skuespillers Oplevelser. Erindringer fra mit theaterliv ved Holger Sinding. Kristiania 1900. Aschehoug.
- Haaland, Arild: Ibsens verden. Oslo 1978. Gyldendal Norsk Forlag. ISBN 82-05-10868-4
- Heggøy, Willy: Den skjønne Fredrikke. Om Fredrikke Nielsen. Nasjonalbiblioteket NBO Ms. 4° 4305.
- HIS = Henrik Ibsens skrifter. [i.e. Collected Works].
- Jensson, Inger: Biografisk skuespillerleksikon. Norske, danske og svenske skuespillere på norske scener særlig på 1800-tallet. Oslo, Bergen, Tromsø. Universitetsforlaget.
- Nielsen, Fredrikke: Minnen från min barndom och mina första ungdomsår. Ibsenhuset og Grimstad Bymuseum. Skrifter nr. 7. Oslo 1998. Novus Forlag. ISBN 82-7099-294-1 (h).
- Noreng, Harald: Tillegg. Henrik Ibsens diktning i Fredrikke Nielsens liv og Fredrikke Nielsens liv Henrik Ibsens diktning. I: Fredrikke Nielsen: op. cit.. Oslo 1998.
- Sperati, Octavia: Teatererindringer. Gyldendalske Boghandel, nordisk Forlag. Kristiania og Kjøbenhavn 1911.
- Sperati, Octavia: Fra det gamle Komediehus. Gyldendalske Boghandel, nordisk Forlag. Kristiania og Kjøbenhavn 1916.
