= Rojan =

Rojan may refer to:

- Rojan, Iran, a village
- Rojan, pen name of Feodor Stepanovich Rojankovsky (1891–1970), illustrator of children's books and erotica
- Rojan, a character in the Star Trek episode "By Any Other Name"

== See also ==
- Rojahn, a surname
