= Love's Comedy =

1862 comedy by Henrik Ibsen

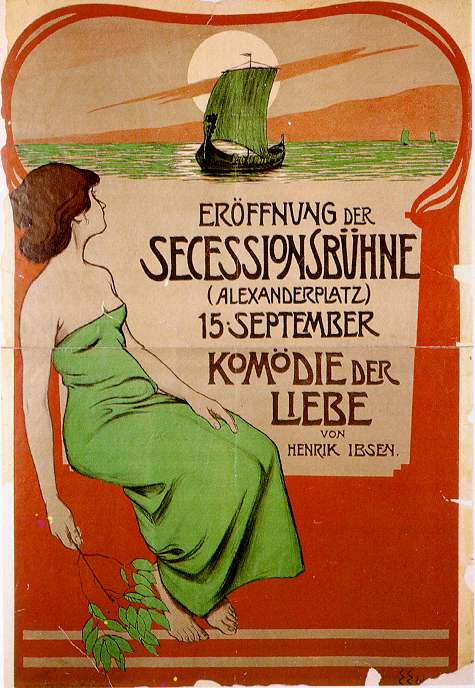
- Poster to Love's Comedy (Komödie der Liebe), made by Edmund Edel (1863-1934) to the opening performance at Berliner Secessionsbühne 15 September 1900.
- Original language: Norwegian
- Written by: Henrik Ibsen
- Subject: Love and Marriage
- Genre: Comedy

Premiere
- Date: 24 November 1873
- Place: Christiania Theatre (Oslo, Norway)

Love's Comedy (Norwegian: Kjærlighedens Komedie) is a comedy by Henrik Ibsen. It was first published on 29 December 1862; the earliest version, Svanhild, dates to 1860. As a result of being branded an "immoral" work in the press, the Christiania Theatre would not dare to stage it at first. "The play aroused a storm of hostility," Ibsen wrote in its preface three years later, "more violent and more widespread than most books could boast of having evoked in a community the vast majority of whose members commonly regard matters of literature as being of small concern." The only person who approved of it at the time, Ibsen later said, was his wife. He revised the play in 1866, in preparation for its publication "as a Christmas book," as he put it. His decision to make it more appealing to Danish readers by removing many of its specifically Norwegian words has been taken as an early instance of the expression of his contempt for the contemporary Norwegian campaign to purge the language of its foreign influences.

The play received its first theatrical production in 1873 (eleven years after publication), opening on 24 November at the Christiania Theatre, with Sigvard Gundersen as Falk, Laura Gundersen as Svanhild, Johannes Brun as Pastor Strawman, and Andreas Isachsen as Guldstad. It became a regular part of the theatre's repertory, playing 77 times over the next 25 years. Its first Broadway production opened at the Hudson Theatre on 23 March 1908.

The London premiere of the play took place on 28 November 1905, when the New Stage Club mounted a production at the Cripplegate Institute in London (see review in Daily News, 29 November 1905). The same group had premiered Shaw's Philanderer there in February, with the same key women performers: Gwendolen Bishop, Millicent Murby, and Louise Salom.

Ibsen adopted a contemporary setting (for the first time since his St. John's Night of 1853) and a rhymed verse form for the play. Its language is loaded with vivid imagery and Ibsen gives the characters arias full of passion and poetry. It dramatises the bourgeois world seen in Ibsen's later naturalistic prose problem plays but Love's Comedy elevates its characters to an emblematic status, more akin to Emperor and Galilean, Brand or Peer Gynt; characters appear to be contemporary types but are given emblematic names such as Falcon, Swan, Strawman and Gold.

Ibsen called Love's Comedy an extension of his poem "On the Heights" ("Paa Vidurne"), insofar as both works explore a need for liberation; both, he suggested, were based on his relationship with his wife Suzanna. In 1870 he wrote that the play was "much debated in Norway, where people related it to the circumstances of my personal life. I lost a great deal of face." Robert Ferguson suggests that it is Ibsen's "greatest love story", adding that "our knowledge that [Falk] is lying, that he and Svandhild voluntarily turn to a future with this act of emotional self-mutilation [...] gives Love's Comedy such extraordinary poignancy". As "the brilliant culmination of a long and awkward apprenticeship," the play is, Brian Johnson writes, Ibsen's first "assured masterpiece".

== Plot summary ==
Two students – Falk and Lind – are staying at the country house of Mrs. Halm, romancing her two daughters Svanhild and Anna respectively. Lind has ambitions to be a missionary, Falk a great poet. Falk criticises bourgeois society in his verse and insists that we live in the passionate moment. Lind’s proposal of marriage to Anna is accepted, but Svanhild rejects the chance to become Falk’s muse, as poetry is merely writing, and he can do that on his own and without really risking himself for his beliefs.

Falk is liberated by his words and decides to put ideas into action. When Lind is persuaded by Anna’s friends not to leave as a missionary but stay in a cosy existence looking after his wife, Falk denounces the lot of them – saying that their marriages have nothing to do with love. Society is outraged and does not wish to be reminded of the split between ideal and reality. Falk is ostracized but Svanhild admires his courage. They plan to run off together and live the ideal.

The pastor Strawman and the clerk Styver attempt to dissuade Falk but the demands of respectability and security cannot assuage him. Finally, the rich businessman Guldstad asks whether their relationship can survive the waning of the first flush of love. Falk and Svanhild admit that it cannot and Svanhild accepts Guldstad’s proposal of a safe, financially secure marriage rather than sully the experience of her love for Falk by seeing it die. Falk leaves to write songs which celebrate an untainted love and Svanhild sits gloomily amongst the world of convention – a housewife who once had passion and now lives on its memory.

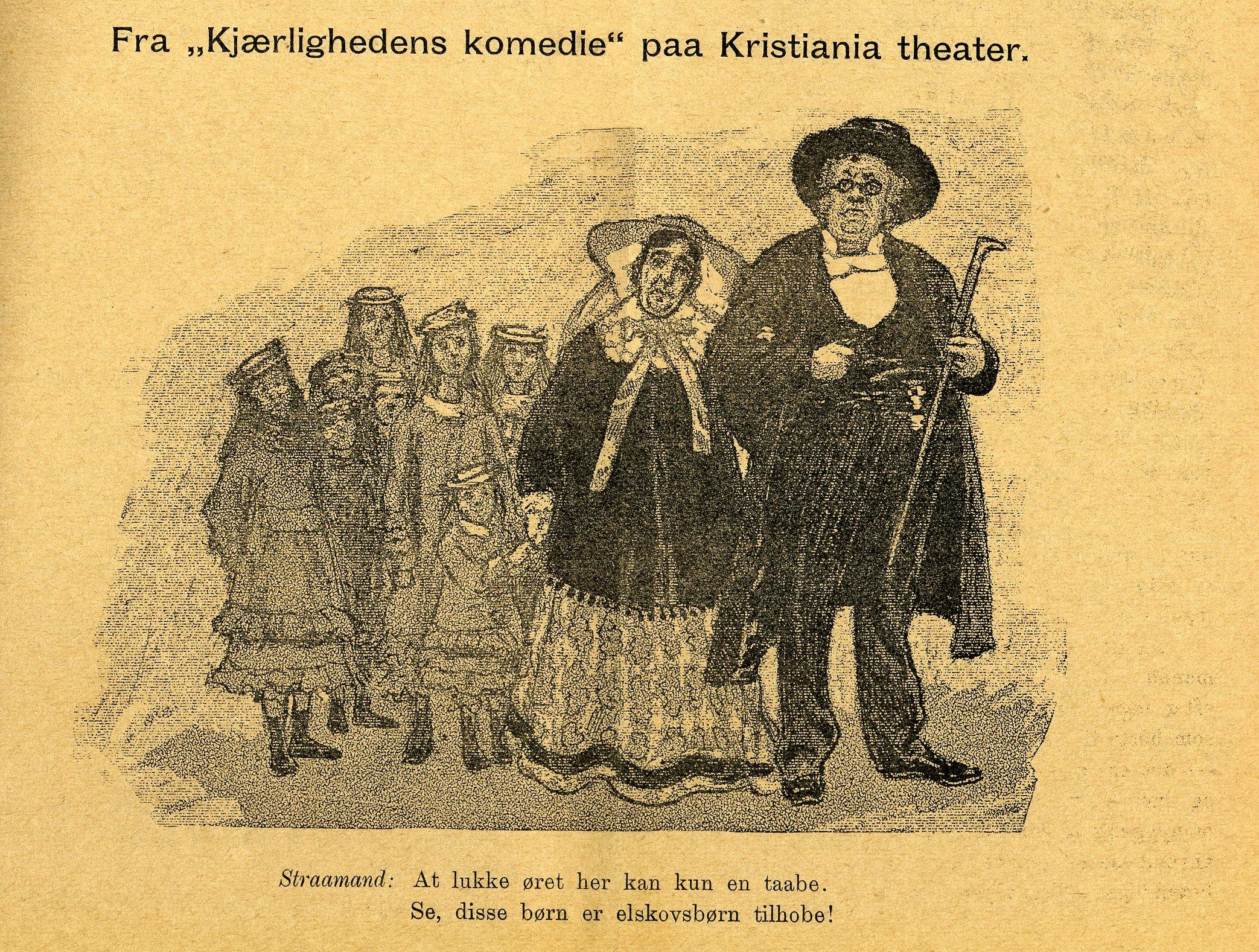
Illustration to Love's Comedy. Tyrihans No. 22. Friday 31 May 1895.

== Sources ==
- Ferguson, Robert. 1996. Henrik Ibsen, A New Biography. London: Richard Cohen.
- Johnston, Brian. 1980. To the Third Empire: Ibsen's Early Drama. Minneapolis: U of Minnesota P, 2009. ISBN 978-0-8166-5798-8.
- Meyer, Michael. 1974. Ibsen: A Biography. Abridged edition. Pelican Biographies ser. Harmondsworth: Penguin. ISBN 0-14-021772-X.
- Moi, Toril. 2006. Henrik Ibsen and the Birth of Modernism: Art, Theater, Philosophy. Oxford and New York: Oxford UP. ISBN 978-0-19-920259-1.
