= Birgitte Cornelia Rojahn =

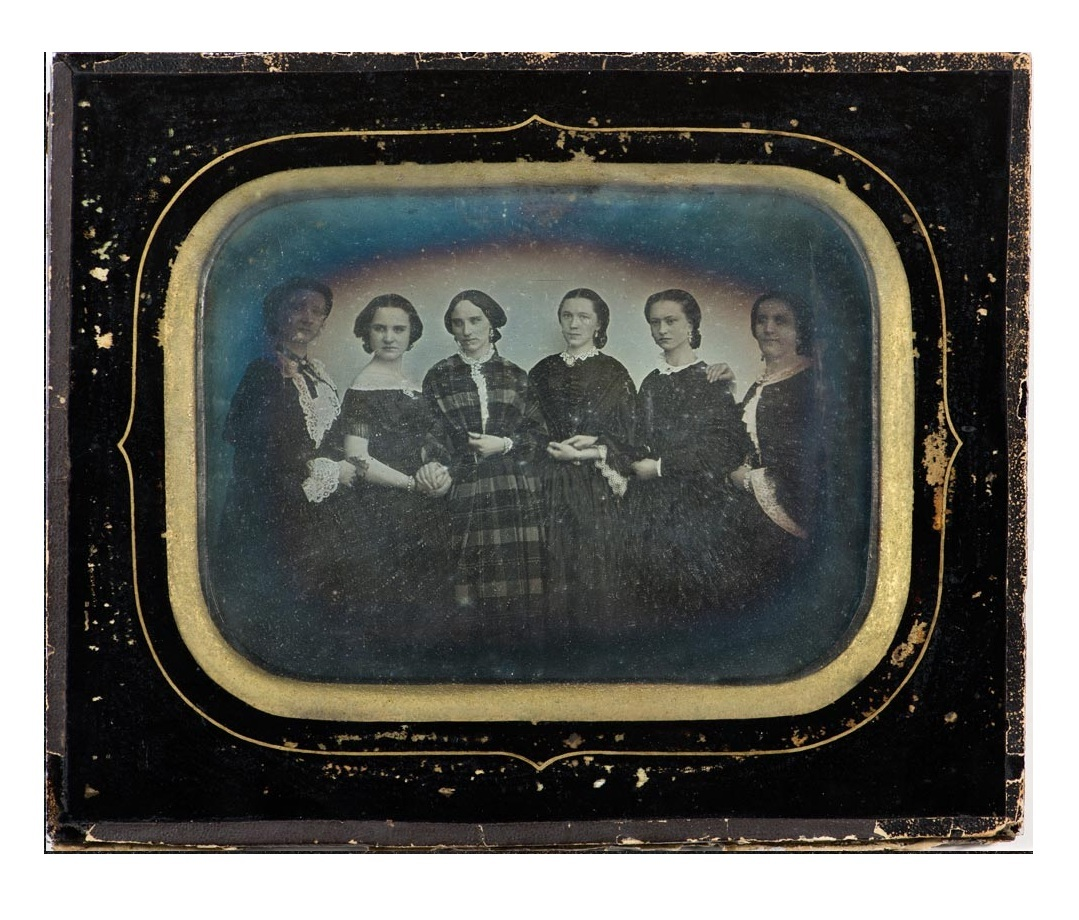
Daguerreotype of the actresses at the first Norwegian Theater, 1856. From left: Ms. Sørensen(?), Birgitte Cornelia Rojahn, Louise Brun, Janny Grip Isachsen, Fredrikke Louise Nielsen and Benedicte Hundevadt. Photo by Hans Krum. NTNU University Library.

Birgitte Cornelia Rojahn (18 February 1839 - 20 April 1927) was a Norwegian stage actress, concert singer and voice trainer.

She was the daughter of Ole Gulbrandsen Spor and wife Ingeborg Olsdatter England, and grew up at Smørsalmenningen in Bergen, where her father ran his own beer brewery. She was the sister of stage actress Louise Brun (1830–1866), wife of actor Johannes Brun (1832–1890).

Birgitte Cornelia Rojahn was engaged at the Det norske Theater (Bergen) in 1854-1857, was active as a concert singer in 1857-59, and as a singing instructor from 1859.

In 1859, she was married to Ferdinand August Rojahn, who came from Braunschweig, Germany. They were the parents of six children.

== Other sources ==
- Jensson, Liv 1981: Biografisk skuespillerleksikon. Norske, danske og svenske skuespillere på norske scener særlig på 1800-tallet. Oslo: Universitetsforlaget. ISBN 82-00-05622-8.
