= Svanhild (play) =

Incomplete 1860 play by Henrik Ibsen, inspiration for Love's Comedy

Svanhild is an 1860 incomplete prosaic comedy by Norwegian playwright Henrik Ibsen, inspired by themes of Norwegian romantic nationalism, Germanic heroic legend and Norse saga literature. The title of the play suggests that it would be centered around Svanhildr, daughter of the Norse-Germanic mythological figure Sigurd. Ibsen left the work as a draft, and as such it was never officially published in his lifetime. However, an incomplete version of the manuscript was published in 1887 by Ibsen biographer Henrik Jæger as part of an article in Folkebladet.

Ibsen revisited the text of Svanhild later, and the resulting work was the 1862 play Love's Comedy. Though a complete manuscript has never been published, a play based on the available material was produced and performed by the Theatre of Cruelty in Oslo on 14 March 2014.

== Original manuscript ==
The original manuscript, such as it is, is located at the National Library of Norway in Oslo (NBO Ms. 4° 926), and is titled Svanhild. Comedy in Three Acts (Norwegian: Svanhild. Komedie i tre Akter). The surviving text consists only of the three scenes that make up the first act. This is sufficient to illustrate the text's central motives of love inspiring poetry while marriage is the end of creativity, and its ending is self-contained if mysterious.

== Plot ==
The two main protagonists share their names with those of the 1862 drama's Svanhild and Falk. The first scene is set in a country house belonging to lady Halm, the widow of a public servant. Falk, a poet, is performing a song for those gathered in a pavilion. Later, he encounters the young Svanhild alone, who is angry with Falk after witnessing him kill a starling in the backyard the day before. Falk justifies the killing by asserting that the bird had sung its verses for him, and that this inspired poetry in him that he intends to write the same evening. Thus, he decided that the bird had no further use of its life, and that he might as well end it. Falk then hands Svanhild a copy of the Völsunga saga, jokingly proclaiming it her family chronicle as Svanhildr is a character featured in the saga. He then recalls the method of Svanhildr's execution (trampled and torn apart by horses) and declares that Svanhild must be trod on, desecrated and crushed before being of use to anyone else, framing this as a "sacrifice to the world". He then asks her if she has the "courage" to be his muse for a summer of eroticism and poetry, and to devote her sacrifice to him and his poetry instead of the world or anyone else. Crazed, he continues to accost an increasingly-frightened Svanhild, imploring her to let him "learn her by heart" before the winter season, until she finally declines his advances as the other members of their social circle notice them and draw closer.

=== Characters ===
- Lady Halm, the widow of a civil servant
- Sofie and Svanhild, her daughters
- Johan, her son, a student
- Falk, a young poet and author
- Guldstad, a merchant
- Fladland, a student
- Straamand, priest and politician
- Lady Straamand, his wife
- Pasop, an editor
- Miss Lærke, his girlfriend
- Guests and family, who are congratulating
