= Arild Haaland =

Norwegian philosopher and writer

- Born: 13 December 1919; Bergen, Norway
- Died: 24 January 2012 (aged 92); Norway
- Awards: Order of St. Olav (1979); Fritt Ord Honorary Award (1992)

Arild Peter Haaland (13 December 1919 – 24 January 2012) was a Norwegian philosopher, literary historian, translator and non-fiction writer. He was born in Bergen. His thesis from 1956 was an analysis of the Nazism in Germany. He was decorated Knight, First Class of the Order of St. Olav in 1979. He received the Fritt Ord Award in 1992. Haaland was portrayed by sculptor Arnold Haukeland, and by the painters Odd Nerdrum and Karl Erik Harr.

== Selected works ==
- Exposition and critical examination of Nietzsche's "Will to Power" philosophy. 1946. (thesis)
- Nazismen i Tyskland. En analyse av dens forutsetninger. 1955. (dr. thesis)
- Seks studier i Ibsen. 1965.
- Vekst og verdi. Avvikerlære. 1971.
- Skatt i Norge. En bok om overskudd, likestilling og medeie. 1976.
- Ibsens verden. En studie i kunst som forskning. 1978.
- Ringer i vann. Ni studier i frihet. 1989.
