= Rochan =

Rochan رچان
- Village
- Location within Iran
- Coordinates: 28°39′42″N 56°19′27″E
- Country: Iran
- Province: Kerman
- County: Baft
- Bakhsh: Central
- Rural District: Khabar

Population (2006)
  - Total: 73
- Time zone: UTC+3:30 (IRST)
  - Summer (DST): UTC+4:30 (IRDT)

Rochan (Persian: رچان, also Romanized as Rochān; also known as Rojān, Roochoon Olya, Roochoon Sofla, Rūjūn, and Rūtshūn) is a village in Khabar Rural District, in the Central District of Baft County, Kerman Province, Iran. At the 2006 census, its population was 73, in 29 families.
