= Ferdinand A. Rojahn =

German musician

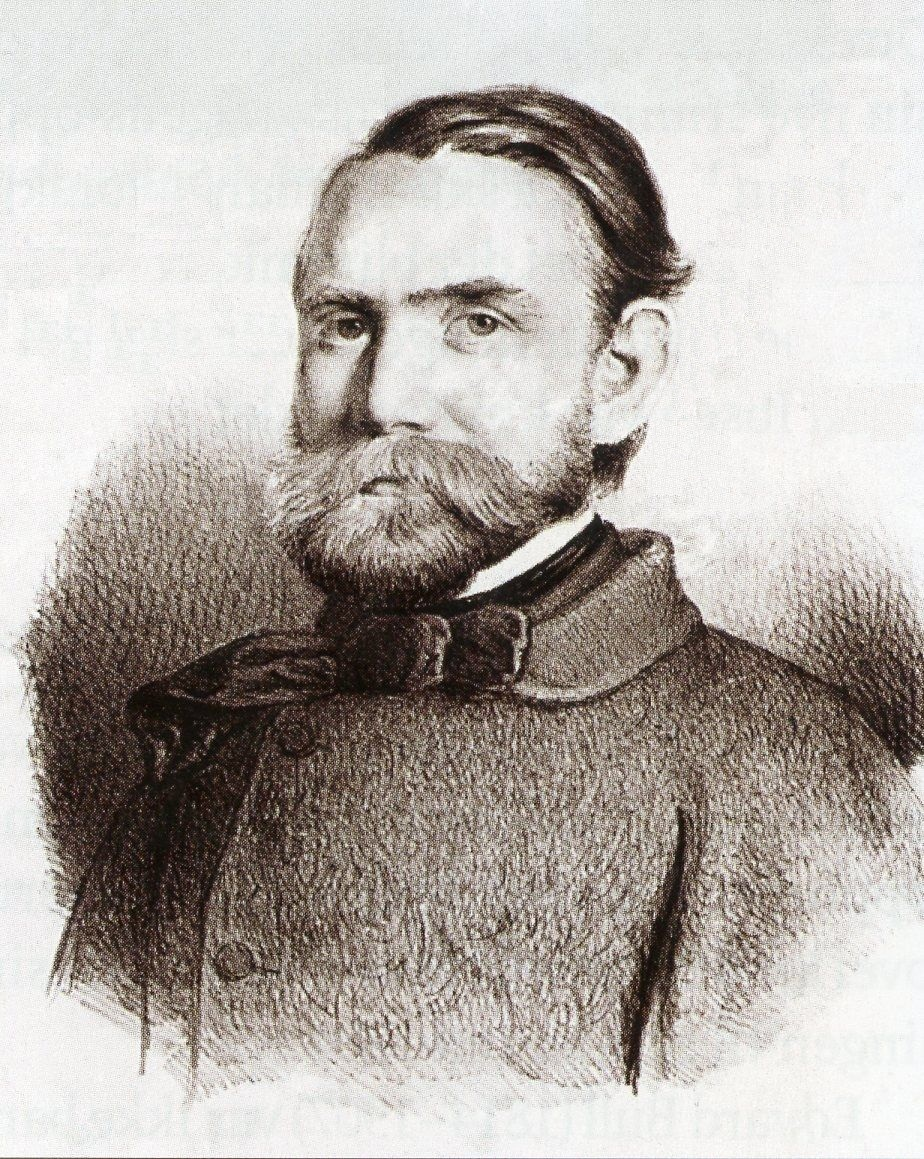

Ferdinand August Rojahn (1822-1900) was a German-born organist, violinist and conductor.

== Life and career ==
The son of Johan Friedrich Gottlieb Rojahn and Dorothea Schunnemann Rojahn, Ferdinand August Rojahn was born in Bad Gandersheim, Germany in 1822. He was educated as a musician in the cities of Hildesheim and Hamburg. In the latter city he was a pupil of Carl Schwencke, the son of Christian Friedrich Gottlieb Schwencke.

In 1841 Rojahn joined the Harz-Verein, a German orchestra which traveled to Norway and performed more than 340 concerts on tour in that nation in 1840-1841. That orchestra settled into residency at the Christiania Theatre where Rojahn was employed as a conductor of operas. In addition to conducting he also played in the orchestra at that theatre from 1841-1845.

Rojahn was employed by the city of Fredrikstad as a town musician from 1845-1853. He was a violin and piano teacher to the Norwegian composer, violinist and conductor Sigurd Lie (born 1871). He taught Lie while serving as organist at the Kristiansand Cathedral; a post he held in 1853-1854. He was principal conductor of Musikselskabet Harmonien (which later became the Bergen Philharmonic Orchestra) from 1856 until 1859.

In 1859 Rojahn married to Birgitte Cornelia Gulbrandsen (1839-1927). They had 8 children; two of which became professional musicians. He died in 1900.
