= Andreas Isachsen =

Norwegian actor and playwright

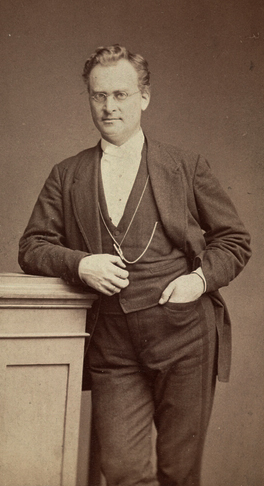
Andreas Isachsen, 1870

Andreas Hornbeck Isachsen (31 May 1829, Grimstad - February 22, 1903, Cologne) was a Norwegian actor and playwright.

== Life ==
In 1850, still a student, Isachsen briefly edited the student-society newspaper Samfundsbladet alongside the future playwright Henrik Ibsen. On 18 January 1852 he made his debut as an actor at Det norske Theater in Bergen as Ruy Gomez in the one act play Man kan hvad man vil (One can what one wants). He was employed in Bergen until 1858, when he left the stage for a time. On 10 November 1853, in Bergen, he married the actress Janny Grip (1835-1894).

He resumed acting in 1860 at the Christiania Norwegian Theatre, then under Ibsen's artistic direction. He remained in that company until the theatre went bankrupt in 1862, on which he moved to the theatre in Trondheim. In 1865 he returned to the Christiania Theatre, but joined Bjørnstjerne Bjørnson's walkout to the Folketheater at Møllergaten, where he acted from September 1870 to February 1872. From 1872 until his retirement from the stage in 1894, Isachsen remained at the Christiania Theatre.

Isachsen was known as a character actor with a particular talent for comedic roles. Isachsen argued with Ibsen over an 1873 play reading of Emperor and Galilean held at Christiania on his own initiative. He had previously held readings of lyric poems by Peter Christen Asbjørnsen and Moe, receiving praise for them from Asbjørnsen himself. Relations between Isachsen and Ibsen remained soured for the rest of Isachsen's career - Ibsen wrote a letter to the theatre's management specifically demanding that "the terrible Isachsen" would not be given any parts, since Ibsen felt he had a tendency towards over-acting and caricaturing roles.

== Bibliography ==
- Skuespiller Isachsen (s. 86-87). Folkebladet No. 6. Søndag 15de Marts 1903.
