= Lucie Wolf =

Norwegian actress (1833–1902)

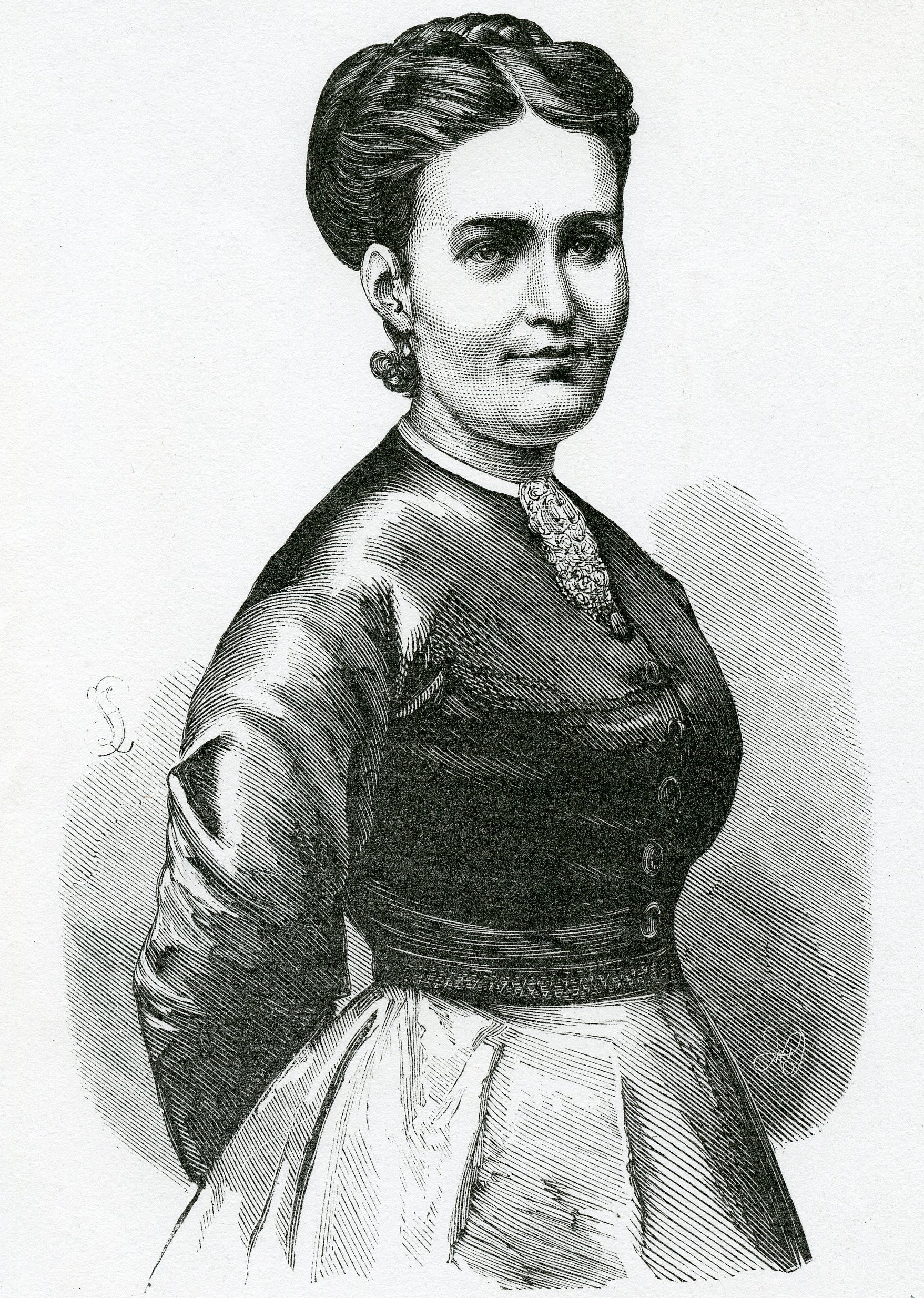
- Born: 25 May 1833; Bergen, Norway
- Died: 6 October 1902 (aged 69)
- Occupation: Actress

Lucie Wolf (née Johannesen; 25 May 1833 – 6 October 1902) was a Norwegian stage actress.

== Biography ==
Born in Bergen, Wolf was the daughter of Svend Johannesen (1796–1882) and Johanne Andrea Jonsdotter (1799–1862).

She made her stage debut in 1850 at Ole Bull's Det norske Theater in Bergen. From 1853 she played at Christiania Theatre and from 1901 at Nationaltheatret. She had her last stage performance in 1902.

She wrote about her experiences on the early Norwegian theater in Skuespillerinden Fru Lucie Wolfs Livserindringer (1897). She was married in 1854 to the Danish actor and opera singer Jacob Wilhelm Nicolay Wolf (1824–1875).Their daughter Sigrid Wolf-Schøller (1863-1927) became a opera singer (mezzo-soprano) and music educator.
