= Clara Ursin =

Norwegian-Danish actress and opera singer

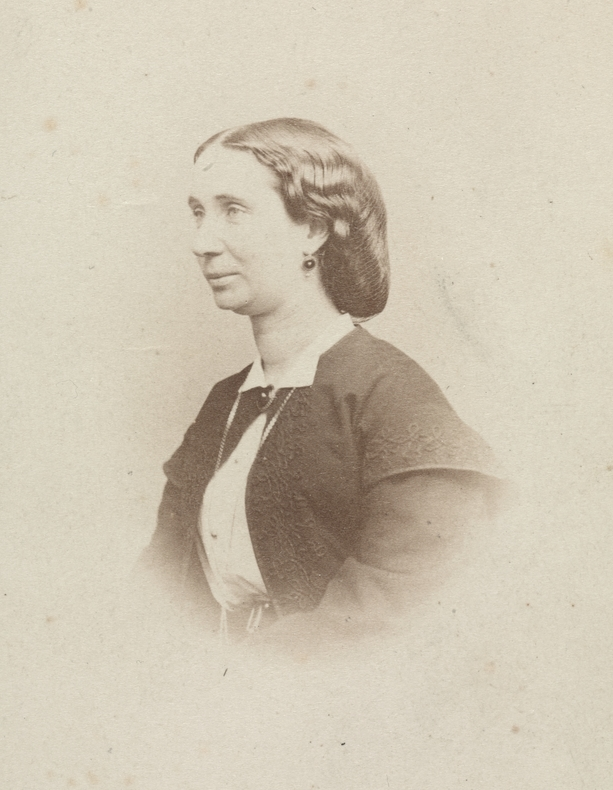
- Ursin, circa 1865
- Occupations: Actress and singer
- Spouse: Fredrik Ursin

Clara Ursin was a Norwegian-Danish stage actress and opera singer.

== Biography ==
In 1828, she was admitted to the music conservatory in Copenhagen. She debuted in 1947 at the Royal Danish Theatre in Copenhagen. She was active at the Christiania Theatre in Oslo from 1849-1876. She was married to Fredrik Ursin (c. 1825-1890), violinist in the Christiania Theatre orchestra.

Ursin was regarded as the best female writer of the Norwegian theatre for many years and one of the reasons that the Christiania Theatre (long the only theatre in Norway) was occasionally able to offer opera performances. She ended her stage career after the 1875-76 season.

It was said of Ursin that she:

"... did not obtain any high rank as an actress, but was for many years the best female singer of the theatre and performed significant lyric roles within opera as well as operetta."
