= Christiania Norwegian Theatre =

Former theatre in Norway

The Christiania Norwegian Theatre (Norwegian: Kristiania norske Theater) was founded in 1852 under the name Norwegian Dramatic School. The initiative came from lieutenant engineer Johannes Benedictus Klingenberg (1817–1882) after he had been disappointed by the un-Norwegian repertoire selection and had visited the Norwegian Theatre in Bergen. In 1854, the drama school was made into a performing arts theater.

Henrik Ibsen, then associated with the Norwegian Theatre in Bergen, where he was stage director, was called in to become the first artistic director of the Christiania Norwegian Theater. Ibsen took over the responsibility for the new theater operations from autumn 1857, serving as theater director until it went bankrupt, in the summer of 1862. The Christian Norwegian Theatre and the Christiania Theatre were officially merged on 15 July 1863.

== Literature ==
- Anker, Øyvinnd: Kristiania norske Theater's repertoire 1852–1863. Gyldendal. Oslo 1956.
- Lund, Audhild: Henrik Ibsen og Det norske teater 1857–1863. Oslo 1925.
