= Johannes Brun =

Norwegian actor

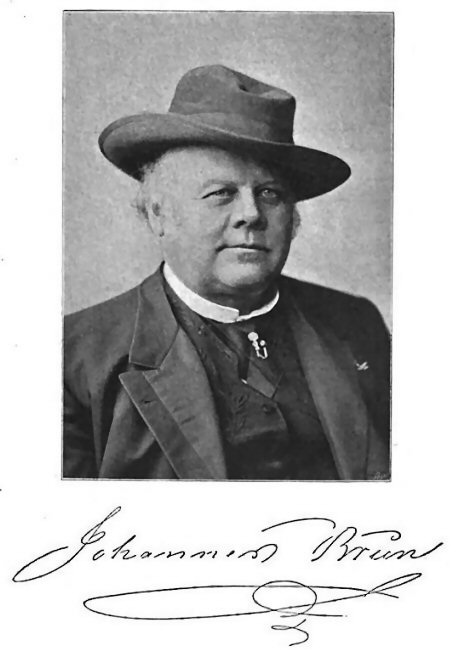
Johannes Brun: a Description of his Life and his Contemporaries (1899)

Johannes Finne Brun (10 March 1832 – 7 March 1890) was a Norwegian stage actor.

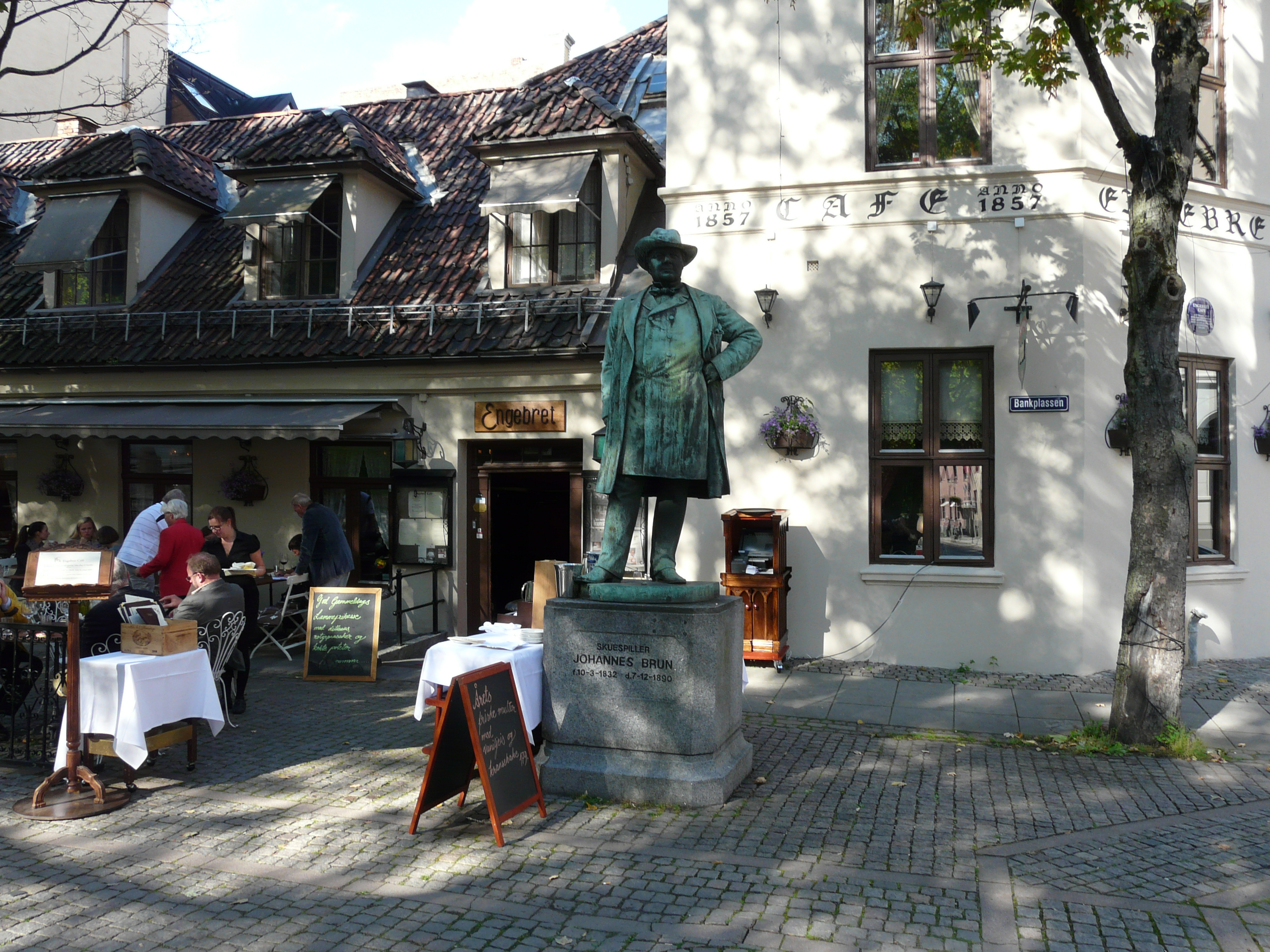
Statue of Johannes Brun at Cafe Engebret, which was built in 1857. Oslo, 2012 year.

Brun was born in Verdal. He made his stage debut as the character "Henrik" in Holberg's comedy Den Vægelsindede on 2 January 1850, at the first ordinary performance at Ole Bull's Det norske Theater in Bergen. He was married to actress Louise Brun (née Gulbrandsen) in 1851. From 1857 both Brun and his wife played at Christiania Theatre.

Brun is regarded among the most important Norwegian actors of his time.

== Bibliography ==
- Almquist, Olaf (1898). Johannes Brun. En skildring af hans liv og hans samtidige (in Norwegian). Kristiania: Alb. Cammermeyers Forlag.
