= Louise Brun =

Norwegian actress

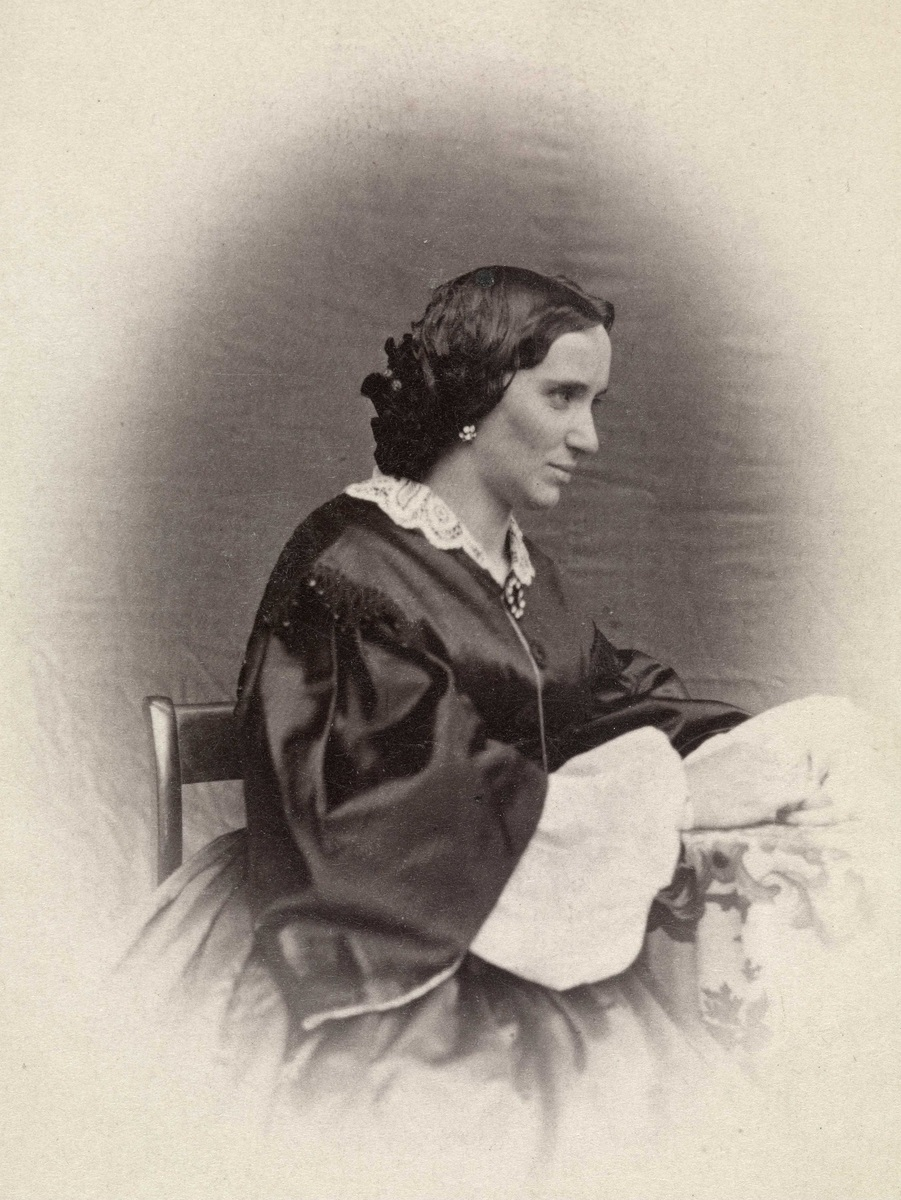
Louise Brun ca. 1860

Louise Larsine Brun née Gulbrandsen (16 December 1830 – 21 January 1866), was a Norwegian actress. She is counted among the most famed and most noted actors in Norway in the 19th century.

== Biography ==
She was the daughter of Ole Gulbrandsen Spor and wife Ingeborg Olsdatter England, and grew up at Smørsalmenningen in Bergen, Norway where her father ran his own beer brewery. She was the elder sister of stage actress and concert singer Birgitte Cornelia Rojahn (1839-1927).

Louise Brun debuted on the stage at the Det norske Theater in Bergen. At the opening performance on January 2, 1850, she was selected to play the role of Lucretia in the three-act comedy Den vægelsindede by Ludvig Holberg.

In 1851, she married her colleague Johannes Brun (1832–1890), also one of the most noted Norwegian actors of his time. Together with her husband in 1852 she went on a study trip to Copenhagen.

In 1857, the couple moved to Oslo, where she was active the remaining years of her career. She was considered to be artistic and with an intelligent apprehension ability. She played both tragedy and comedy, but was most known within the so-called salon-comedies, a popular genre of the period.

== Other sources ==
- Brun, 2. Louise i Nordisk familjebok (andra upplagan, 1905)
