= Det norske Theater (Bergen) =

Theatre in Bergen, Norway

Coordinates: 60.393°N 5.320°E

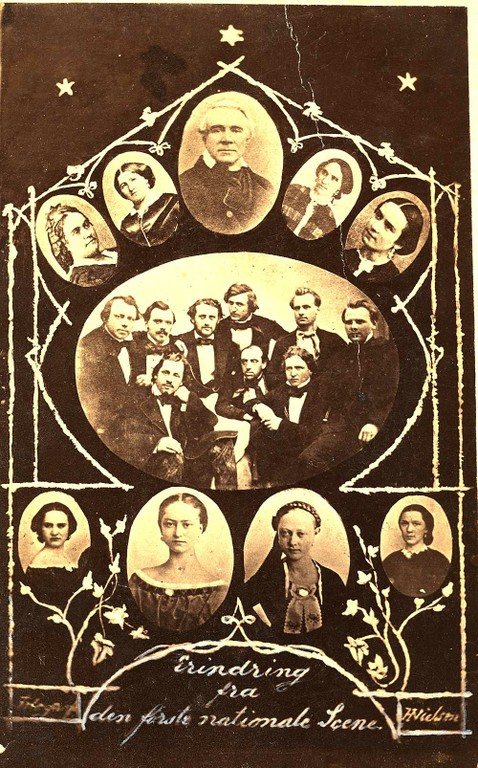
The first staff by Ole Bull's The Norwegian Theater in Bergen, with Johannes Brun, Louise Brun, Andreas Isachsen, Fredrikke Nielsen, Lucy Wolf, Jacob Prom among others

Det norske Theater is a former theatre in Bergen, Norway, and regarded as the first pure Norwegian stage theatre. It opened in 1850 (176 years ago) by primus motor, violinist Ole Bull, and closed in 1863 (163 years ago), after a bankruptcy. The theatre's first production was Holberg's comedy Den Vægelsindede, and the opening was on 2 January 1850. The theatre played at the old comedy house built in 1800.

In 1876 the theatre Den Nationale Scene opened in the same building.
