= Christiane Bøcher =

Norwegian actress

- Born: Christiane Magdalene Jane Bøcher; 26 March 1798; Copenhagen
- Died: 25 October 1874 (aged 76); Copenhagen
- Other names: Christiane Hansen; Christiane Berg
- Spouses: Jens Lang Bøcher; Jean Louis Napoleon Berg

Christiane Magdalene Jane Bøcher, née Hansen, later Berg (Copenhagen, 26 March 1798 – Copenhagen, 25 October 1874), was a Norwegian (originally Danish) stage actress. She belonged to the pioneer generation of the first public theatre in Norway, when the Christiania Offentlige Theater was the only standing stage in Norway, and dominated by actors of Danish origin.

== Life ==
Christiane Bøcher was born in Copenhagen as the daughter of the accountant Peder Jacob Hansen and Juliane Sørensen. She married the actor Jens Lang Bøcher (1799-1833), director of the Christiania Theatre in 1828-31, and secondly to the Danish singer Jean Louis Napoleon Berg.

=== Career ===
Christiane Bøcher was engaged at the Strömberg Theatre (later known as the Christiania Offentlige Theater) in Christiania (now Oslo) from 1827 to 1837. Founded by Johan Peter Strömberg (1773–1834) the previous year, the theatre was Norway's first and (at that time only) theatre and the national stage in the 19th century. Until the employment of Laura Gundersen in 1849, however, the theatre employed almost exclusively actors from Denmark and Germany, in large because Norway did not yet have an established theatre school and trained actors.

Strömberg had the ambition to create Norwegian actors, but upon the foundation of the first theatre in Norway there was not trained Norwegian actors, which made it necessary to employ Danish actors. Among the first mentioned were Christiane Hansen and Jens Lang Bøcher, both hired in 1827 and described as greatly talented students.

During the 1830s, she was described as the leading lady of the stage and popular among both the public and the critics and compared to the famous Mademoiselle Mars in Paris. She was described as considerable talent as well as a sympathetic personality, and particularly praised for her good taste in regard to her costume. The theatre critic signature "R." remarked that as he could not find enough praise for her and was afraid to boor his readers by trying, he customarily gave her the critic "Madame Bøcher acted as usual"- that is to say "excellent in all aspects". After her performance as Susanna in the Marriage of Figaro, a viewer commented in Christianias Aftenblad that:

"he had not seen any one above her, hardly any one alongside her. Correct declamation, loveable naivety, some affected coquetry to hid the finest virtue, a tasteful costume [...] united in the creation of a skillful actress in full grandeur."

However, she was not given all praise - while considered terrific in comedy, she was not regarded to be of much use in tragedy or as a singer (for that Augusta Schrumpf (1813–1900) was her parallel in the theatre). Among her parts where Luise Miller in Kabale og Kjærlighed Maria in Correggio and Valborg in Axel og Valbor.

She retired from the stage in 1837 and left Norway for Denmark with her spouse in July of that year.

== Other sources ==
- Blanc, Tharald Høyerup: Christiania theaters historie 1827-1877, J.W. Cappelen Christiania
- Liv Jensson, Teater i Drammen inntil 1840, Gyldendal, 1974
