= 1814 =

1814 in various calendars
- Gregorian calendar: 1814; MDCCCXIV
- Ab urbe condita: 2567
- Armenian calendar: 1263; ԹՎ ՌՄԿԳ
- Assyrian calendar: 6564
- Balinese saka calendar: 1735–1736
- Bengali calendar: 1220–1221
- Berber calendar: 2764
- British Regnal year: 54 Geo. 3 – 55 Geo. 3
- Buddhist calendar: 2358
- Burmese calendar: 1176
- Byzantine calendar: 7322–7323
- Chinese calendar: 癸酉年 (Water Rooster); 4511 or 4304 — to — 甲戌年 (Wood Dog); 4512 or 4305
- Coptic calendar: 1530–1531
- Discordian calendar: 2980
- Ethiopian calendar: 1806–1807
- Hebrew calendar: 5574–5575
- Hindu calendars
- Vikram Samvat: 1870–1871
- Shaka Samvat: 1735–1736
- Kali Yuga: 4914–4915
- Holocene calendar: 11814
- Igbo calendar: 814–815
- Iranian calendar: 1192–1193
- Islamic calendar: 1229–1230
- Japanese calendar: Bunka 11 (文化１１年)
- Javanese calendar: 1740–1741
- Julian calendar: Gregorian minus 12 days
- Korean calendar: 4147
- Minguo calendar: 98 before ROC 民前98年
- Nanakshahi calendar: 346
- Thai solar calendar: 2356–2357
- Tibetan calendar: ཆུ་མོ་བྱ་ལོ་ (female Water-Bird); 1940 or 1559 or 787 — to — ཤིང་ཕོ་ཁྱི་ལོ་ (male Wood-Dog); 1941 or 1560 or 788

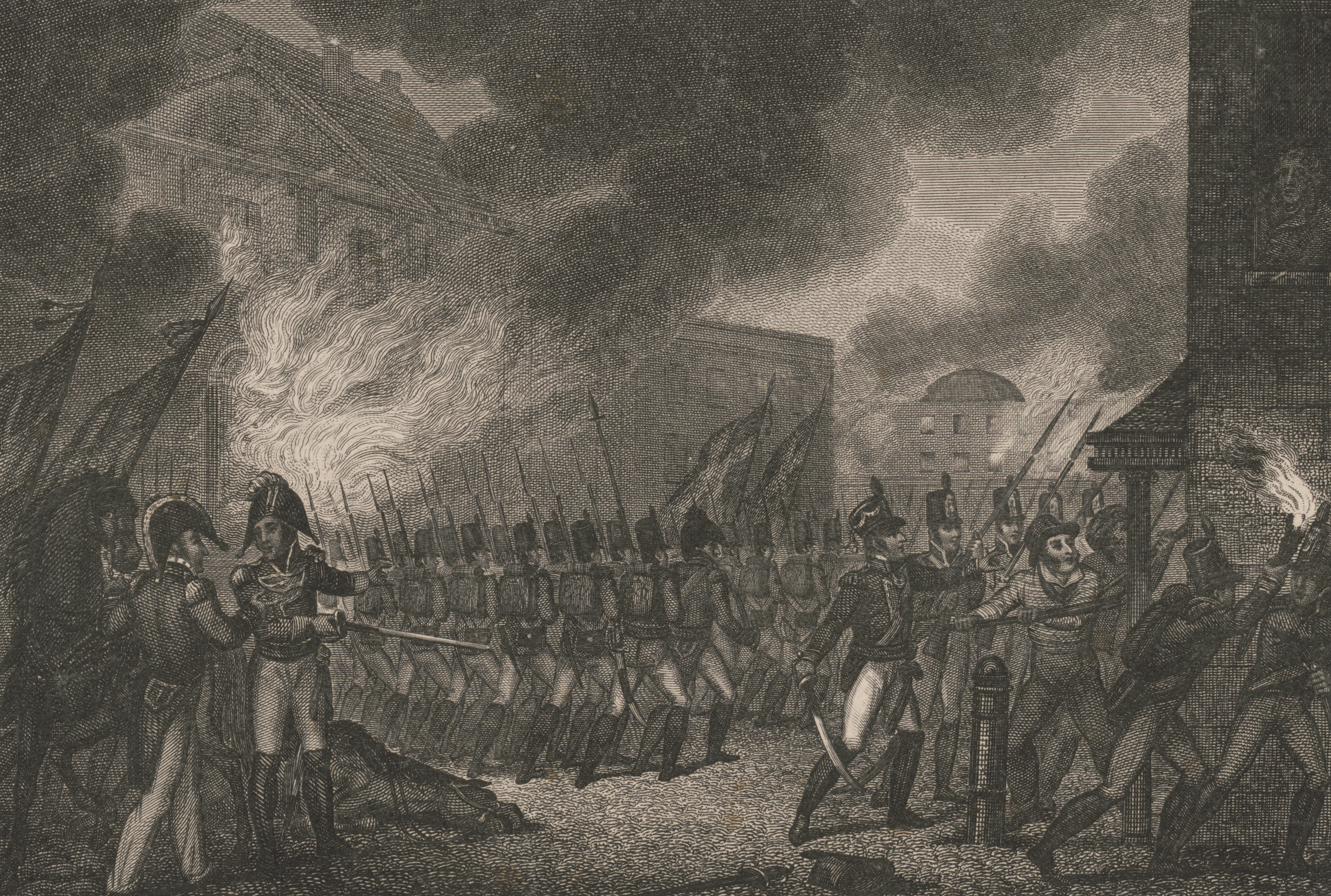
August 24: British troops capture Washington D.C., capital of the United States, and burn the U.S. Capitol and the White House after President Madison and members of Congress flee.

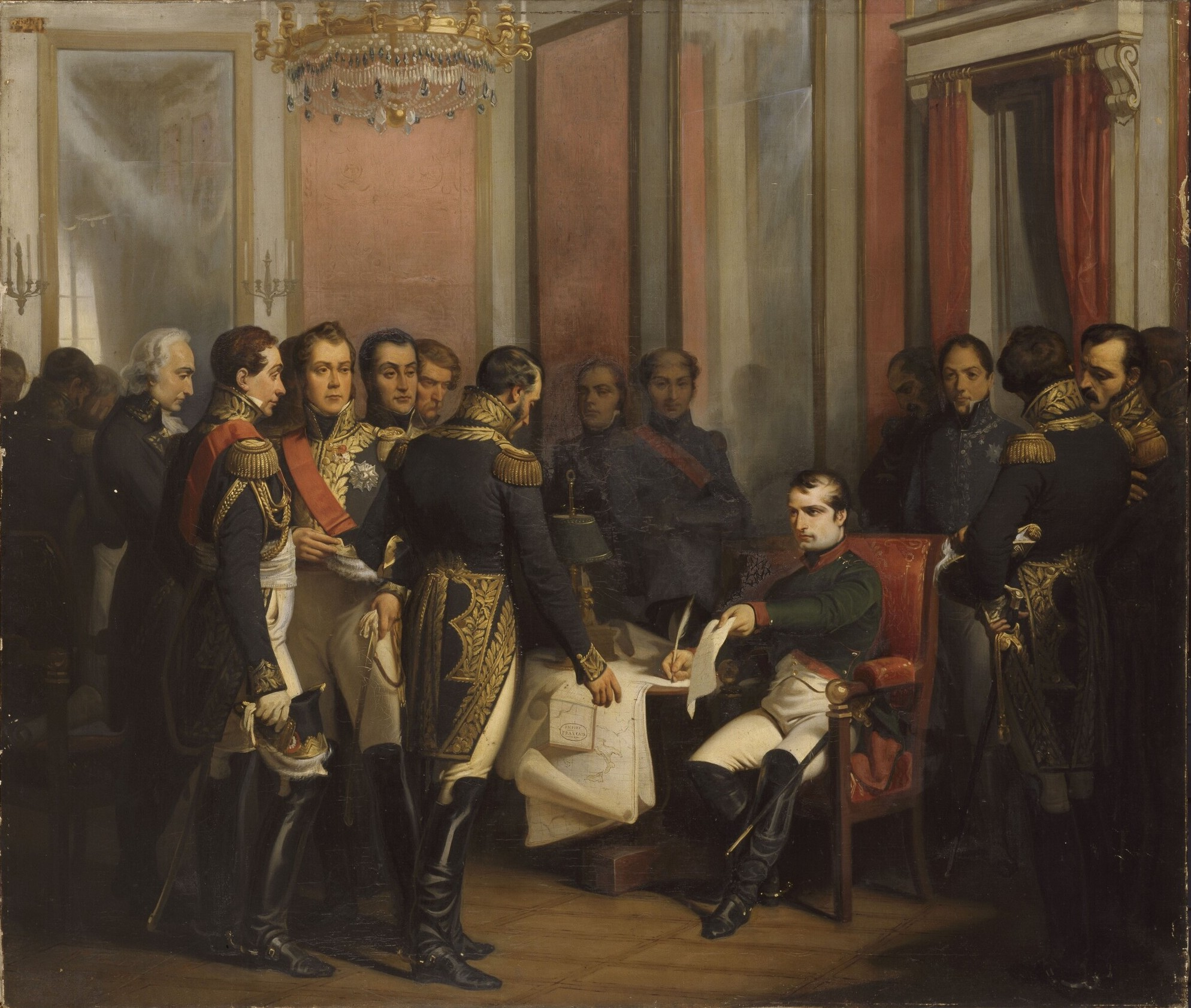
April 11: France's Emperor Napoleon, conqueror of much of Europe, abdicates by signing the Treaty of Fontainebleau (1814).

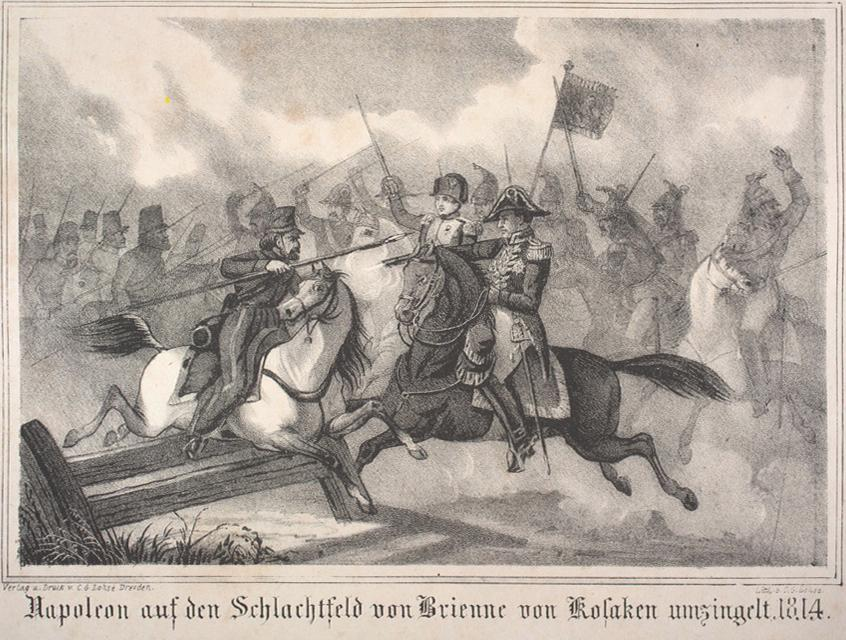
January 29: Battle of Brienne

1814 (MDCCCXIV) was a common year starting on Saturday of the Gregorian calendar and a common year starting on Thursday of the Julian calendar, the 1814th year of the Common Era (CE) and Anno Domini (AD) designations, the 814th year of the 2nd millennium, the 14th year of the 19th century, and the 5th year of the 1810s decade. As of the start of 1814, the Gregorian calendar was 12 days ahead of the Julian calendar, which remained in localized use until 1923.

== Events ==
=== January ===
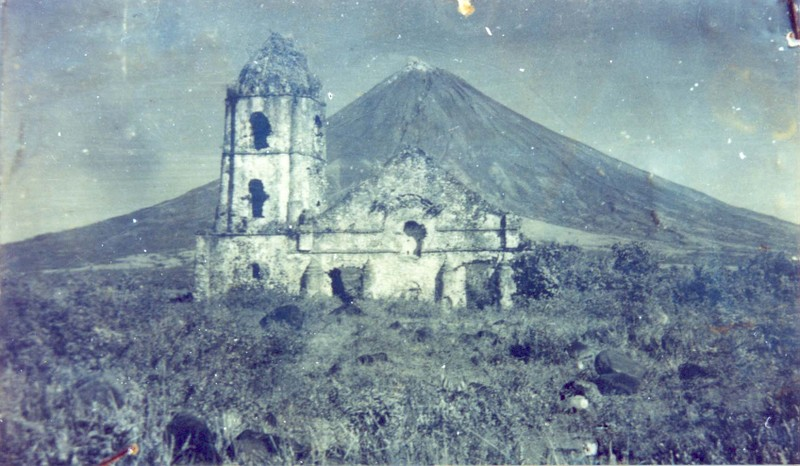
February 1: Cagsawa Church is destroyed by eruption of Mount Mayon.

- January 1 – War of the Sixth Coalition – The Royal Prussian Army led by Gebhard Leberecht von Blücher crosses the Rhine.
- January 3
  - War of the Sixth Coalition – Siege of Cattaro: French garrison surrenders to the British after ten days of bombardment.
  - War of the Sixth Coalition – Siege of Metz: Allied armies lay siege to the French city and fortress of Metz.
- January 5 – Mexican War of Independence – Battle of Puruarán: Spanish Royalists defeat Mexican Rebels.
- January 11 – War of the Sixth Coalition – Battle of Hoogstraten: Prussian forces under Friedrich Wilhelm Freiherr von Bülow defeat the French.
- January 14
  - Treaty of Kiel: Frederick VI of Denmark cedes the Kingdom of Norway into personal union with Sweden, in exchange for west Pomerania. This marks the end of the real union of Denmark-Norway.
  - War of the Sixth Coalition – Siege of Antwerp: Allied forces besiege French Antwerp.
- January 19 – War of the Sixth Coalition – Siege of Ragusa: Allied siege of French town begins.
- January 22, January 24 – War of 1812 – Battles of Emuckfaw and Enotachopo Creek: In northern Alabama, United States forces under General Andrew Jackson defeat the Red Sticks.
- January 24 – War of the Sixth Coalition – First Battle of Bar-sur-Aube: Two Austrian and Württemberger corps wage an inconclusive battle against the French Imperial Guard.
- January 27
  - War of the Sixth Coalition – Siege of Ragusa: French garrison surrenders to the British and the Austrians.
  - War of 1812 – Battle of Calebee Creek: US forces under John Floyd defeat the Red Sticks in Alabama.
- January 29 – War of the Sixth Coalition – Battle of Brienne: A French army led by Napoleon is victorious against von Blücher.
- January 31 – Gervasio Antonio de Posadas becomes Supreme Director of Argentina.

=== February ===
- February – George Hamilton-Gordon, 4th Earl of Aberdeen, represents Britain at the Congress of Chatillon.
- February 1
  - Mount Mayon in the Philippines erupts for the second time; more than 1,200 people die and the Cagsawa Church is destroyed.
  - Lord Byron's semi-autobiographical tale in verse The Corsair is published by John Murray in London, and sells 10,000 copies on this day.
  - War of the Sixth Coalition – Battle of La Rothière: Blücher's Allied army defeats the French under Napoleon.
- February 2 – War of the Sixth Coalition – Battle of Lesmont: French forces under Joseph Lagrange defeat the Allies.
- February 8 – War of the Sixth Coalition – Battle of the Mincio River: French and Italian troops under Viceroy Eugène de Beauharnais fight an Austrian army to a draw.
- February 10 – War of the Sixth Coalition – Battle of Champaubert: A French army led by Napoleon effectively destroys a small Russian corps led by Zakhar Dmitrievich Olsufiev, opening the Six Days' Campaign.
- February 11
  - Norway's independence is proclaimed, marking the ultimate end of the Kalmar Union.
  - War of the Sixth Coalition – Battle of Montmirail: A French army led by Napoleon is victorious against Fabian Gottlieb von der Osten-Sacken and Ludwig Yorck von Wartenburg in the Six Days' Campaign.
- February 12
  - A fire destroys the Custom House in the City of London.
  - War of the Sixth Coalition – Battle of Château-Thierry (1814): A French army led by Napoleon is victorious against Ludwig Yorck von Wartenburg and Fabian Gottlieb von der Osten-Sacken in the Six Days' Campaign.
  - Venezuelan War of Independence – Battle of La Victoria (1814): Republicans defeat Spanish Royalists.
- February 14 – War of the Sixth Coalition – Battle of Vauchamps: A French army led by Napoleon is victorious against von Blücher, the last major action of the Six Days' Campaign.
- February 15 – War of the Sixth Coalition – Battle of Garris: An Allied army led by the Duke of Wellington is victorious against the French under Jean Isidore Harispe.
- February 17 – War of the Sixth Coalition – Battle of Mormant: A French army led by Napoleon effectively destroys a Russian division.
- February 18 – War of the Sixth Coalition – Battle of Montereau: A French army led by Napoleon is victorious against Austrian forces.
- February 21 – The Great Stock Exchange Fraud is exposed in London.
- February 27
  - War of the Sixth Coalition – Battle of Bar-sur-Aube: An Allied army led by the Prince of Schwarzenberg is victorious against the French under Jacques MacDonald.
  - War of the Sixth Coalition – Battle of Orthez: An Allied army led by the Duke of Wellington is victorious against the French under Jean-de-Dieu Soult.
- February 28 – War of the Sixth Coalition – Battle of Gué-à-Tresmes: Two French corps led by Auguste Marmont and Édouard Mortier defeat Prusso-Russian forces.

=== March ===
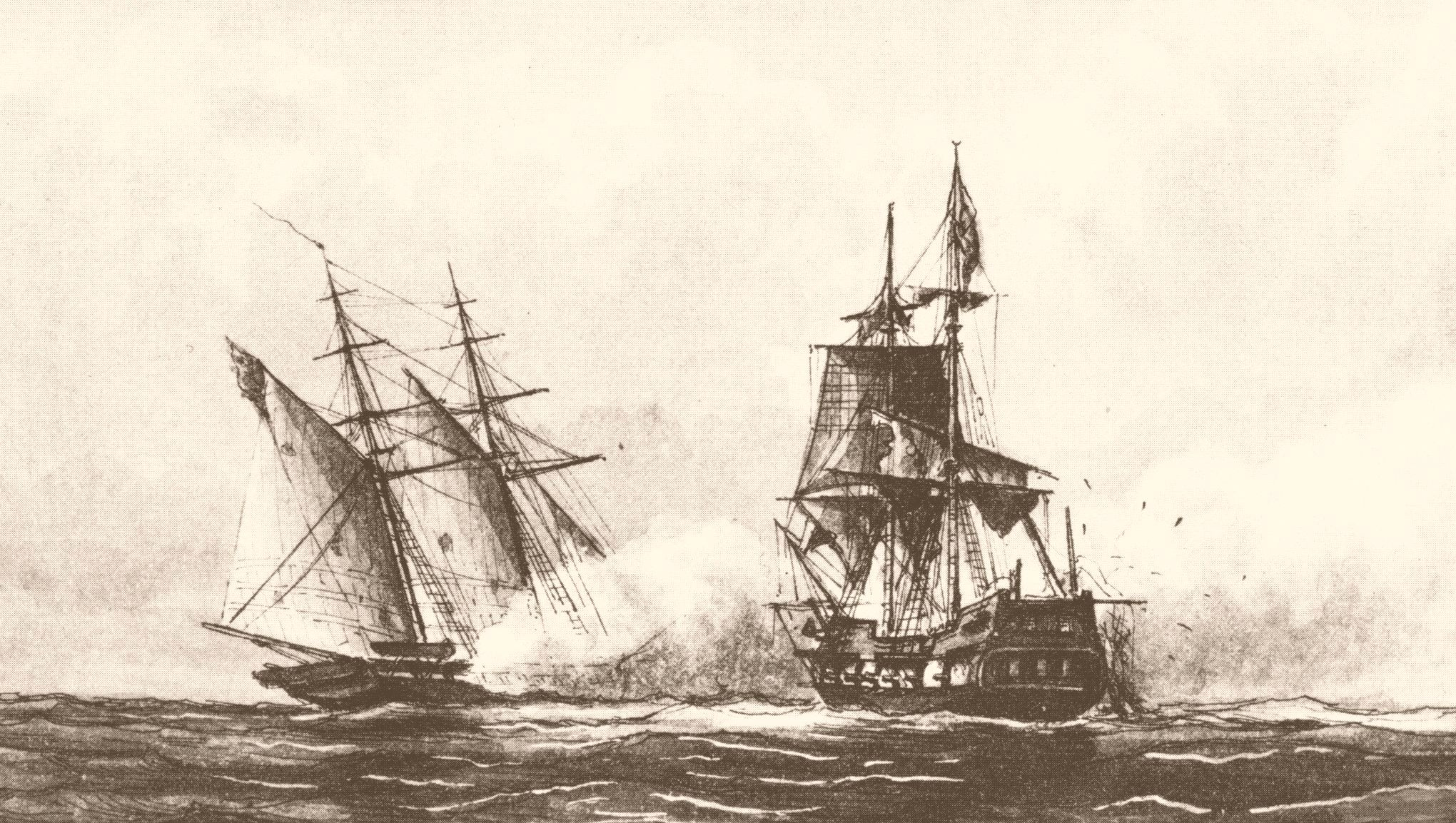
March 9: The schooner Enterprise returns from the Caribbean.

- March 1 – War of the Sixth Coalition – Battle of Saint-Julien: Austrian Army of the South defeats the French Army of the Rhône.
- March 3
  - War of the Sixth Coalition – Battle of Laubressel: Schwarzenberg defeats the French under MacDonald.
  - Chilean War of Independence – First Battle of Talca: Royalists defeat Chilean rebels.
- March 4 – War of 1812 – Battle of Longwoods: American raiding party defeats British regulars and militia and Indian fighters.
- March 5 – War of the Sixth Coalition – Battle of Berry-au-Bac: French cavalrymen led by Napoleon defeat Cossacks under Ferdinand von Wintzingerode.
- March 7 – War of the Sixth Coalition – Battle of Craonne: A French army led by Napoleon is victorious against combined Prussian and Russian forces under von Blücher and Vorontsov, but with French losses exceeding their opponents.
- March 8 – War of the Sixth Coalition: A night attack by the British under Sir Thomas Graham on the French fortress of Bergen op Zoom ends in failure.
- March 9
  - War of the Sixth Coalition – Treaty of Chaumont signed by four Allied powers, deepening their alliance against France.
  - American naval schooner USS Enterprise reaches Wilmington, North Carolina, returning from participating in the War of 1812 against the United Kingdom in the Caribbean.
- March 10 – War of the Sixth Coalition – Battle of Laon: von Blücher defeats Napoleon.
- March 10–15 – Argentine War of Independence – Battle of Martín García: The United Provinces of South America defeat the Spanish royalists.
- March 11 – War of the Sixth Coalition – Battle of Mâcon: Austrian Army of the South defeats the French Army of the Rhône.
- March 12 – Louis Antoine, Duke of Angoulême enters Bordeaux.
- March 13 – War of the Sixth Coalition – Battle of Reims: Napoleon defeats a combined Russo-Prussian corps.
- March 19 – Chilean War of Independence – Battle of El Quilo: Chilean rebels defeat Spanish royalists.
- March 20
  - War of the Sixth Coalition – Battle of Limonest: Austrian and Hessian forces defeat the French Army of the Rhône.
  - Chilean War of Independence – Battle of Membrillar: Chilean rebels defeat Spanish royalists.
- March 21 – War of the Sixth Coalition – Battle of Arcis-sur-Aube: Allied army defeats Napoleon.
- March 25
  - War of the Sixth Coalition – Battle of Fère-Champenoise: Allied army led by Schwarzenberg defeats the French under Marmont and Mortier.
  - De Nederlandsche Bank is established.
- March 26 – War of the Sixth Coalition – Battle of Saint-Dizier: Napoleon defeats the Russians under Ferdinand von Wintzingerode.
- March 26–27 – War of the Sixth Coalition – Battle of Jobourg: British squadron defeats and captures two French frigates.
- March 27 – War of 1812 – Battle of Horseshoe Bend: In northern Alabama, United States forces under General Andrew Jackson defeat the Creek Indians.
- March 28 – War of 1812 – Battle of Valparaíso: Two British Royal Navy ships easily defeat and capture USS Essex and a sister ship off the coast of Chile.
- March 29 – Chilean War of Independence – First Battle of Cancha Rayada: Spanish royalists defeat Chilean rebels.
- March 30
  - War of the Sixth Coalition: The Battle of Paris begins.
  - War of 1812 – Battle of Lacolle Mills: British garrison defeats American attack.
- March 31
  - War of the Sixth Coalition: Coalition troops occupy Paris.
  - War of the Sixth Coalition – Battle of Courtrai: French forces defeat Saxons and Prussians.

=== April–June ===
- April 6 – Napoleonic Wars – Bourbon Restoration: Louis XVIII is invited to occupy the restored French throne.
- April 10
  - Napoleonic Wars – Battle of Toulouse: The Duke of Wellington is victorious.
  - War of the Sixth Coalition – Siege of Metz is lifted by the Allies.
- April 11 – Napoleonic Wars – Treaty of Fontainebleau: The War of the Sixth Coalition ends, and Napoleon is forced to abdicate unconditionally as Emperor of the French.
- April 12
  - The Count of Artois arrives in Paris, acting as Lieutenant General of the realm before the arrival of his brother, Louis XVIII.
  - The Royal Norwegian Navy is re-established.
- April 14 – Napoleonic Wars – Battle of Bayonne: The Allies defeat a French sortie from Bayonne.
- April 18/19 – Genoa surrenders to the British Royal Navy.
- April 24 – Convention of Mantua: The Napoleonic Kingdom of Italy is returned to provisional Austrian rule.
- April 28
  - The Ligurian Republic is revived.
  - War of 1812 – Capture of HMS Epervier by the USS Peacock.
- May 2 – Napoleonic Wars – Declaration of Saint-Ouen: Louis XVIII declares his support for representative government while claiming unlimited monarchical sovereignty.
- May 3
  - The Duke of Provence, the future Louis XVIII, returns to Paris.
  - Treaty of Lircay signed between Royalists and Patriots during the Chilean War of Independence.
- May 4
  - Ferdinand VII abolishes the Spanish Constitution of 1812, returning Spain to absolute monarchy.
  - War of the Sixth Coalition – Siege of Antwerp ends in a French capitulation.
  - War of the Sixth Coalition – Siege of Mainz ends as the French leave the fortress.
- May 6 – War of 1812 – Battle of Fort Oswego: British forces attack Fort Ontario at Oswego, New York.
- May 14–16 – War of 1812 – American Raid on Port Dover and destruction of property.
- May 16 – William Brown, Irish-born rebel leader and future Admiral of the Navy of Argentina, begins a blockade of Montevideo, the colonial capital of Rio de la Plata.
- May 17
  - The Constitution of Norway is signed and the Danish Crown Prince Christian Frederik is elected King of Norway, by the Norwegian Constituent Assembly.
  - The occupation of Monaco changes from French to Austrian hands.
  - Argentine War of Independence – Battle of Buceo ends in the burning of five Spanish ships and capture of two.
- May 24 – Duke of Wellington arrives in Madrid from Paris in an attempt to avert civil war between supporters of Ferdinand VII and the opposition Liberals, including many troops who fought under him during the Peninsular War
- May 27 – War of the Sixth Coalition – Siege of Hamburg ends in a French capitulation.
- May 28
  - War of the Sixth Coalition – Barcelona is restored to Spanish Bourbon rule as the French garrison leaves the city.
  - Venezuelan War of Independence – Battle of Carabobo: Republican victory under Simón Bolívar over Spanish Royalists.
- May 29–30 – War of 1812 – Battle of Big Sandy Creek: US forces capture British marines and sailors.
- May 30 – Napoleonic Wars: The First Treaty of Paris is signed, returning France's borders to their 1792 extent. Napoleon is exiled to Elba on the same day.
- June 4 – Charter of 1814: Louis XVIII of France issues the Charter of 1814, a written constitution that retains royal supremacy and will remain in force from 1814 to 1815 and again from 1815 to 1830.
- June 6 – Beginning of the Allied sovereigns' visit to England: Tsar Alexander I of Russia and King Frederick William III of Prussia sail from Boulogne-Sur-Mer to Dover on board the Royal Navy ship HMS Impregnable as guests of George, Prince of Wales, the regent during the incapacity of King George III.
- June 12 – The poem "She Walks in Beauty" is written by Lord Byron.
- June 17 – In London, Alexander, Frederick William and George exchange their ratifications of the Peace Treaty ending the war with France.
- June 20 – Gaspar de Vigodet, Spain's last colonial administrator of the Viceroyalty of the Río de la Plata (covering nearly all of modern-day Argentina, Chile, Paraguay and Uruguay), surrenders the city of Montevideo to independence fighters, led by General Carlos María de Alvear.
- June 21 – The secret Eight Articles of London are signed between the Great Powers, uniting the Low Countries under William I of the Netherlands.
- June 28 – War of 1812 – Sinking of HMS Reindeer by USS Wasp.

=== July–September ===
- July 3 – War of 1812 – Capture of Fort Erie by the Americans under Major General Jacob Brown.
- July 5 – War of 1812 – Battle of Chippawa: American Major General Jacob Brown defeats British General Phineas Riall at Chippawa, Ontario.
- July 7 – Walter Scott's Waverley, his first prose fiction and one of the first significant historical novels in English, is published anonymously by Archibald Constable in Edinburgh, selling out in two days.
- July 13 – The Carabinieri (the national military police of Italy) is established by Victor Emmanuel, as the police force of the Kingdom of Sardinia.
- July 19–20 – War of 1812 – Siege of Prairie du Chien: British troops and Native Americans besiege and capture the frontier settlement.
- July 19 – War of 1812 – Battle of Rock Island Rapids: British-allied tribes ambush and defeat an American expedition in Illinois.
- July 22 – War of 1812 – The Treaty of Greenville is signed between the U.S. government and Native American tribes.
- July 25
  - George Stephenson tests his first locomotive Blücher successfully in England.
  - War of 1812 – Battle of Lundy's Lane: Reinforcements arrive near Niagara Falls, Ontario for General Riall's British and Canadian force, and a bloody, all-night battle with Jacob Brown's Americans commences at 18.00 hours; Americans retreat to Fort Erie.
- July 26 – The Swedish–Norwegian War (1814) begins with a Swedish attack.
- July 28 – The revived Ligurian Republic is dissolved.
- July 29 – Swedish–Norwegian War: The invasion of Hvaler ends in a Swedish victory.
- July 30 – The Great fire of Tirschenreuth in Bavaria destroys the town and 907 buildings.
- August 1 – The Grand Jubilee of 1814 is held in Britain, celebrating the hundredth anniversary of the Hanoverian Succession
- August 2 – Swedish–Norwegian War: Battle of Lier ends in a Norwegian victory.
- August 4
  - War of 1812 – Battle of Mackinac Island results in a British victory over an American invasion.
  - Swedish–Norwegian War (1814) – Battle of Fredrikstad ends in a Swedish victory.
  - War of 1812 – The British Siege of Fort Erie begins.
- August 5 – Swedish–Norwegian War: the Battle of Matrand ends in a Norwegian victory.
- August 7 – Pope Pius VII decrees the bull Sollicitudo omnium ecclesiarum, reestablishing the Society of Jesus (Jesuits) all over the world, after having approved their survival and existence in Russia.
- August 9
  - Creek War – The Treaty of Fort Jackson is signed, ending the Creek War.
  - Swedish–Norwegian War (1814) – Battle of Langnes ends in a Norwegian victory.
- August 12 – In England, the last hanging under the Black Act is carried out, of William Potter for cutting down an orchard (although the judge petitions for reprieve).
- August 13 – The Anglo-Dutch Treaty of 1814 is signed in London, returning most possessions of the Dutch Empire acquired by the United Kingdom since 1803 to the Netherlands, although Britain retains the Cape of Good Hope and the South American settlements of Demerara, Essequibo and Berbice (later consolidated as British Guiana). In addition, the British cede the island of Banca off the island of Sumatra, in exchange for the settlement of Cochin, India.
- August 13–September 6 – War of 1812 – Engagements on Lake Huron result in British victory.
- August 14
  - Swedish–Norwegian War (1814) – The Battle of Kjølberg Bridge ends in Swedish victory.
  - Swedish–Norwegian War (1814) – The Convention of Moss is signed, ending the Swedish–Norwegian War.
- August 24 – War of 1812 – Burning of Washington: British troops, after defeating American forces at the Battle of Bladensburg, occupy Washington, D.C., setting numerous buildings on fire, including the Capitol and Presidential Mansion.
- August 26 – Chilean War of Independence – Battle of Las Tres Acequias ends in victory for the forces of Jose Miguel Carrera.
- August 31 – War of 1812 – Battle of Caulk's Field: American militia defeats British landing.

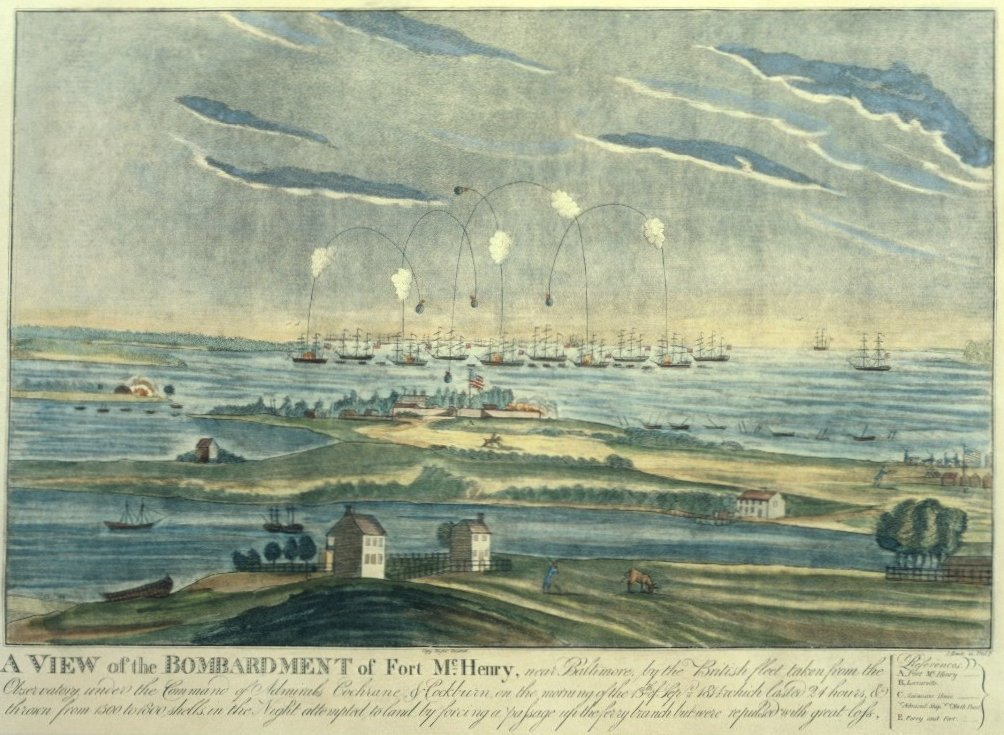
September 13: Bombardment of Fort McHenry

- September 1 – War of 1812 – Sinking of HMS Avon by the USS Wasp.
- September 2 – War of 1812 – Raid on Alexandria ends in a British victory.
- September 3 – War of 1812 – Battle of Hampden ends in a British victory.
- September 11 – War of 1812 – Battle of Lake Champlain: An American squadron under Thomas Macdonough defeats the British squadron, ultimately forcing the invading army to retreat into Canada.
- September 12 – War of 1812 – Battle of North Point: An American detachment halts the British land advance to Baltimore.
- September 13 – War of 1812: The British bombard Fort McHenry at Baltimore. The British failure at the Battle of Baltimore is a turning point in the war, and the American defense of the fort inspires Francis Scott Key to compose the poem (later set to music as) The Star-Spangled Banner.
- September 21 – War of 1812: – British Siege of Fort Erie fails.
- September 27
  - War of 1812 – Battle of Fayal ends in an American victory over the British.
  - Hadži-Prodan's rebellion against the Ottoman Empire begins.

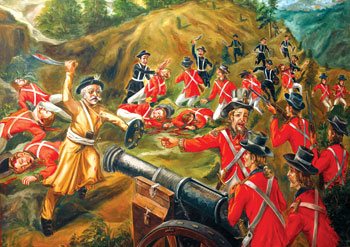
November 1: Anglo-Nepalese war begins

=== October–December ===
- October 17 – London Beer Flood: A large vat full of porter owned by Meux's Brewery of London bursts, demolishing buildings and killing 8 people.
- October 19 – War of 1812: – Battle of Cook's Mills: U.S. forces defeat the British in Upper Canada.
- November 1
  - Francis Rawdon-Hastings, the Governor-General of India declares war on Kingdom of Nepal and Anglo-Nepalese War begins.
  - The Congress of Vienna formally opens in Austria to settle the many issues arising from the French Revolutionary Wars, the Napoleonic Wars, and the dissolution of the Holy Roman Empire, with the European powers agreeing upon the redrawing of national borders following the victory over France; it will last until June 9, 1815.
- November 4 – King Charles XIII of Sweden becomes King of Norway, as Charles II .
- November 7 – War of 1812: Andrew Jackson seizes Pensacola, Florida.
- December 15 – War of 1812: The Hartford Convention is convened, by members of the American Federalist Party.
- December 24 – War of 1812: The Treaty of Ghent is signed, formally ending the war.
- December 25 – Samuel Marsden of the Church Missionary Society preaches the first sermon in New Zealand, probably in the Māori language, at Oihi.

=== Date unknown ===
- The world's first complex machine mass-produced from interchangeable parts, Eli Terry's wooden pillar-and-scroll clock, comes off the production line in Plymouth, Connecticut.

== Births ==
=== January–June ===
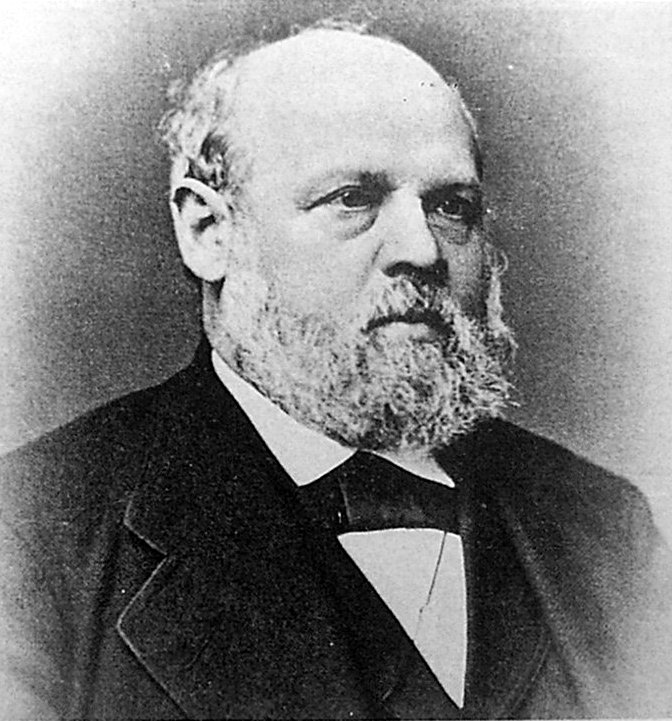
Heinrich Geissler

- January 1
  - William Bigler, American politician (d. 1880)
  - Hong Xiuquan, Chinese rebel (d. 1864)
- January 27 – Eugène Viollet-le-Duc, French architect (d. 1879)
- January 11 – James Paget English surgeon (d. 1899)
- February 9 – Samuel J. Tilden, 25th Governor of New York, 1876 Democratic Party Presidential Nominee (d. 1886)
- February 18 – Samuel Fenton Cary, American politician, temperance activist (d. 1900)
- March 9 – Taras Shevchenko, Ukrainian poet (d. 1861)
- March 17 – Kamehameha III, King of the Hawaiian Islands (d. 1854)
- April 3 – Lorenzo Snow, 5th president of the Church of Jesus Christ of Latter-day Saints (d. 1901)
- April 21 – Angela Burdett-Coutts, 1st Baroness Burdett-Coutts, English philanthropist (d. 1906)
- May 7 – Henriette Hansen, Norwegian ballerina, singer and actor (d. 1892)
- May 12 – Adolf von Henselt, German composer (d. 1889)
- May 26
  - Wilhelm Engerth, Austrian architect, engineer (d. 1884)
  - Heinrich Geißler, German physicist (d. 1879)
- May 30
  - Mikhail Bakunin, Russian anarchist (d. 1876)
  - Eugène Charles Catalan, French and Belgian mathematician (d. 1894)
- June 21– Paweł Bryliński, Polish sculptor (d. 1890)

=== July–December ===
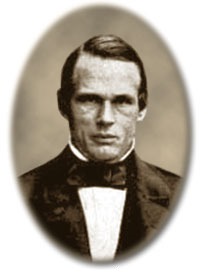
Anders Jonas Ångström

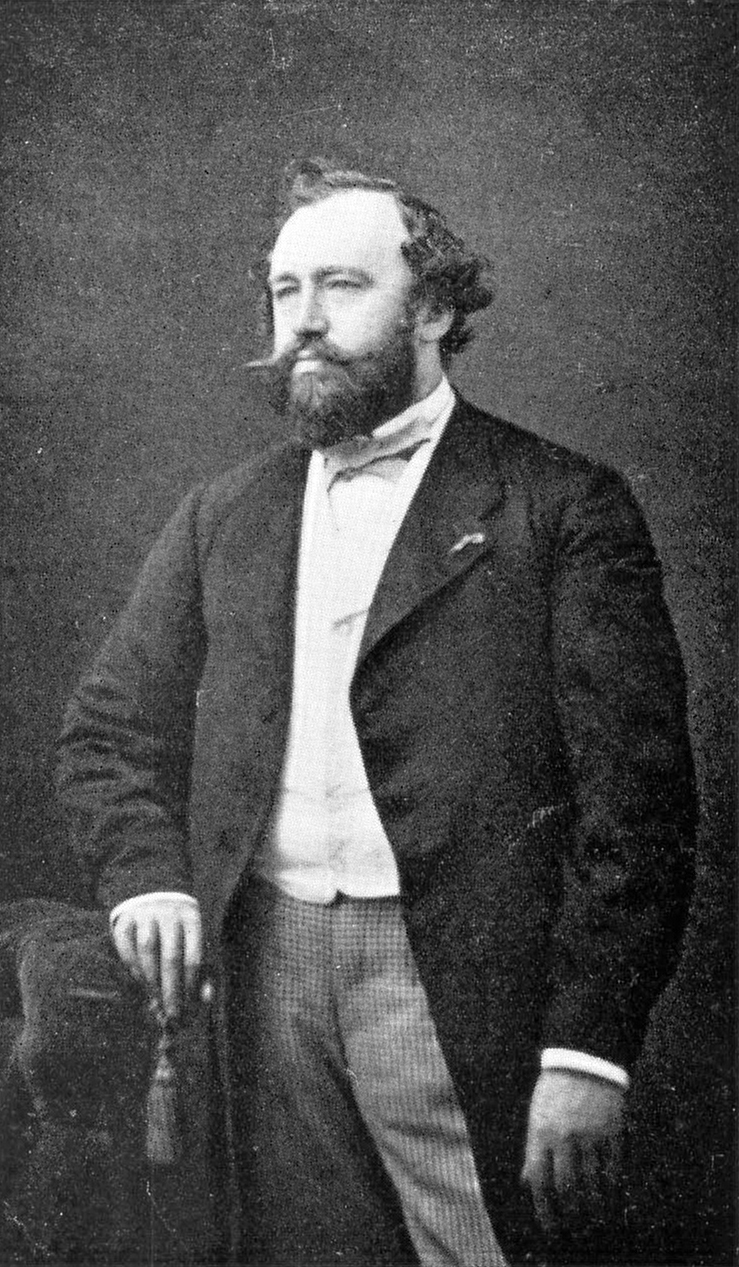
Adolphe Sax

- July 3 – Ferdinand Didrichsen, Danish botanist, physicist (d. 1887)
- July 11 – Louis Melsens, Belgian chemist and physicist (d. 1886)
- July 19
  - Samuel Colt, American gun maker (d. 1862)
  - Ludwig von Gablenz, Austrian general (d. 1874)
- August 8 – Esther Morris, American suffragist, judge (d. 1902)
- August 10 – Henri Nestlé, German-born Swiss chocolate magnate (d. 1890)
- August 13 – Anders Jonas Ångström, Swedish physicist (d. 1874)
- August 23 – James Roosevelt Bayley, American bishop (d. 1877)
- August 28 – Sheridan Le Fanu, Irish writer (d. 1873)
- September 2 – Ernst Curtius, German archaeologist, historian (d. 1896)
- September 3 – James Joseph Sylvester, English mathematician (d. 1897)
- September 6 – George-Étienne Cartier, Canadian lawyer, politician (d. 1873)
- September 7 – William Butterfield, British architect (d. 1900)
- September 8 – Charles Étienne Brasseur de Bourbourg, French writer, historian (d. 1874)
- September 27 – Daniel Kirkwood, American astronomer (d. 1895)
- October 1 – Josefina Deland, Swedish women's rights activist (d. 1890)
- October 4 – Jean-François Millet, French painter (d. 1875)
- October 7 – Susanna Dickinson, survivor of the Alamo (d. 1883)
- October 15 – Mikhail Lermontov, Russian writer (d. 1841)
- November 6 – Adolphe Sax, Belgian musical instrument maker, inventor (d. 1894)
- November 13 – Joseph Hooker, American general (d. 1879)
- November 22 – Serranus Clinton Hastings, American politician (d. 1893)
- November 25 – Julius von Mayer, German physician, physicist, one of the founders of thermodynamics (d. 1878)
- November 26 – Luise Aston, German author, feminist (d. 1871)
- December 12 – Juan Prim, 1st Marquis of los Castillejos, Prime Minister of Spain (d. 1870)
- December 13 – Ana Néri, Brazilian nurse, matron of nursing in that country (d. 1880)
- December 18 – Sarah T. Bolton, née Sarah Tittle Barrett, American poet (d. 1893)

=== Date unknown ===
- Táhirih, Persian Bahá'í heroine (d. 1852)
- Pavlos Kalligas, Greek jurist, politician (d. 1896)
- Antoinette Nording, Swedish perfume entrepreneur (d. 1887)

== Deaths ==
=== January–June ===
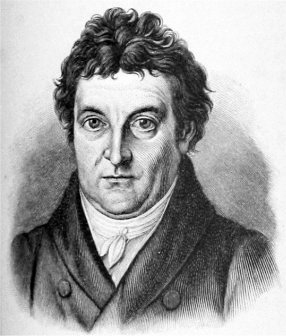
Johann Gottlieb Fichte

- January 7 – Ira Allen, founder of Vermont, leader of the Green Mountain Boys (b. 1751)
- January 16 – Friedrich Karl Wilhelm, Fürst zu Hohenlohe, Austrian general (b. 1752)
- January 26 – Manuel do Cenáculo, Portuguese prelate and antiquarian (b. 1724)
- January 27
  - Philip Astley, English circus promoter (b. 1742)
  - Johann Gottlieb Fichte, German philosopher (b. 1762)
- February 26 – John Cleves Symmes, American statesman (b. 1742)
- February 27 – Margaret Bingham British countess, painter and writer (b. 1740)
- March 6 – Angelica Schuyler Church, daughter of Genl.Philip Schuyler, sister to Elizabeth Schuyler Hamilton (b. 1756)
- March 18 – Vincent Abbadie, French surgeon (b. 1737)
- March 26 – Joseph-Ignace Guillotin, French physician (b. 1738)
- April 1 – Joseph de Ferraris, Austrian cartographer of the Austrian Netherlands (b. 1726)
- April 12 – Charles Burney, English music historian (b. 1726)
- April 19 – Thomas Brudenell-Bruce, 1st Earl of Ailesbury, England (b. 1729)
- May 2
  - Thomas Coke, first American Methodist Bishop (b. 1747)
  - Alexander Hood, British naval officer (b. 1726)
- May 5 – Abdullah I Al-Sabah, Kuwaiti ruler (b. 1740)
- May 6
  - Stephen Amherst, English cricketer (b. 1750)
  - Georg Joseph Vogler, German composer (b. 1749)
- May 27 – Ivan Akimov, Russian painter (b. 1754)
- May 29 – Joséphine de Beauharnais, Empress of France (b. 1763)
- June 14 – Antin Angelovych, Greek-Catholic metropolitan (b. 1756)
- June 27 – Johann Friedrich Reichardt, German composer (b. 1752)

=== July–December ===
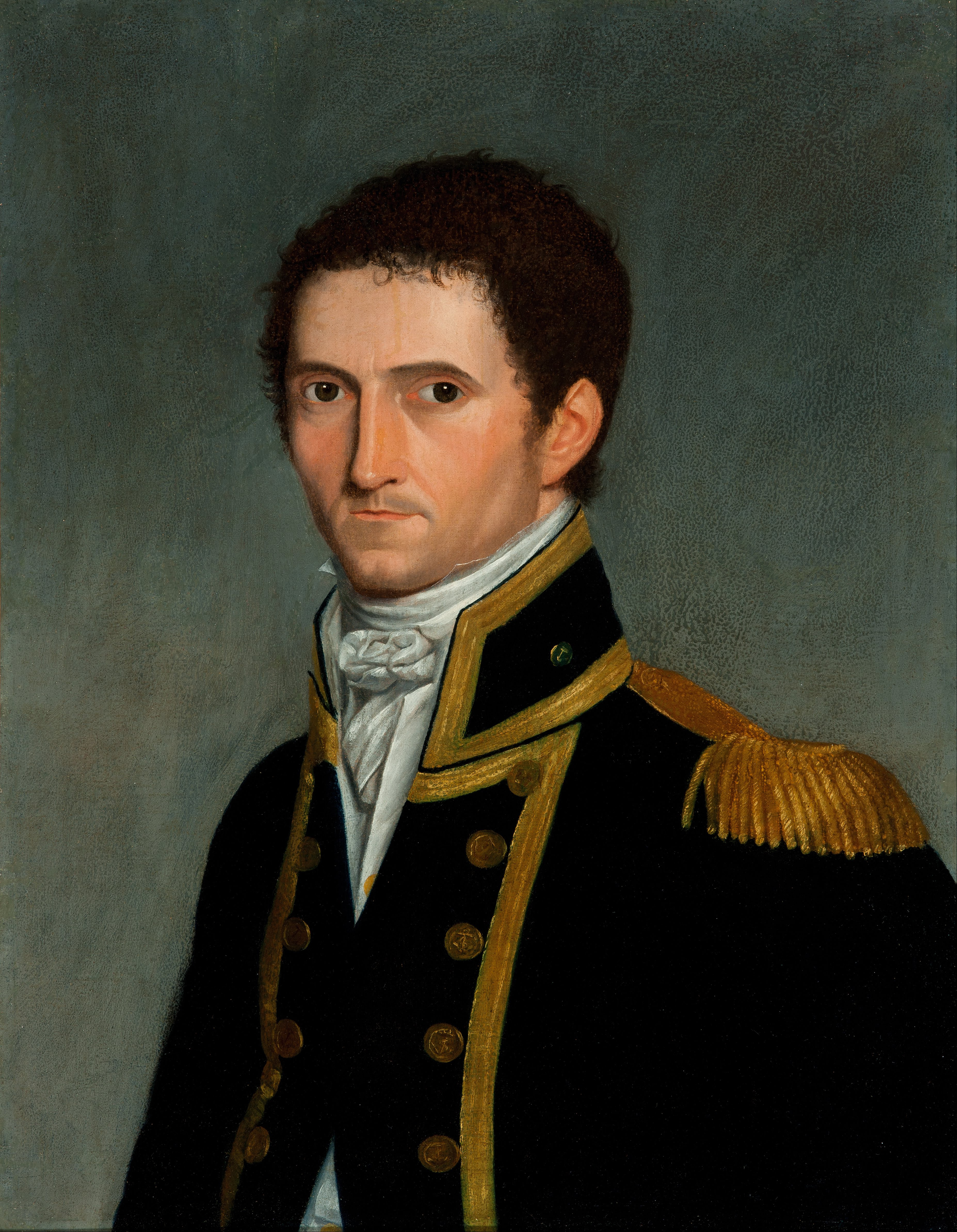
Matthew Flinders

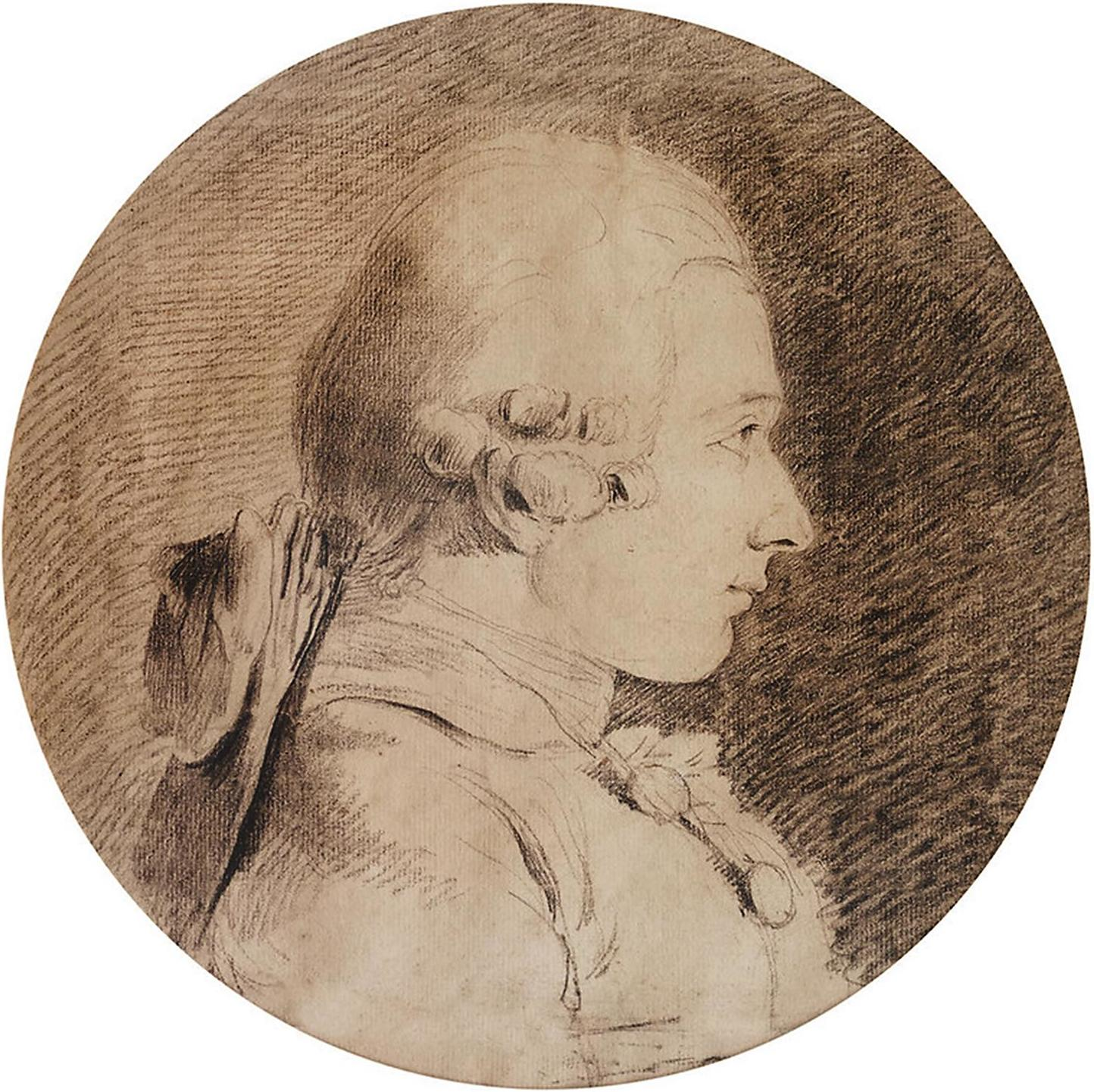
Marquis de Sade

- July 12 – William Howe, 5th Viscount Howe, British general (b. 1729)
- July 18 – Miles Peter Andrews, English playwright, legislator (b. 1742)
- July 19 – Captain Matthew Flinders, English explorer of the coasts of Australia (b. 1774)
- July 25 – Charles Dibdin, English composer (b. 1745)
- August 21
  - Antonio Carnicero, Spanish painter (b. 1748)
  - Benjamin Thompson, American physicist, inventor (b. 1753)
- August 28 – Erik Must Angell, Norwegian jurist, politician (b. 1744)
- August 31 – Arthur Phillip, British admiral, 1st Governor of New South Wales (b. 1738)
- September 8 – Maria Carolina of Austria, queen of Ferdinand I of the Two Sicilies, and de facto ruler (b. 1752)
- September 22 – August Wilhelm Iffland, German actor (b. 1759)
- October 1 – Guillaume-Antoine Olivier, French entomologist (b. 1756)
- October 4 – Samuel Jackson Pratt, English writer, poet and actor (b. 1749)
- October 19 – Mercy Otis Warren, American playwright (b. 1728)
- November 18 – Aleijadinho, Colonial Brazil-born sculptor and architect (b. 1730 or 1738)
- November 23 – Elbridge Gerry, 5th Vice President of the United States (b. 1744)
- December 2 – Marquis de Sade, French writer for whom sadism is named (b. 1740)
- December 13 – Charles-Joseph, 7th Prince of Ligne, Austrian field marshal (b. 1735)
- December 19 – Joseph Bramah, English inventor of the hydraulic press (b. 1748)
- December 26 – Nicolas-François Guillard, French librettist (b. 1752)
