= Maria Christina Strömberg =

Swedish actress

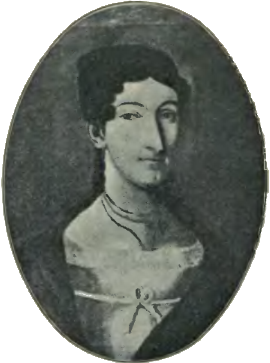
Maria Christina Sophia Ehrnström

Maria Christina Sophia Strömberg née Ehrnström (1777 – 17 September 1853) was a Swedish ballet dancer, actress and instructor in dance and drama. She was married to Johan Peter Strömberg (1773–1834) and active with him in Norway, where the couple both made a pioneer contribution within their fields.

== Biography ==
Maria Christina Strömberg was a student of Louis Gallodier at the Royal Swedish Ballet in Stockholm. She was not given a position at the Royal Swedish Opera, but was employed in smaller theatre companies touring Sweden. She is known to have both performed as a dancer, as well as an actress. In Norrköping in 1797, she married Johan Peter Strömberg, after which she followed him in the theatre companies in which he was employed.

She was engaged in the theatre company of her spouse, and thus in the pioneer theatres he attempted to establish in Uddevalla in 1798–99, and in Nyköping in 1800–02. Between 1802 and 1811, the couple toured Norway, where there was yet no established professional theatre activity. She and her husband gave lessons in dance and drama in Trondheim (1803–05), in Kristiansund (1804–05) and in Det Dramatiske Selskab in Oslo (1806–09); she instructed the female students, while her husband instructed the male students. While ballet dance as well as dance instructions had been offered previously in Norway (by Madame Stuart), Maria Christina Strömberg was possibly the first woman with confirmed formal ballet training to do so.

In 1817–21, the Strömberg couple resided in Gothenburg, where she was active as a dance instructor. They returned to Norway in 1822. Between 1826–27, her husband founded and managed the first permanent professional theatre in Norway, Christiania Offentlige Theater.

Maria Christina Strömberg died of cholera.

== Other sources ==
- Næss, Trine. (2009, 13. februar). Johan Peter Strömberg. I Norsk biografisk leksikon. Hentet 11 September 2018 fra
- Wilhelm Berg: Anteckningar om Göteborgs äldre teatrar / Band 2. 1794–1816 (1896–1900)
