= Andrine Christensen =

Norwegian actress and dancer (1814–1853)

- Born: 9 February 1814; Aker, Norway
- Died: 2 September 1853 (aged 39)
- Spouse: Mathias Peter Janus Neuberg (m. 1832)

Andrine Christensen (9 February 1814 – 2 September 1853) was a Norwegian actress and dancer.

== Early and personal life ==
Andrine Christensen was born on 9 February 1814 in Aker to Hans Nicolay Johansen and Ellen Christensen. On 15 March 1832, she married Mathias Peter Janus Neuberg (1805–1877) in Christiania. She was the mother-in-law of theologian and educator Peter Laurentius Larsen.

== Career ==
Andrine Christensen was a pupil at Johan Peter Strömberg's theatre in Christiania from its opening on 30 January 1827. On the opening day, at the age of 12, she performed a ballet with fellow actress and dancer Henriette Hansen as well as solo parts in the dance divertissement, and the performance was well received. She and Hansen were described as the foster children of Strömberg.

She made her acting debut at the same theatre on 21 March 1827 as Jacob in Drengene fra Auvergne. The same summer, she travelled with Stromberg's theatre for a long guest performance in Drammen, before the company embarked on a tour.

When theatre director Strömberg had to rent out the theatre building in 1828 to the newly established Christiania Public Theatre, he ensured in the lease that Christensen and actress Henriette Hansen would be allowed to continue performing for a fee of 100 speciedaler a year.

== Death ==
Christensen died on 2 September 1853, at the age of 39.
