= Henriette Hansen (actress) =

Norwegian actress, singer and dancer (1814–1892)

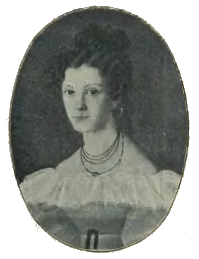
Henriette Hansen

Henriette Hansen (7 May 1814 – 20 November 1892), was a Norwegian stage actress, opera singer and ballet dancer. She belonged to the pioneer generation of the first public theatre in Norway, the theatre of Christiania Offentlige Theater in Oslo in 1827. This being the first public stage in Norway, she may be regarded as the first native professional ballet dancer in Norway: the first ballet dancer in Norway was likely the foreign born Christina Doreothea Stuart.

== Biography ==
Henriette Hansen was born in Christiania, (now Oslo), Norway. She was the daughter of tradesman Christopher Hansen and Gunhild Jensdatter.

In Norway, professional theatre was long managed by travelling theatre companies from Denmark and Sweden. In 1827, the first public theatre, which was to be the Christiania Theater, was opened in Oslo by the Swedish actor Johan Peter Strömberg (1773–1834). Strömberg had the ambition to create Norwegian actors.

On the inauguration of the Strömberg theatre on 30 January 1827, a ballet was performed by the Norwegian dancers Henriette Hansen and Andrine (Randine) Christensen, who were described as the foster children of Strömberg, followed by the play Hustrun, translated from Die deutsche Hausfrau by German dramatist August von Kotzebue (1761–1819).

The main parts is believed to have been played by Erike Kirstine Kolstad (1792-1830), and her colleague Boiflin. Henriette Hansen was given very good critic for her talents both within singing, dancing and acting. However, she left the stage in 1831 after her marriage to dramatist and judge Henrik Anker Bjerregaard (1831–1842).
