= Erike Kirstine Kolstad =

Norwegian actress

Erike (or Ericha) Kirstine Kolstad (c. 1792–14 April 1830), was a Norwegian stage actress. She belonged to the pioneer generation of the first public theatre in Norway, the theatre of Christiania Offentlige Theater in Oslo in 1827. She is the first Norwegian actress known by name of this theatre, the first in Norway and thereby also the first professional native actress of her country.

== Life ==
Erike Kirstine Kolstad was the daughter of the procurator Erich Kolstad and Birgitha Maria Walseth. She married the actor Poul Jensen Boiflin (1797-1841) in 1829.

Kolstad reportedly made her debut at the stage of the carpenters guild in Trondheim. On 30 January 1827, the first professional theatre, the Strömberg Theatre, was inaugurated by Johan Peter Strömberg in Oslo. Strömberg, an actor from Sweden, had the ambition to create native Norwegian actors in a country where theatre until then had been performed only by travelling foreign theatre companies, and his theatre was inaugurated by a ballet performed by the Norwegian dancers Henriette Hansen and Andrine (Randine) Christensen, followed by the play Hustrun, translated from Die deutsche Hausfrau by August von Kotzebue, where the main roles were performed by Kolstad and Poul Jensen Boiflin.

Kolstad and Boiflin are described as the leading actors of the theatre during its very first years. She was described as a talented comedy actor and a soubrette. Kolstad was engaged at the theatre until her death in 1830. After these very first years, however, the theatre's staff was mainly composed of Danes until the 1850s. Her daughter Clara Laura Boiflin (1829-1925) also became an actor.
