= Augusta Schrumpf =

- Born: Augusta Smith; 19 November 1813; Copenhagen, Denmark-Norway
- Died: 7 January 1900 (aged 86)
- Other name: Augusta Smith
- Spouse: August Schrumpf

Augusta Schrumpf, née Smith (19 November 1813 – 7 January 1900) was a Norwegian dramatic actress and operatic soprano. She was the prima donna of the national stage of Norway in the first half of the 19th century. She belonged to the pioneer troupe of artists at the Norwegian national stage, and could be regarded as the first opera singer in Norway.

== Life ==
Augusta Smith was born in Copenhagen, Denmark as the daughter of Konsumtionskasserer - a lower official - Halvor Smith (1770-1835) and Ellen Marie Lundgren (d. April 1859). Her father was Norwegian, and her mother was Swedish. She married the violinist August Schrumpf in 1832.

=== Career ===
Augusta Schrumpf was engaged at the Strömberg Theatre (later known as the Christiania Theatre) in Oslo from 1829 to 1860. Founded by Johan Peter Strömberg only two years previously, the theatre was Norway's first and (at that time only) permanent theatre and the national stage in the 19th century. Until the employment of Laura Gundersen in 1849, however, the theatre employed almost exclusively actors from Denmark and Germany, in large because Norway did not yet have an established theatre school and trained actors.

Augusta Schrumpf was initially engaged by Jens Lang Bøcher as a student actor, but she soon raised to be a main attraction of the theatre. She debuted 21 September 1829 as Rosine in The Barber of Seville by Pierre Beaumarchais.

While Norway did not have an opera, the theatre, being the only stage in the country, occasionally offered opera performances and operetta when there where actors able to sing as well. In the season of 1831–32, Deux mots by Nicolas Dalayrac was performed in Oslo, directed by August Schrumpf and with Augusta Schrumpf in the main female part. This was the premiere of the art of opera in Norway. The performance was also a great success for Augusta Schrumpf, and for the remaining years of her career, she was often engaged to perform female main parts, whenever opera performances where offered at the theatre. During the 1830s- and 1840s, she was a leading primadonna of the Norwegian stage, the arguably first in the country. As opera singer she was in some regard replaced by Betty Smidth and Clara Ursin.

During the 1850s, there were a growing criticisms that no Norwegian actors were active on the Norwegian stage. Augusta Schrumpf gave her last performance on 16 March 1860, and then settled in Bergen, provided with a pension.

=== Roles ===
Augusta Schrumpf did not belong to a particular genre, but performed all sorts of parts, from tragedy to vaudeville. She was described as natural, warm and sensitive in her way of acting.

In 1837, when the theatre was re-opened under the new name Christiania Theatre, she played Hildur in Kung Sverres ungdom by A. Munchin the inauguration performance. Among her roles were Fenella in La muette de Portici by Daniel Auber (1843), where she received much praise, and Angela in Le domino noir by Auber.

Aside from her stage career, she participated in concerts arranged by the musical society which performed chosen excerpts of famous operas in Oslo during this time. One such occasion was when she performed an aria from La clemenza di Tito by Mozart (1833).

== See also ==
- Madame Stuart
