= Betty Smidth =

Danish stage actress and opera soprano

Betzy "Betty" Christiane Smidth (5 March 1819 – 31 January 1892) was a Danish stage actress and opera soprano. She is known to have been the opera primadonna of the Norwegian stage in the mid-19th century.

She was from Denmark, and made her debut in Copenhagen in 1836. She was engaged at the Christiania Theatre in Oslo in Norway in 1837–50, where she reportedly succeeded Augusta Schrumpf as the leading operatic star of the Norwegian stage. She was particularly known for her ability as a soubrette, and among her more famed roles where Angela in Black Domino.

She resumed her career in Denmark in 1850, where she had a moderately successful career at the Kasinoteatern and Folketheatret until her retirement in 1884.
