= Sigvard Gundersen =

Norwegian actor (1842–1904)

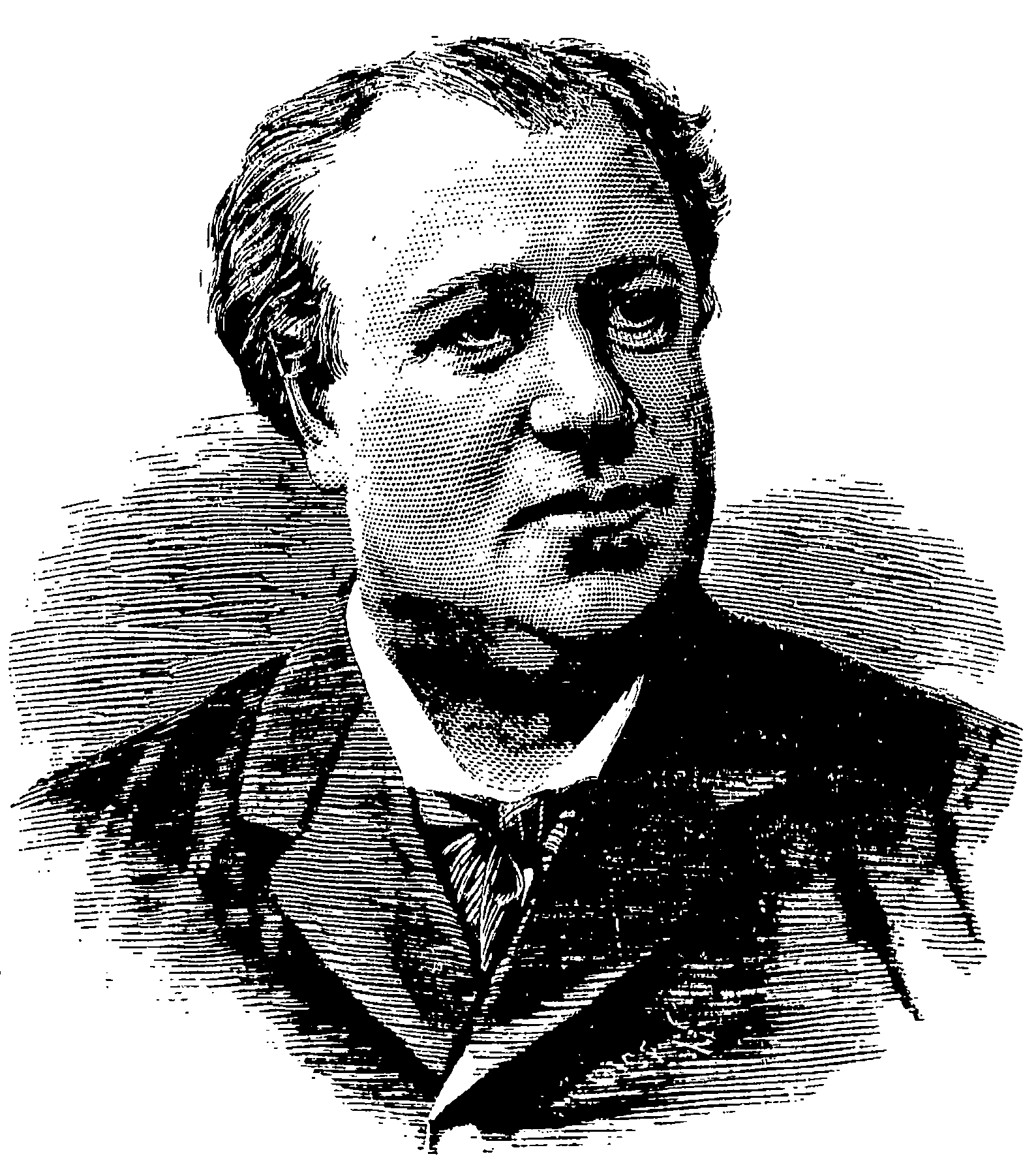
- Born: 8 November 1842; Kristiansand, Norway
- Died: 29 November 1904 (aged 62)
- Occupation: actor

Sigvard Emil Gundersen (8 November 1842 – 29 November 1904) was a Norwegian actor. He was married to actress Laura Gundersen. He made his stage début at Christiania Theater in 1862, and worked for this theatre most of his career, until 1899.

He served as the first chairman of the Norwegian Actors' Equity Association, from 1898 to 1899.
