= Throndhjems Theater =

Historic theatre in Trondheim, Norway

Coordinates: 63°25′44″N 10°23′32″E

Throndhjems Theater was a historic theatre in Trondheim in Norway, active between 1861 and 1865. It was the first permanent theatre in Trondhjem.

Previously, theater in Tronhjem had consisted of travelling theatre companies and the amateur society Det Dramatiske Selskab, who had a theater building erected in 1816. Throndhjems Theater was housed in the Gamle Scene, the theatre building of the Det Dramatiske Selskab. The theater went bankrupt in 1865. It was eventually succeeded by Trondhjems Nationale Scene (1911–1926) and finally by the Trøndelag Teater.
