= Engebret Café =

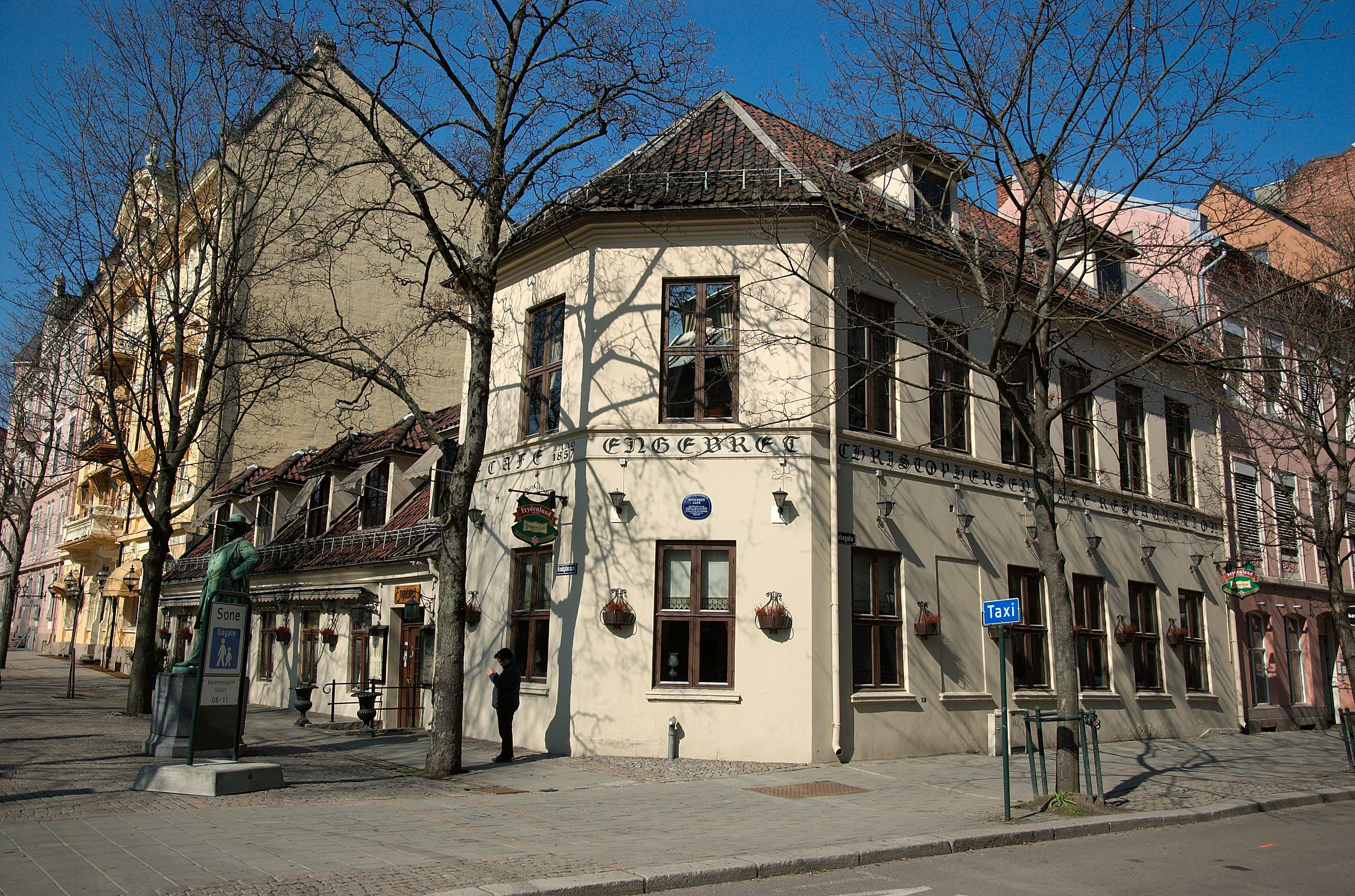
- Engebret Café
- Interactive map of Engebret Café

Restaurant information
- Established: 1848; In Rådhusgata 11
- Food type: Norwegian cuisine
- Location: 59°54′32.116″N 10°44′31.549″E; Bankplassen 1b, Oslo, N-0151, Norway
- Website: engebret-cafe.no

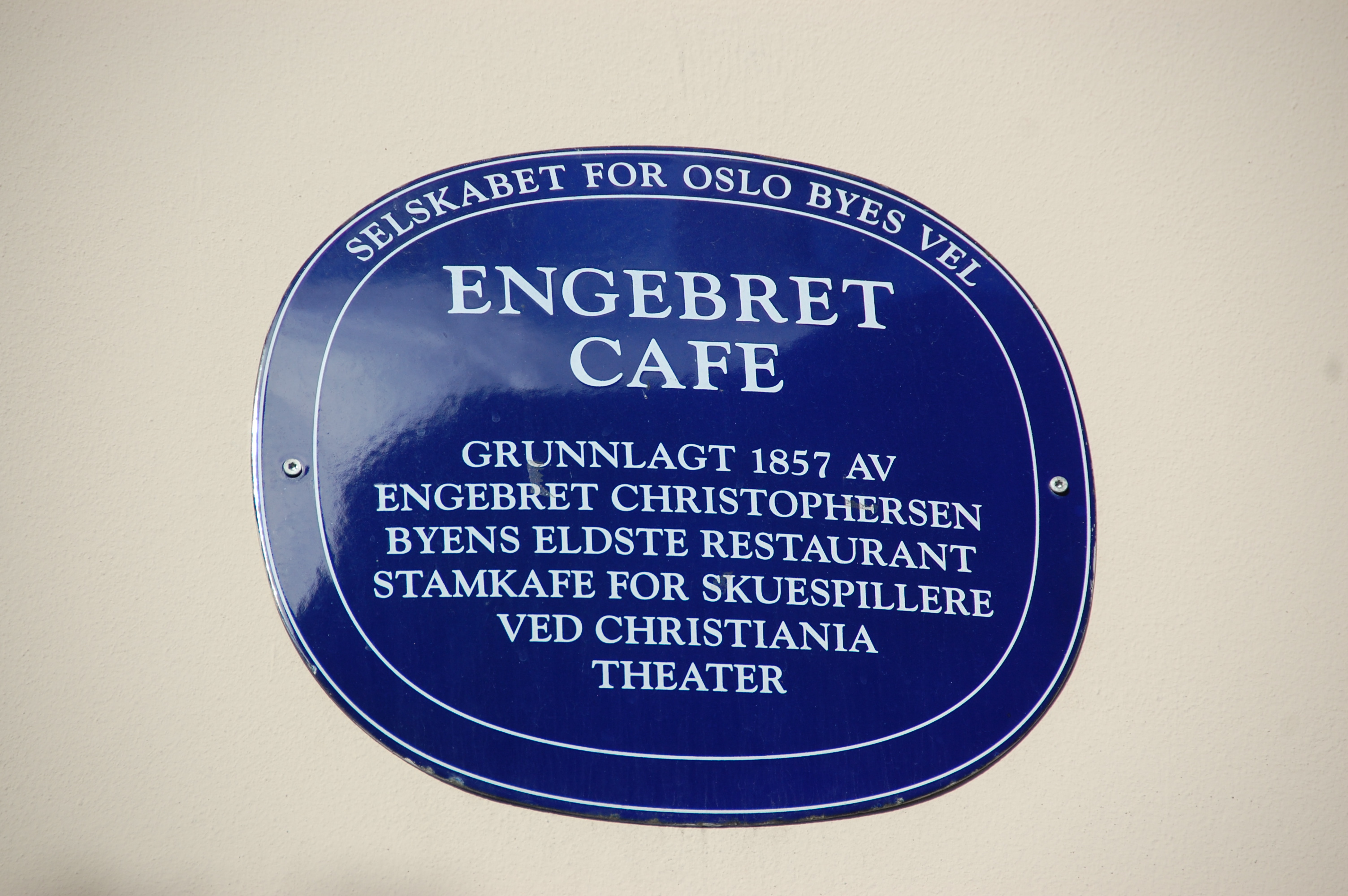
Engebret Café Cultural Heritage plaque

Engebret Café is a restaurant located at Bankplassen 1 in downtown Oslo, Norway. The food is based on exclusive (but expensive) Norwegian cuisine. The building housing the cafe dates from around 1760 and is listed and protected by law by the Norwegian Directorate for Cultural Heritage.

== History ==
Engebret Café is the oldest restaurant in continuous operation in Oslo. The restaurant is named after its founder Engebret Christoffersen, who started the restaurant in 1848. The restaurant was at first located in Rådhusgata 11, but has stayed at the square Bankplassen since 1863.

Engebret Café has during the time it has existed, undergone very few changes. In 1921 it was hit by fire. A year later it opened it again and preserved its appearance. The restaurant is known for the famous artists who have frequented the restaurant, including Henrik Ibsen, Bjørnstjerne Bjørnson, Edvard Grieg and Edvard Munch all of whom had regular tables there. The best known of the employees have been Queen Mette-Marit, who worked as a waitress at the restaurant in the late 1990s.

== Gallery ==
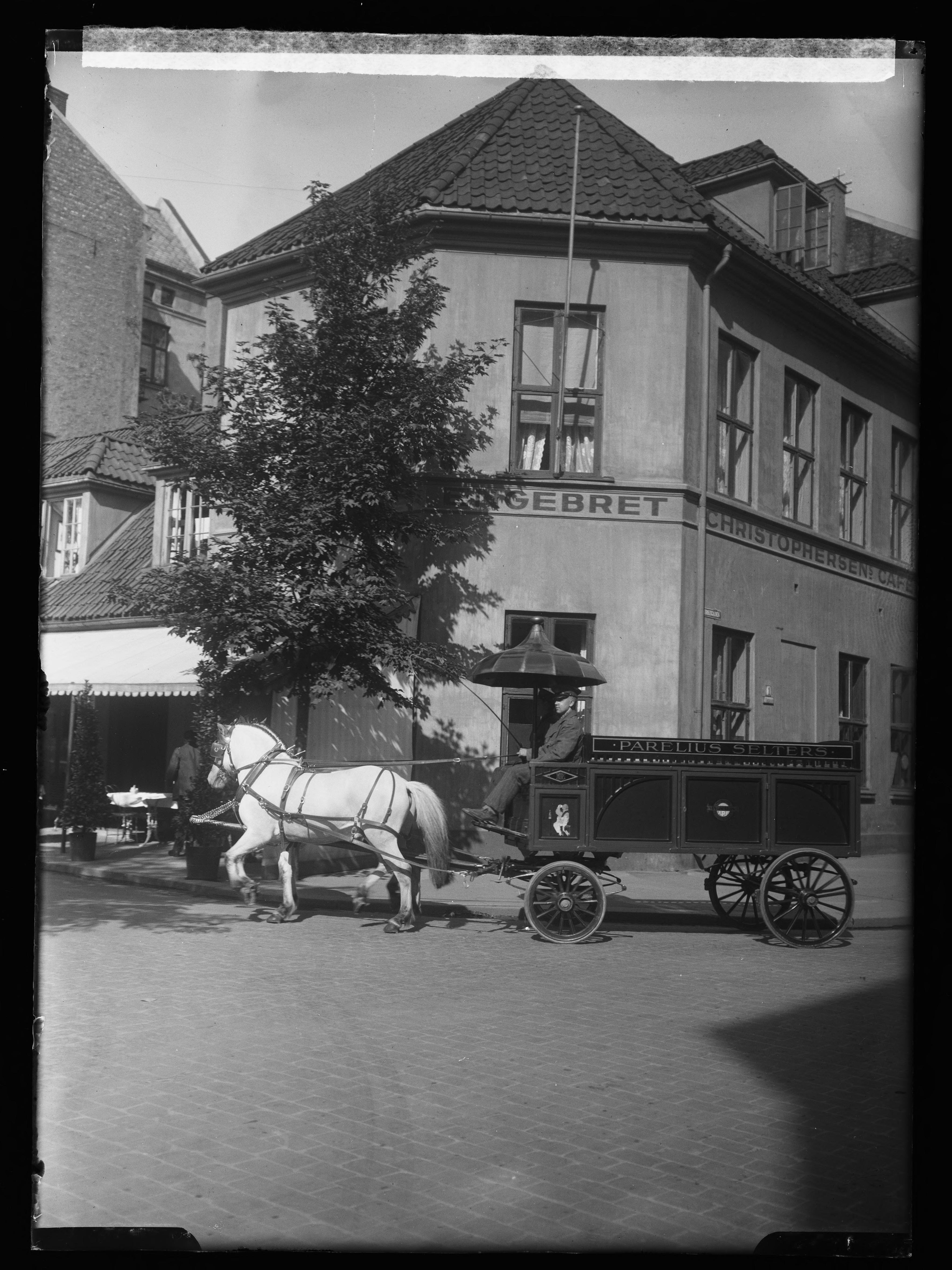
Photograph from 1920

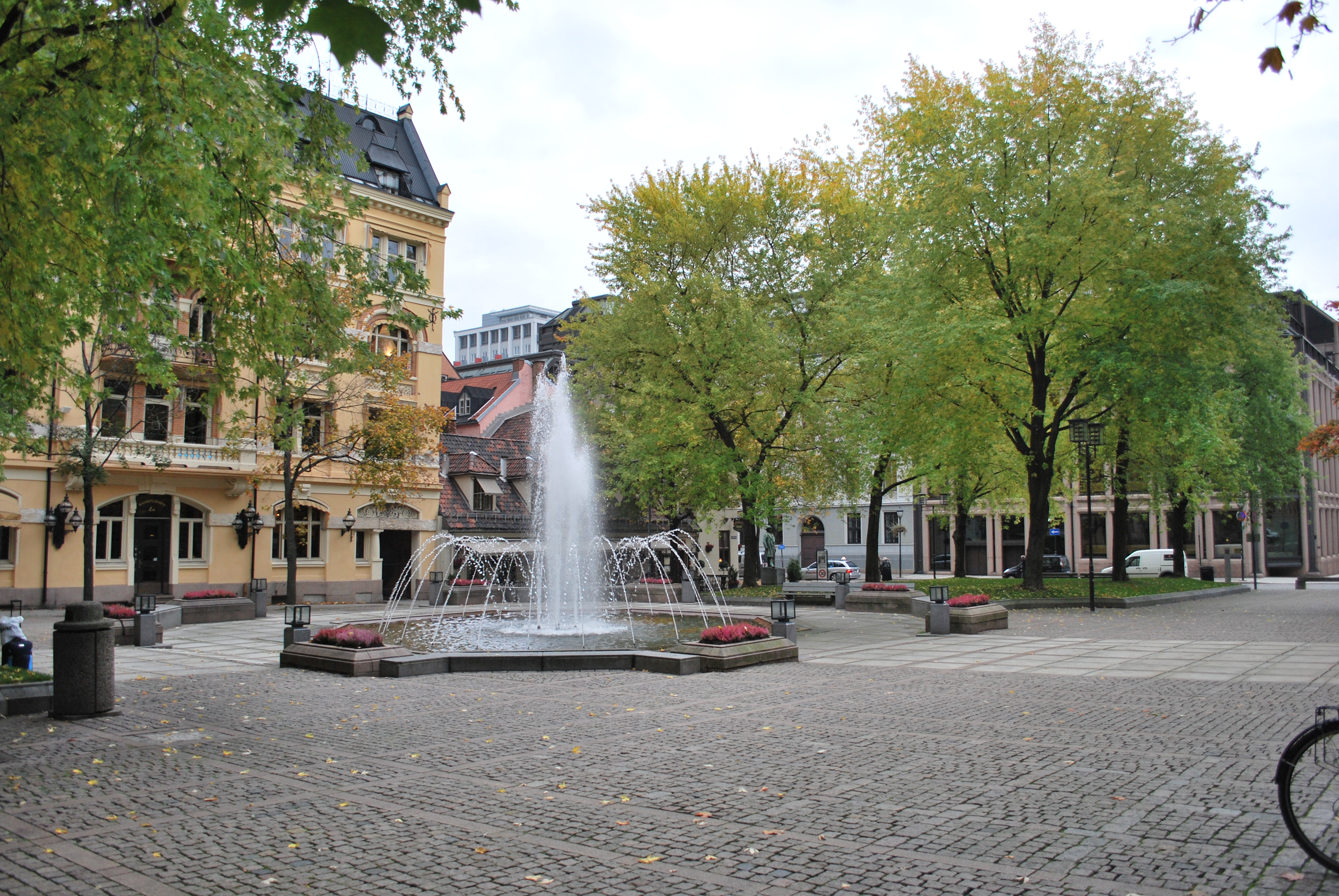
Bankplassen with Engebret Café in the background behind the fountain

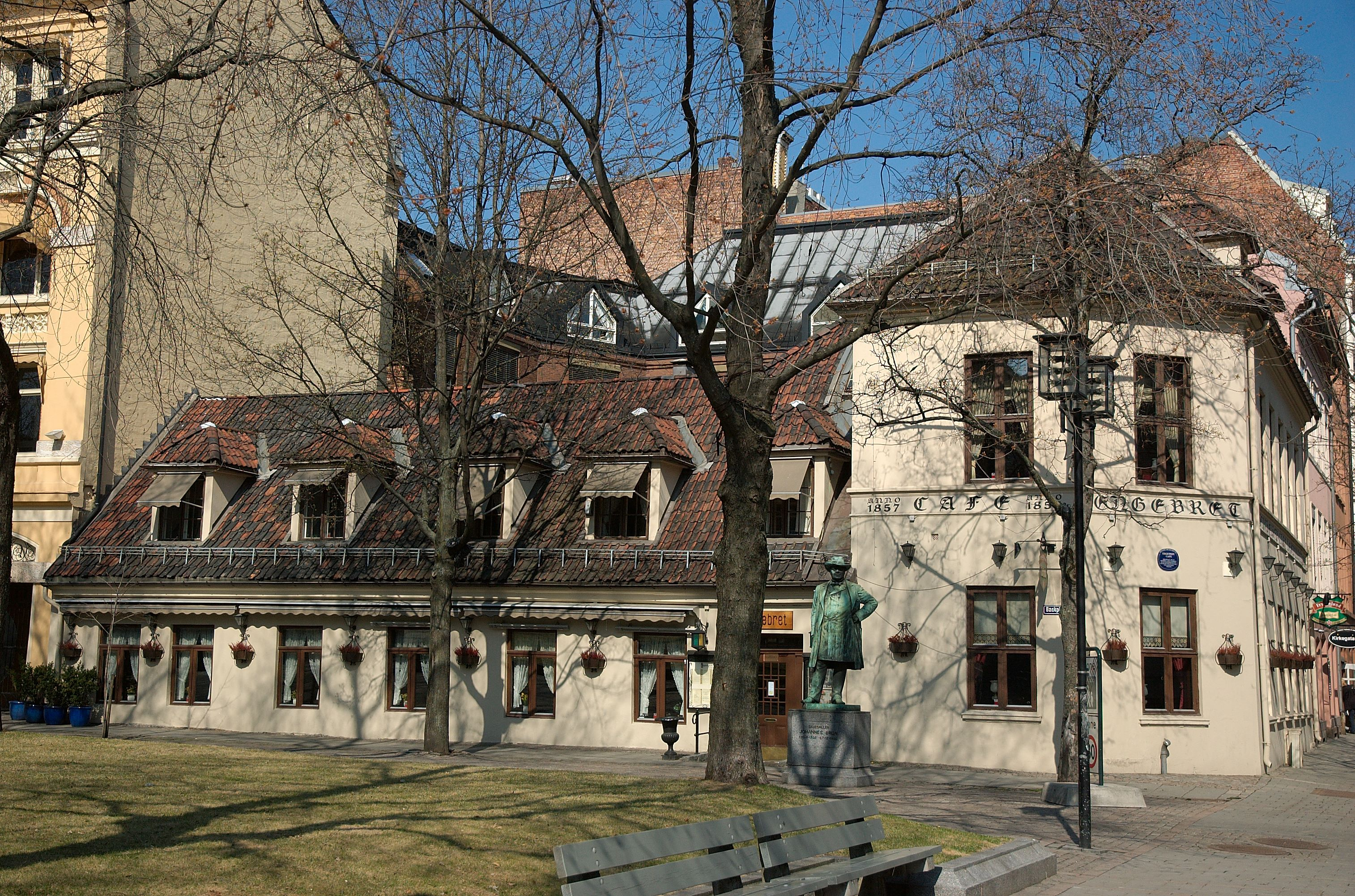
At the corner to Kirkegata

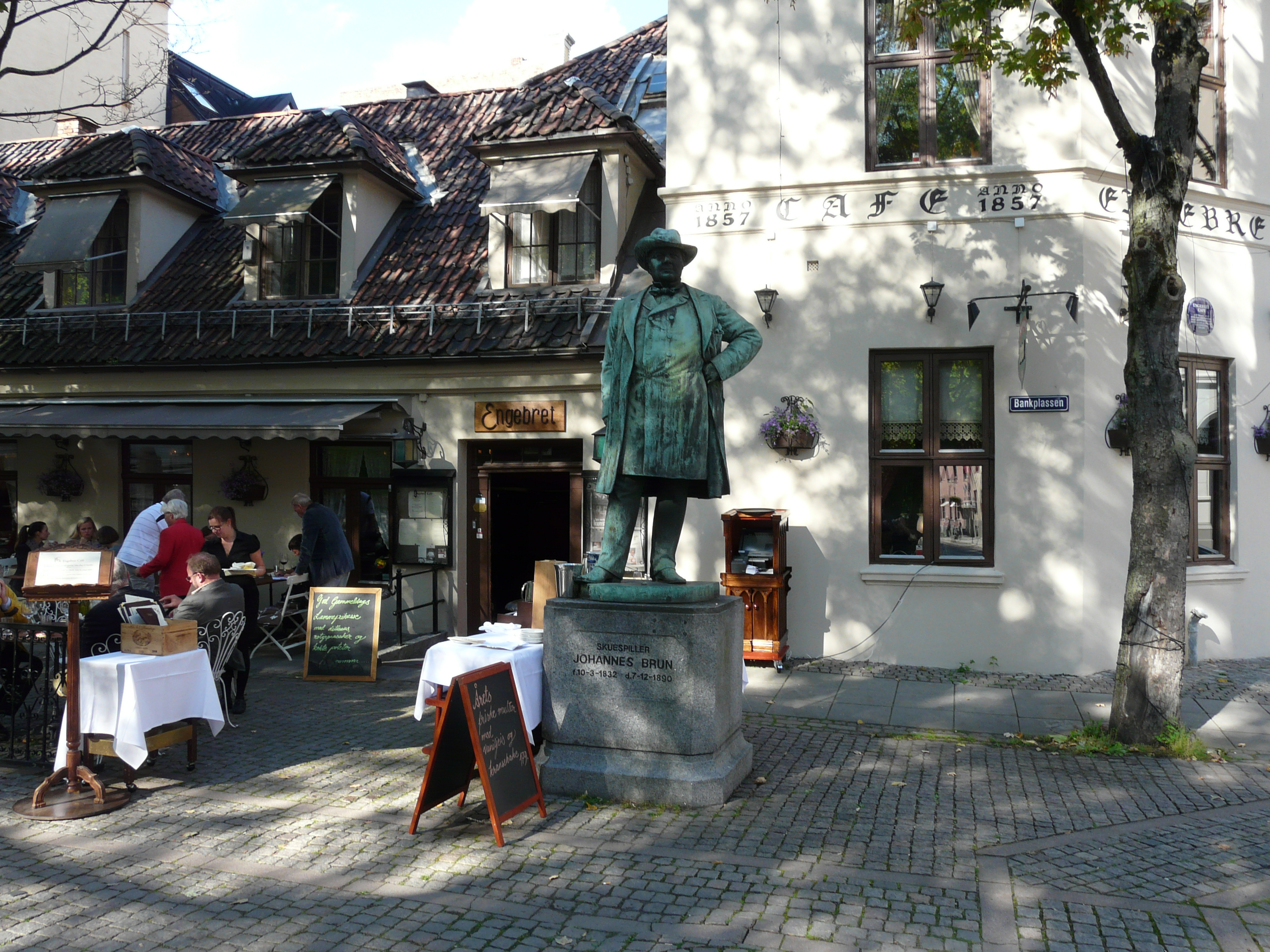
Statue of stage actor Johannes Brun at Engebret Cafè

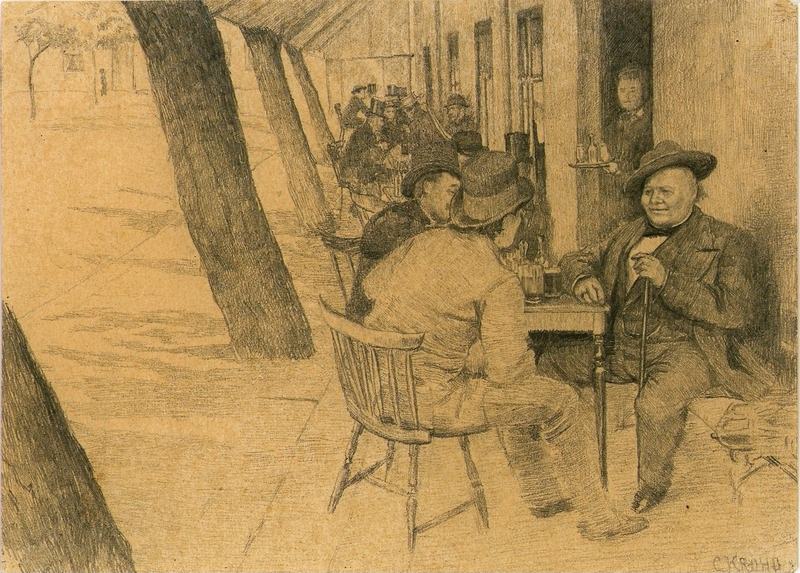
Fortaus-servering på Engebrets Kafé by Christian Krohg ca. 1880

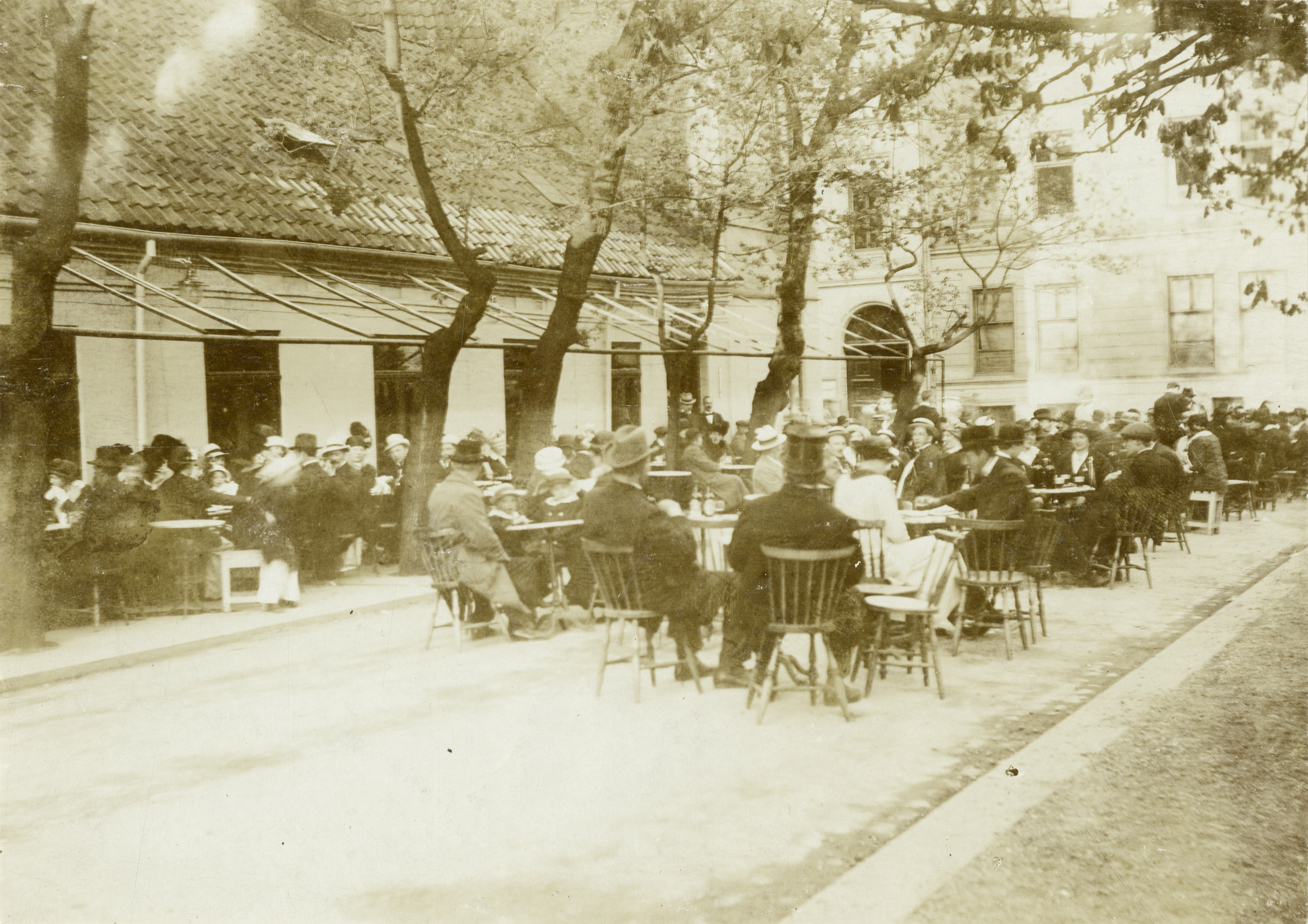
Engebret Cafè at the early 20th century

== Other sources ==
- Noel Riley Fitch (2006) The Grand Literary Cafes of Europe (New Holland Publishers (UK) Ltd, London) ISBN 9781845371142
- Knut Are Tvedt (ed.): Oslo byleksikon, Kunnskapsforlaget 2010, p. 156 (in Norwegian), ISBN 978-82-573-1760-7

== Related reading ==
- Peter Rosenkrantz Johnsen: Engebreth in "Folkebladet" (Magazine) No. 14. 31 July 1904. pages 210-213 (in Norwegian)
