= Laura Gundersen =

Norwegian actress (1832–1898)

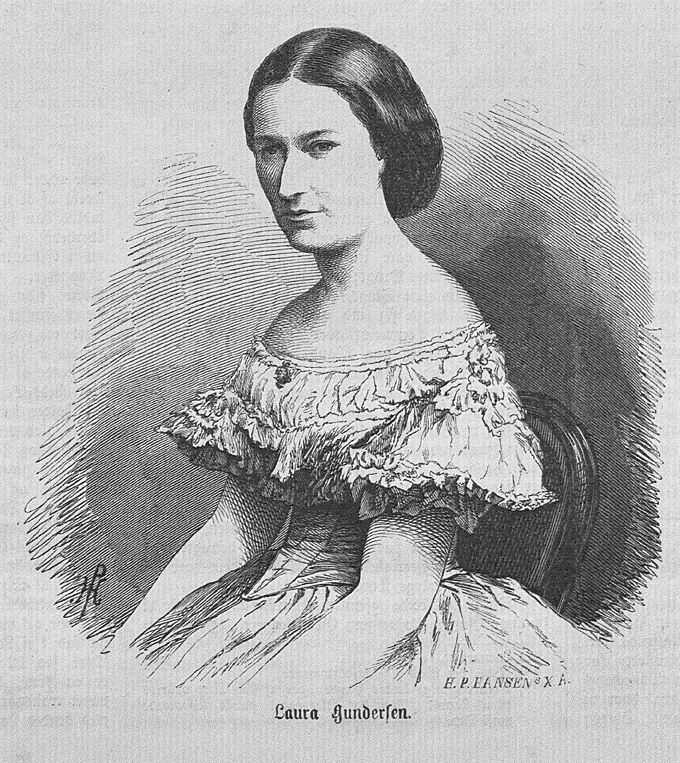
- Born: Laura Sofie Coucheron Svendsen; 27 May 1832; Bergen, Norway
- Died: 25 December 1898 (aged 66); Oslo, Norway
- Spouse: Sigvard Gundersen (m. 1864)

Laura Sofie Coucheron Gundersen (née Svendsen) (27 May 1832 – 25 December 1898) was a Norwegian actress, counted as the first native-born tragedienne, and also, in some aspect, as her country's first professional native actress and prima donna. She was associated with Christiania Theater from her debut in 1850 until her death, except for the seasons 1870-72, when she played at Møllergatens Theater.

== Biography ==
Laura Sofie Coucheron Svendsen was born in Bergen, Norway. Her parents were Jacob Buchmann Svendsen (1792–1840) and Beate Marie Coucheron (1799–1837). Both of her parents died while she was quite young. She had firm ambition to be an actor from her early years. In 1849, at the age of seventeen, she borrowed money from a relative and traveled to Christiania (now Oslo).

In 1849, Norwegian actors were not employed at the official theatres in Oslo; the greatest theater in the 1840s, the Christiania Theatre, was founded by Danes and the language of the stage was Danish. Norwegian actors were treated to smaller roles. The reason given was that the Norwegian actors lacked education, as there were no acting schools in Norway. That year, however, Laura Gundersen was employed as the first and only Norwegian actor to play at the Christiania Theatre in Oslo, and became as such historical. Dating from 1856, the Christiania Theatre committed to employ more native actors.

In 1864, she married actor Sigvard Gundersen (1842–1904). She starred as Svanhild, alongside her husband Sigvard as Falk, in the premiere of Henrik Ibsen's Love's Comedy at the Christiania Theatre in 1873. She played a long row of tragedies; one of the most famous was the premier of Bergljot, a melodrama with orchestra by Edvard Grieg in 1885. She also starred in Ibsen's and Bjørnson's contemporary dramas.

She played according to the Danish romantic tradition. Her employment was the start of a new age in the cultural history of Norway, and towards the end of the 19th century, Danish and foreign dominance were broken; from 1872, Norwegian was the language of the stage, and the Norwegian stage was taken over by Norwegian actors, who often favoured a more realistic way to play, a development that led to fewer parts for Gundersen in the end of the century.

She died in Oslo and is buried with her husband at Vår Frelsers gravlund.

== See also ==
- Louise Brun
- Emilie da Fonseca
- Augusta Smith

== Other Sources ==
- Meyer, Michael (1974) Ibsen: A Biography. Abridged edition. Pelican Biographies ser. Harmondsworth: Penguin. ISBN 0-14-021772-X
- Schmiesing, Ann (2006) Norway's Christiania Theatre, 1827-1867: from Danish showhouse to national stage (Fairleigh Dickinson Univ. Press) ISBN 0-8386-4107-5
