= Aker, Norway =

Former municipality in Akershus

Coordinates: 59°54′19.68″N 10°45′35.05″E

Aker was a former independent municipality in Akershus, Norway, that constitutes the vast majority of the territory of the modern city of Oslo.

The name originally belonged to a farm which was located near the current Old Aker Church. The church in turn became the source of the name of the parish and later municipality as well as Akershus Fortress, the main fief and main county of Akershus which included most of Eastern Norway until 1919, the smaller county of Akershus, and numerous institutions within this area.

The Aker municipality was in terms of population by far the largest municipality of Akershus county. It surrounded the capital city of Christiania (renamed Oslo in 1925) until 1948; Aker was 27 times larger than the capital it surrounded. In the late 19th century Aker ceded some of its territory to Christiania, and in 1948 Aker completely merged with the Oslo municipality to create the modern, vastly enlarged Oslo municipality. The merger was unpopular in Aker, which at the time was an affluent suburban community.

The Aker name remains in use in two districts of Oslo, Vestre Aker and Nordre Aker, which are only a small part of the former Aker municipality.

== History ==
Akers Herred had 6,375 inhabitants in 1769, and this number increased to 7,600 in 1801. Aker was established as a municipality on 1 January 1838 (see formannskapsdistrikt). It was subdivided in 1861 into Østre and Vestre Aker, and in 1906 was further subdivided into Ullern and Nordstrand. On 1 January 1948 Aker municipality was incorporated into the city of Oslo. The municipality had 135,000 inhabitants and included the residential areas of Ullern, Vestre Aker, Østre Aker and Nordstrand, as well as the outlying areas were all incorporated into Oslo.

Since the city of Christiania was founded in 1624, Aker had been the source of territory for expansion of the city. The first expansion came as early as 1629, when a number of farms were transferred into the Bymarken area of the city. Bymarken was the land that surrounded Christiania until the city expansion in 1859. Bymarken was a commons in which citizens could engage in agriculture to their own housekeeping, and provide summer and winter fodder for livestock. Bymarken lay under the city's civil administration, but for ecclesiastical purposes remained part of Aker's parish. Aker borders Bymarken on the west side of the Skillebekken, a former suburb of Oslo and on the east side, the river Akerselva. The entirety of Bymarken and portions of the Akerselva were incorporated into the city in 1859. Adjustments were made again in 1878 and Aker was finally fully incorporated into Oslo in 1948.

== The name ==
The municipality (originally the parish) is named after the old Aker farms (Store Aker and Lille Aker) (Old Norse: Akr), since the first church was built there (see Gamle Aker kirke). The name is identical with the word akr meaning 'field, acre'. Many fields were considered holy in Norse times, and several were dedicated to the old Norse gods – see for instance Torsåker, Ullensaker and Ringsaker.

== Notable residents ==
(Note that all residents are from when Aker was an independent city.)

- Jonas Axel Boeck (1833–1873), marine biologist specializing on northern amphipods and herring
- Andrine Christensen (1814–1853), actress and dancer
- Fredrik Hiorth (1851–1923), engineer and industrialist
- Marta Sandal (1878–1930), singer
- Thor Hiorth Schøyen (1885–1961), entomologist

== See also ==
- Aker Brygge
