= Vincent Abbadie =

French surgeon

Vincent Abbadie (born 25 May 1737 in Pujo, County of Bigorre; died 18 March 1814 in Châteauneuf-sur-Loire) was a French surgeon.

== Life ==
Vincent Abbadie began his medical career as a surgeon in several Bayonne hospitals, where he worked for several years and treated, among other things, soldiers from the local garrison. After passing several exams, he received the necessary diploma to practice his profession as a naval surgeon on the high seas for a while. He then went to Paris in 1763 for further training, attended medical lectures and was finally appointed surgeon at the Bicêtre Hospital in the southern Paris suburb of Le Kremlin- Bicêtre.

After his employment there ended, he became surgeon to Louis Jean Marie de Bourbon, Duke of Penthièvre. Through his work he received in 1768 the certificate of appointment as Surgeon General of the Navy.

Abbadie edited Précis des hernies ou desccentes (Nantes 1787) and translated the following treatises by David Macbride from English into French (Paris 1766):

- Sur la fermentation des mélanges alimentaires
- Sur la nature et les properties de l'air fixe
- Sur les vertus respectives de different antiseptiques
- Sur le scorbut
- Sur la vertu dissolvante de la chaux live
