= Martin Nürenbach =

German actor (died 1780)

- Born: unknown Germany
- Died: 1780; Tavastia, Sweden

Martin Nürenbach or Nurembach (unknown – 1780) was a German acrobat, stage actor, dancer and equilibrist active in Sweden, Norway and Finland. He was a pioneer in Norwegian theater history by founding the first public theater in Oslo in the year 1771.

== Life ==
=== Early career ===
The early life of Martin Nürenbach is sketchy. He was from Germany, but his year of birth is unknown. He likely came to Sweden in the travelling theater company of the German theater director Carl Seuerling, who arrived to Sweden in 1759, and are estimated to have been a child or a teenager at that time. Carl Seuerling married the Swedish actress Margareta Lindahl, and took over the travelling Swedish theater company of his father-in-law Peter Lindahl, thereby staying in Sweden.

Nürenbach later stated (1769) that he was the "stepson" of Carl Seuerling, but this statement is unclear and is familial relation to Seuerling is unconfirmed. If the identification of stepson is to be taken literarally, he could have been the son of Carl Seuerling's first wife Maria Heidensköld in her previous marriage, but this is unconfirmed. A woman by the name of Jacobina Nürembach is listed as a maid of the Seuerling theater company, and may have been a relative.

Martin Nürenbach is listed as a member of the Stenborg Company in a passport to Uppsala in 1767, and as a member of the Seuerling troupe in 1767–68. As a member of the theatre company, he performed rope- and wire-dancing and acrobatics, and identified himself as an equilibrist. He also participated in plays as an actor, though he had only moderate success in this field. As a member of the Stenborg and Seuerling theatre companies, he toured both Sweden and Finland, which was at that time a Swedish Province.

Nürenbach was active as a dance instructor and advertised extensively and offered dance lessons in the cities he passed on his tours, which was evidently an important side income. He was at one point active as the "city dancing master" in Gothenburg.

At some point, he married his colleague, the dancer Anna Katarina Rancke.

=== Norway ===
In July 1770, Martin Nürenbach made his debut as a dance teacher and performer in Oslo in Norway. From October 1771, he performed in companionship with the professional dancer and musician Christina Doreothea Stuart.

In the end of 1770, he had formed a small theatre company of Norwegian stage actors. In December 1771, Nürenbach was given royal permission upon application to perform theatre performances in Oslo, thus founding the first permanent theatre in a city where previously only travelling theatre companies or private amateur societies similar to Det Dramatiske Selskab had performed. Between December 1771 and February 1772, the theatre staged a number of theatrical pieces, pantomimes, dancing, and acrobatics by Norwegian artists, performing in Danish. According to advertisements, comedies by Holberg were performed mixed with dance performances. Not much is known of the activity of the Nürembach theatre. Martin Nürenbach himself was evidently an appreciated and popular dancer, but not considered as good in the capacity of an actor, and it seems as if the dance performances were more appreciated than the theater plays, which is why dance performances were mixed with the plays. Aside from Nürenbach himself, nothing is known about the members of his cast, other than that they were said to have been Norwegians performing in the Danish language. Nürenbach's wife Anna Katarina Rancke is not mentioned at all during their stay in Norway (though it is known that she was present) and it is unknown if she performed.

In February 1772, the theater of Martin Nürenbach was closed and he and his wife departed Norway for Sweden. Not long after, the Norwegian theater ban of 1738 was reintroduced in Norway, but he is noted to have closed his theater and left prior to this, of unknown causes. The theater of Martin Nürenbach was the first permanent theater in the history of Norway and was as such a pioneer institution for which Nürenbach is remembered, though it was not to last.

In 1780, it was succeeded by the private amateur theatre Det Dramatiske Selskap, but no new public professional theater was founded in Oslo until the Christiania Offentlige Theater was founded by Johan Peter Strömberg in 1827.

=== Late career ===
In September 1773, Martin Nürenbach, again a member of the Stenborg Company, is known to have performed as an acrobat in the Humlegårdsteatern in Stockholm, where he made such a success that the theater company had to expand the seats of their stage building in order to give room for the large number of spectators. It was as a dancer he was famed, and performed as such after every play, but he is noted to have performed as an actor in the role of Harlequin on the 8 October.

"Nürenbach with spouse" departed as members of the Stenborg theater company to Finland, where he bought the permit to stage theater in Finland from Petter Stenborg in companionship with the actor Beckman. From 1774 to 1780, Nürenbach-Beckman would have been the only travelling theater company active in Finland, but not much information is known of their activity. In 1781, Nürenbach's colleague Beckman returned to Stockholm where he sued Nürenbach for having broken their contract by abandoning him and taken all their actors with him: however, the court protocol simply stated that Nürenbach was "No longer present in the Kingdom."

Martin Nürenbach died in Tavastia in Finland in late 1780.
