= Bankplassen =

Square in Oslo, Norway

Coordinates: 59°54′32.1″N 10°44′29.5″E

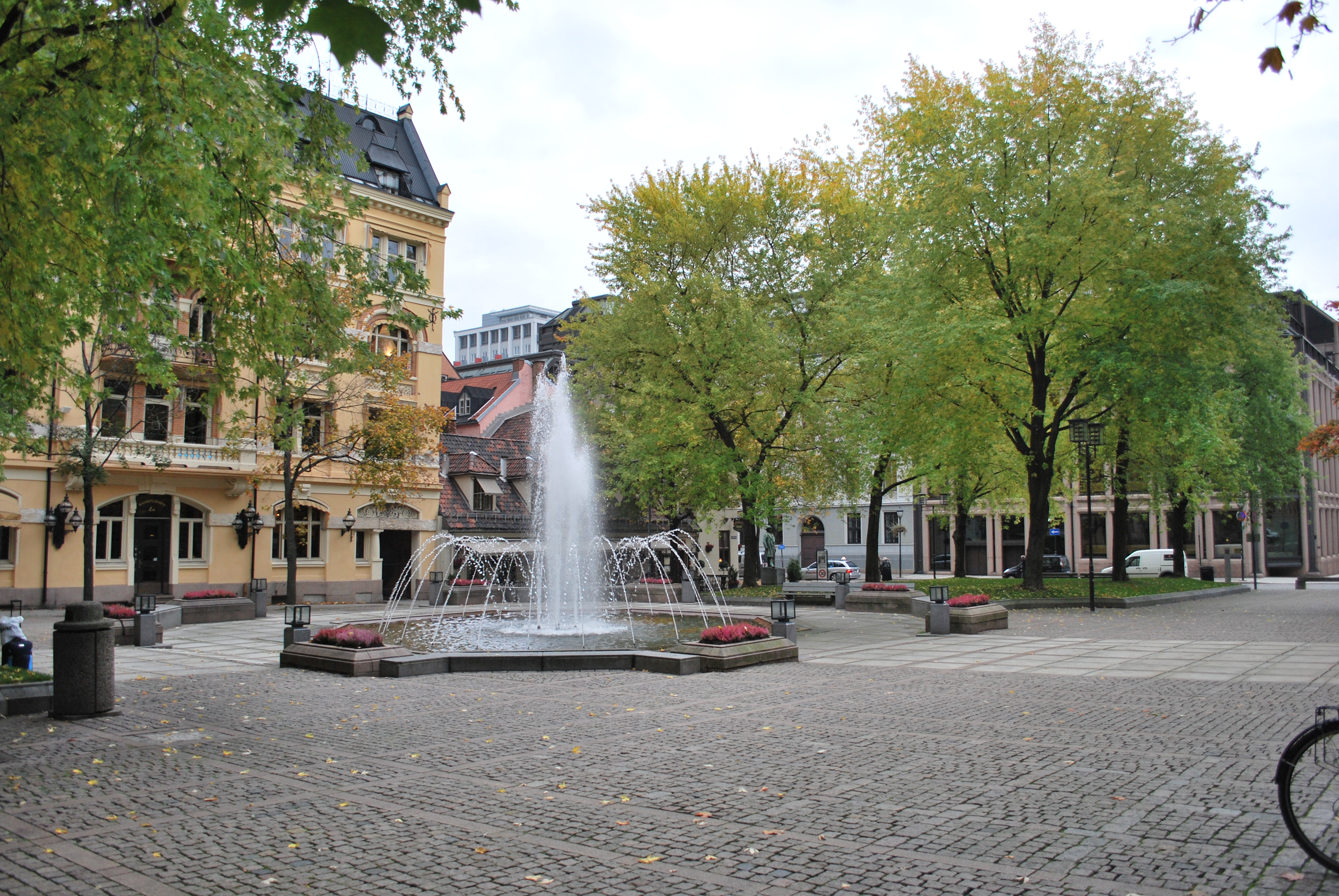
Bankplassen (Bank Square), Oslo. In the background, the Engebret Café.

Bankplassen ('The Bank Square') is a square in the neighborhood Kvadraturen in Oslo, bounded by Kongens gate, Myntgata and Kirkegata. Before 1953, Agnes Thorsens plass was also part of Bankplassen. The square takes its name after the building of the Christiania Department's Norges Bank located at 3 Bankplassen, built in 1830 as a division office after designs by architect Christian Heinrich Grosch. It is now used by the National Museum of Art, Architecture and Design. It received in 2008 an addition designed by architect Sverre Fehn.

When Norges Bank's headquarters was moved from Trondheim to Oslo, the Bank's new building at 4 Bankplassen was completed in 1906 after drawings by architect Ingvar Hjorth. On 1 September 1986, Norges Bank was then moved to a new continuous block building with address at 2 Bankplassen, designed by architects Kjell Lund and Nils Slaatto. Several older apartment buildings were then later integrated into the new building. Other well-known institutions on Bankplassen are the Engebret Cafè with address at 1 Bankplassen.
