= Christina Doreothea Stuart =

Norwegian entertainer

Christina Doreothea Stuart, known under her stage name Madame Stuart (died after 1774), was a dancer, equilibrist, singer and musician active in Norway. She played an important part in Norwegian cultural history; she is noted as a pioneer figure of ballet in Norway and connected to the activity of the first public theater in Norway. She is considered to be the first ballet dancer to perform in Oslo and Norway.

== Life ==
The background of Christina Doreothea Stuart is unknown. She was married to the famous British dancer and acrobat Michael Stuart in his third marriage, with whom she had several children. He was known in Denmark since 1756, and when he arrived in Oslo in Norway in 1769, Christina arrived with him as his wife as well as his dance partner.

=== Early career in Oslo ===
Stuart was not only a dancer, but also a singer and a musician. In a performance in Oslo on 26 January 1770, "The Great Virtuosis Madame Stuart" sang, played instrumental music, performed acrobatics and danced ballet, and in on 31 January 1771, "The wellfamous Madame Stuart" performed tight-rope-walking. The Stuart couple are counted as pioneers of Norwegian ballet, and the performance of Madame Stuart has been called as the possibly first ballet ever performed in Oslo. She became a popular and successful artist in Oslo, where there were no public theaters at the time and the only entertainment was offered by travelling artists passing through town. She held her performances in the city hall, hosted charity concerts to the benefit of the poor, and composed songs in the Danish language.

While her husband was admired for his skill as an artist, he was also notorious as a person because of his heavy drinking and fistfights. While she performed, Michael opened and managed an inn where he sold wine, beer and sweets. When he died in June 1771, she was left with several small children to support and was reportedly in a grim financial situation, selling beer and different types of goods and clothing, as well as giving lessons in dance and continuing with her stage performances.

=== Companionship with Nürenbach ===
From October 1771, she performed in companionship with the acrobat Martin Nürenbach from Sweden. On 7 October 1771, Stuart and Nürenbach performed ballet, acrobatics and tight-rope-walking. Stuart sang an aria, and on the last scene, they performed as actors together. Reportedly, the two demonstrated different kinds of positions and balancing, offering equilibrist feats: while Nürenbach twisted his body into different shapes and forms, Stuart balanced a peacock feather both horizontally and vertically, lost it, caught it again, and then played an minuet, probably on a lute.

In December 1771, Nürenbach founded the first public theater in Oslo, composed of a small theater staff of stage performers, of which he and Stuart where probably the only artists with previous professional training and experience. While the theater's activity is mostly unknown, Stuart was likely the actress acting with Nürenbach in the play Jomfru Pecunia by M. Nissen. In February 1772, the theater was evidently closed and Nürenbach left for Sweden.

=== Later life ===
Stuart herself left for Sweden in 1774, and she is known to have performed in Gothenburg in April 1774. She is not mentioned after this.

In 1783, a dancer by the name of Eleanore Stuart made her debut at the Royal Danish Theatre in Copenhagen; she may have been the daughter of Christina Doreothea Stuart.

== See also ==
- Augusta Smith
- Det Dramatiske Selskab
