= Great fire of Tirschenreuth =

1814 fire in Germany

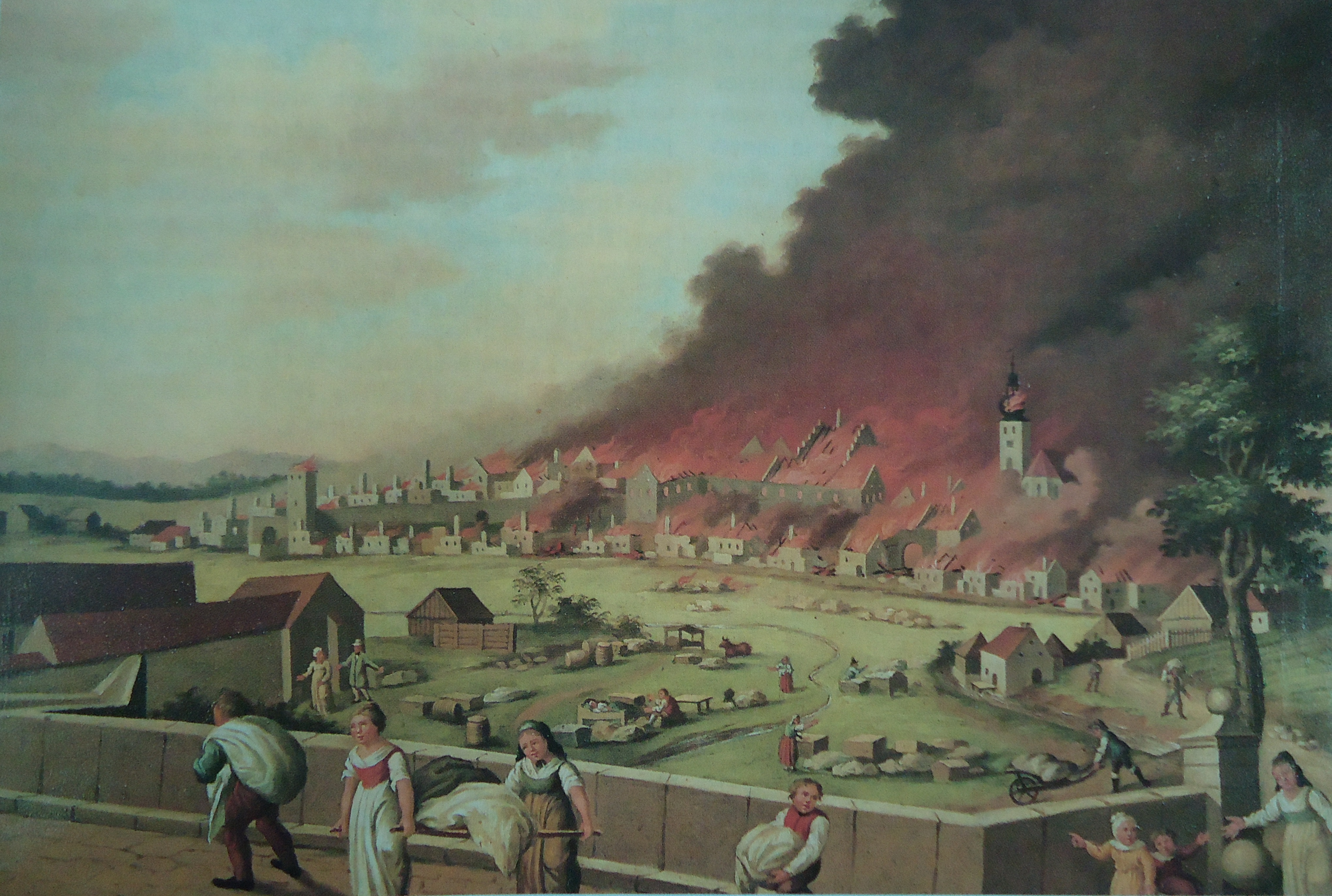
- Tirschenreuth July 1814
- Date: 30 July 1814
- Location: Tirschenreuth, Kingdom of Bavaria
- Type: Fire
- Property damage: 907 buildings destroyed

The Great fire of Tirschenreuth took place on 30 July 1814 and destroyed nearly all of Tirschenreuth, a small town and regional centre in the east of Bavaria, close to the frontier with Bohemia. The great fire was the greatest catastrophe in the town's history apart from the invasion by Swedish troops that took place in the context of the Thirty Years' War two centuries earlier.

== Events ==
The fire was discovered between 9 and 10 in the morning in the storage barn of a toy maker called Joseph Scherbaum. The cause of the fire is unclear, although the toy maker's wife was spotted heating her oven in the morning and it is possible that sparks from this action somehow ignited the surrounding building which went up in flames very quickly. Rising smoke was spotted from the church tower by the town's two watchmen. They immediately sounded the fire bell and hung a banner from the church tower pointing towards the direction from which the smoke was coming. Within a short time fire spread from the blacksmith's house to the nearby properties. With just a few fire buckets and a small pump there was no realistic prospect of stopping the fire, and people concentrated on rescuing their families, livestock and living necessities, and moving these to the safety of the meadow by the Fish Hall, no longer on an island, but set on parkland which until a drainage project undertaken in 1808 had been a huge pond. After the fire had raged for four hours the town was almost entirely destroyed. An exception was the priest's house and three small neighbouring houses. Half of the Church of the Ascension of the Virgin Mary also survived, but the timber interior of the tower was burned out. Outside the town the Fish Hall also survived.

A total of 907 buildings were destroyed by the fire, made up of 307 houses and 600 sheds or other outbuildings. Rapid spreading of the fire had been exacerbated by the narrowness of the streets the through closeness of the buildings to one another, squeezed between the town wall on one side and the remains of two large recently drained bodies of water on two other sides.

== Aftermath ==
The years following the fire were years of hunger. Tirschenreuth was rebuilt, but the outcome differed significantly from what had been there before. The gable frontages that had been a feature of the houses round the market place were omitted, and the town hall was also rebuilt without its old gables and roof window towers. The town's old castle was not rebuilt at all.

On 28 January 1819 the town was able to celebrate its rebuilding. The total amount collected across Bavaria to support the project had been around 42,000 guilders, including 1,000 guilders from the king, who also donated approximately 12,000 tree trunks from the Royal forests to be used for the reconstruction.
