= Det Dramatiske Selskab =

Norwegian amateur theatre drama troupes

Det Dramatiske Selskab is the name for several Norwegian amateur theatre drama troupes. These troupes were the first permanent theatre troupes in the cities of Norway. The period between 1780–1830 is described by many as the age of the dramatic companies.

== History ==
The amateur theatre companies of Det Dramatiske Selskap founded the first theatres and gave the first regular performances in Norwegian cities. Previously, Norway was visited by travelling foreign troupes which performed in temporary structures. However, the theatres run by the amateur troupes of Det Dramatiske Selskap were not public theatres, but private.

=== Det Dramatiske Selskab in Christiania (Oslo) ===
An amateur theatre performed in the city is recorded in 1765. Founded in Oslo in 1780, it gave the first regular theatre performances in Norway. On 24 October 1780, they performed The coffeehouse or the Scottish woman by Voltaire translated by Ditlevine Feddersen starring Henriette Mathiesen (Lindane) and Envold Falsen (Frelon).

They performed first in Gevæxthuset, a concert house from the 1760s by Grændsehaven and, from 1802, in Dramatiken, beside the Centralteatret

They replaced the temporary theatre staged by Martin Nürenbach in the city 1771–1772, and was in turn replaced by the theatre of Johan Peter Strömberg in 1827, the Christiania Offentlige Theater, which was the origin of the first Norwegian national theatre, Christiania Theatre.

=== Det Dramatiske Selskab in Christianssand ===
Founded in 1787 by Henrik Arnold Thaulow, Nicolai Emanuel de Thygeson, and Nicolai Wergeland (father of Henrik Wergeland and Camilla Collett).

Their first theatre burned down in 1892, and the second was torn down in 1966. It is now counted as the first amateur theatre in Norway, and is located at Agder Theater.

=== Det Dramatiske Selskab in Bergen ===
Established in 1794 alongside Det Harmoniske Selskab (founded in 1765), it soon became more independent of it and popular.

From 1800 it had its own theatre building, Komediehuset på Engen, until 1828; this theatre was later to be the first public theatre in Bergen, when it, after Det Dramatiske Selskap had left in 1828, became the first travelling professional Danish theatre troupe, and, in 1850, it came to Den Nationale Scene, the first public theatre in Bergen. The building was burnt after the bombardment of 15 June 1940.

=== Det Dramatiske Selskab in Arendal ===
The Dramatic company of Arendal was founded in 1796 and performed in Comediehuset of Arendal, a building that it owns. They are still active.

=== Det Dramatiske Selskab in Drammen ===
Founded in 1801.

=== Det Forenede Dramatiske Selskab in Trondheim ===
Founded in 1802 and performed in their own theatre building from 1816. In 1861, they gave the use of their theatre house to the first permanent theatre of the city, the Throndhjems Theater.

=== Det Dramatiske Selskab in Laurvig ===
Founded in 1810.

=== Det Dramatiske Selskab in Fredrikshald ===
Founded in 1819.

=== Det Dramatiske Selskab in Stavanger ===
Founded in 1823.

=== Det Dramatiske Selskab in Egersund ===
Founded in 1825.

=== Det Dramatiske Selskab in Christiansund ===
Founded in 1830.

=== Det Dramatiske Selskab in Tromsø ===
Founded in 1832.

=== Det Dramatiske Selskab in Hammerfest ===
Founded in 1839.
