= Christiania Theatre =

Theatre in Norway (1836–1899)

Coordinates: 59°54′32″N 10°44′29″E

Christiania theatre
- Christiania Danish Theatre
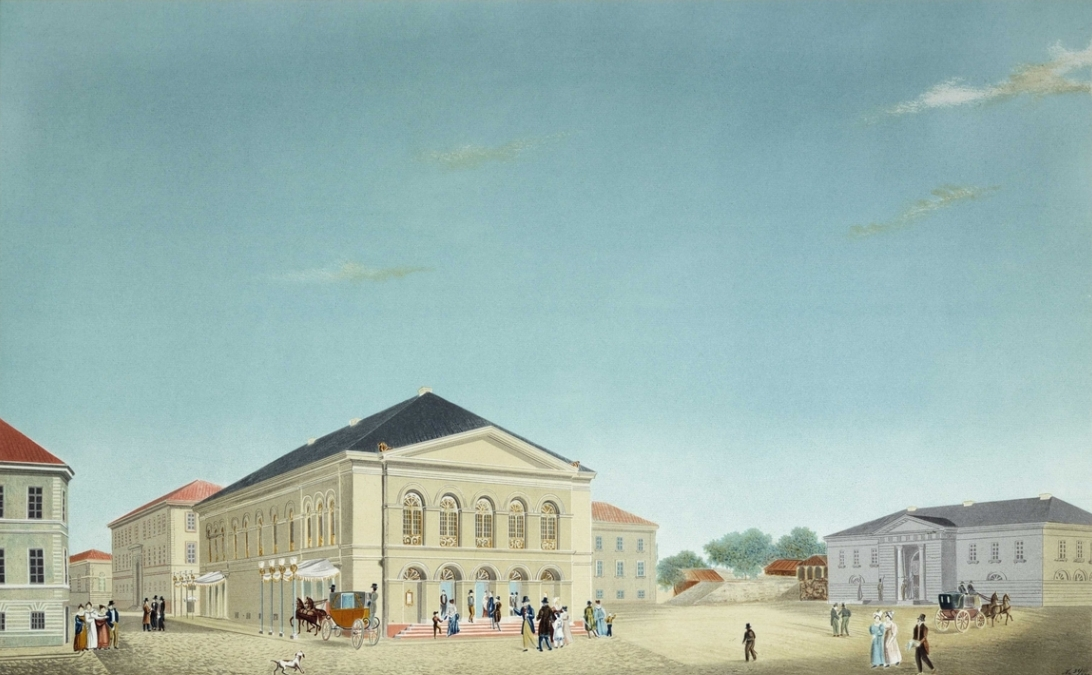
- Christiania Theatre in the 19th century, gouache by architect Christian H. Grosch.
- Interactive map of Christiania theatre
- Address: Christiania; Norway

Construction
- Opened: 4 October 1836
- Closed: 1 September 1899

Christiania Theatre, or Kristiania Theatre, was Norway's finest stage for spoken drama from 4 October 1836 (opening date) to 1 September 1899. It was located at Bankplassen by the Akershus Fortress, in central Christiania. It was the first lasting public theatre in Norway and the national stage of Norway and Oslo during the 19th century.

== History ==
Christiania Theatre was the first long-term public theatre in Oslo. In November 1771 and February 1772, Martin Nürenbach made an unsuccessful attempt to start the first public theatre in Oslo. Aside from this, theatre was performed only by the private amateur society Det Dramatiske Selskap at the Gevaexthuset concert hall, which did not offer public performances, and by travelling foreign theatre companies.

The first public theatre, the Christiania Offentlige Theater, was inaugurated by the Swedish theatre director Johan Peter Strömberg, in January 1827. This was to be the predecessor and origin of the Christiania Theatre. After the building burnt down on 5 November 1835, it was reinstated with the name Christiania Theatre in October 1837.

Over next few years, an avid debate developed with strong criticism of the Danish dominancy of the arts. Christiania Theatre only employed Danish actors during its early period, for which it was criticized. The reason given was that there was not an acting school in Norway and that the Norwegian actors were therefore not good enough. The Norwegian language conflict often centered on Norwegian writers who gradually adopted distinctly Norwegian vocabulary in their work. Henrik Wergeland may have been the first to do so. Art critic Johan Sebastian Welhaven was one of the conservatives who took out against the theories of the extreme nationalists. The Danish troupe was eventually mixed up with Norwegian actors after the employment of Norwegian actress and prima donna Laura Gundersen, in 1849.

The foundation of the first Norwegian theatre in Oslo, Christiania Norwegian Theatre, in 1852, was but a temporary rival, as it was forced to close down in 1862. The theatre was created as a counterpoint to the Danish language-dominated Christiania Theatre. Henrik Ibsen was artistic director of the Christiania Norwegian Theatre from the autumn of 1857 and served as the leading director until its bankruptcy in 1862.

From 1856, the Christiania Theatre promised to employ native actors. In 1872, Norwegian became the stage language. Ibsen's famous play Peer Gynt premiered here in 1876 as well as a large number of important Norwegian productions, including several by Norway's other national bard at the time, Bjørnstjerne Bjørnson. During the continued run of Peer Gynt, a fire started on the performing night of 15 January 1877, heavily damaging the theatre; luckily, this was later repaired. Christiania Theatre was seen as Norway's national stage for drama until the Nationaltheatret was opened on 1 September 1899, with Bjorn Bjornson as theatre director and including a large part of the ensemble from the Christiania Theatre.
