= Christiania Offentlige Theater =

Former theatre in Oslo, Norway

Christiania Offentlige Theater ('Christiania Public Theatre') or Det Strømbergske Teater ('Strömberg Theatre') was a historic theatre in Oslo in Norway, active between 1827 and 1835. It was a pioneer institution, and plays an important part in Norwegian cultural history, as the first public theatre in Oslo and in Norway, and the predecessor of the Christiania Theatre.

== History ==
=== Background ===
The theatre was founded by the Swedish theatre director Johan Peter Strömberg. With the exception of the unsuccessful attempt of Martin Nürenbach in 1772, there was no public theatre in Oslo or anywhere in Norway prior to 1827. Theatre was performed by foreign travelling theatre companies, or privately by Det Dramatiske Selskab.

Strömberg wished to establish a professional public theatre in Norway, with professional native actors. He obtained a theater permit from the Danish crown, and founded the first dramatic school in 1825 in order to train the first group of native actors.

=== Activity ===
On 30 January 1827, the theatre was inaugurated with a performance of Strömberg's students, the pioneer group of Norwegian actors. However, the Norwegian actors was not considered trained enough to meet the standards of the audience, and Strömberg was forced to engage trained actors from Denmark.

On 4 November 1827, Strömberg performed his play Fredsfesten in praise of the unpopular Swedish-Norwegian Union, which attracted great criticism. In the spring of 1828, Strömberg was declared bankrupt, rented the theatre and the theatre permit to one of his Danish actors, Jens Lang Bøcher, and returned to Sweden. Jens Lang Bøcher replaced almost all of the Norwegian staff with Danes, allowing only five Norwegians to remain. On 22 June 1832, Strömberg sold the theatre to the director Carl Anton Saabye, after which it was renamed to Christiania Offentlige Theater.

The first opera performed in public in Norway, Deux mots by Nicolas Dalayrac, was performed here in 1831, directed by August Schrumpf with Augusta Smith in the main role.

The theatre burned down on 5 November 1835, after which the theatre company performed in the house of the Det Dramatiske Selskab until the Christiania Theatre was inaugurated on 4 October 1837.
