= Johan Peter Strömberg =

Swedish stage actor, dancer and theatre director

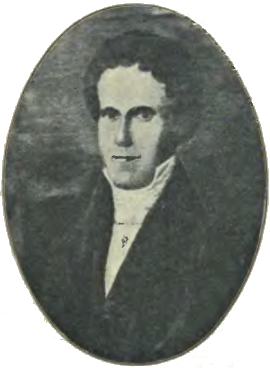
- Born: 19 August 1776; Stockholm, Sweden
- Died: 20 September 1834 (aged 61); Aker, United Kingdoms of Sweden and Norway (now part of Oslo, Norway)
- Spouse: Maria Christina Ehrnström

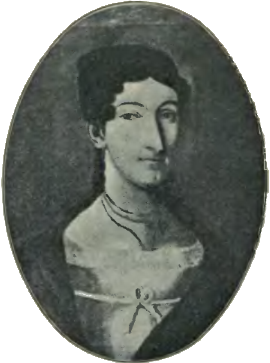
Maria Christina Sophia Ehrnström

Johan Peter Strömberg (19 August 1776 – 20 September 1834) was a Swedish stage actor, dancer and theatre director. He was the founder of the first public theatre and acting school in Oslo, Norway.

== Biography ==
Johan Peter Strömberg was born in Stockholm to tobacco manufacturer Anders Olofsson Strömberg and Ulrica Sophia Bourchell. In 1797, he married the Swedish dancer Maria Christina Sophia Ehrnström (1776–1853).

=== Stage career ===
Johan Peter Strömberg made his debut in the travelling theater company of E. M. Wederborg at Nyköping in 1793. He toured Sweden as a member of several travelling theatre companies, such as the ones of Carl Seuerling, Johan Peter Lewenhagen, A. O. Hofflund and Johan Anton Lindqvist.

In 1798-99 he attempted to start a permanent theater in Uddevalla, and in 1800, he made another attempt to start a permanent theater in Nyköping, but was forced to close in 1802.

During this epoch, Swedish language theater companies toured also in Norway, where there were otherwise only private amateur theatres of the Det Dramatiske Selskap. From 1803 onward, he and his spouse were active in Norway both as performers and as instructors of dance and acting in several Norwegian cities. They acted as instructors in Trondheim 1803-04 and 1805, at Kristiansund in 1804-05, and at the Det Dramatiske Selskab in Oslo.

=== Christiania Offentlige Theater ===
In 1809, he was given permission to create a public theater in the Norwegian capital. His wish was to create a Norwegian theater with Norwegian actors. In 1825, he founded Det Strømbergske Teater, an acting school as preparation for the theater. In 1827, Christiania Offentlige Theater was inaugurated in Oslo. This was the first professional public theater in Norway since the short lived theater of German acrobat stage actor, Martin Nürenbach over fifty years prior. The theater was however not to be successful. Johan Peter Strömberg was forced to hire Danish actors because there where no Norwegian professionals and his Norwegian students where criticized for not being educated enough. When he performed the Swedish play Fredsfesten on 4 November 1827, a play which praised the Union of Sweden and Norway, the theater was boycotted. He subsequently when bankrupt and was forced to close the theater in 1828. He died in poverty during 1834 in Aker. The building burned in 1835.

However, his pioneer project was to have a lasting effect as his theater was to become the Christiania Theatre in 1836. This became the first lasting permanent public theater in Norway.

== Other sources ==
- Næss, Trine (2004). "Johan Peter Strömberg". In Helle, Knut (ed.). Norsk biografisk leksikon (in Norwegian). Vol. 8.
- dans i Kristiania på 1700- og 1800-talet
