= List of Norwegian operatic sopranos =

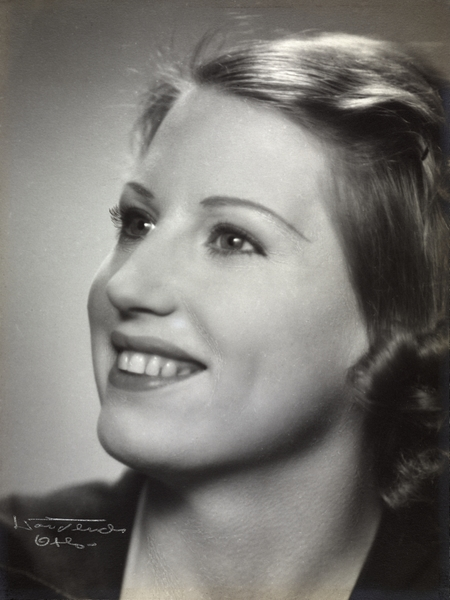
Karen-Marie Flagstad (circa 1935)

This is a list of operatic sopranos and mezzo-sopranos who were born in Norway or whose work is closely associated with that country.

== A ==
- Signe Amundsen (1899–1987), soprano in Milan's La Scala, the Opéra-Comique in Paris and at the National Theatre, Oslo
- Bodil Arnesen (born 1967), soprano performing in operas and concerts in Europe, USA and Asia
- Beate Asserson (1913–2000), mezzo-soprano, performed in the opera houses of Germany, Austria, Italy and France

== B ==
- Ingrid Bjoner (1927–2006), soprano noted for roles in the operas of Wagner and Richard Strauss, international concert soloist and recital performer
- Anne Brown (1912–2009), American-born Norwegian soprano, active in Broadway musicals, later concert singer and recitalist in Europe

== D ==
- Lise Davidsen (born 1987), dramatic operatic soprano, international concert singer and recitalist

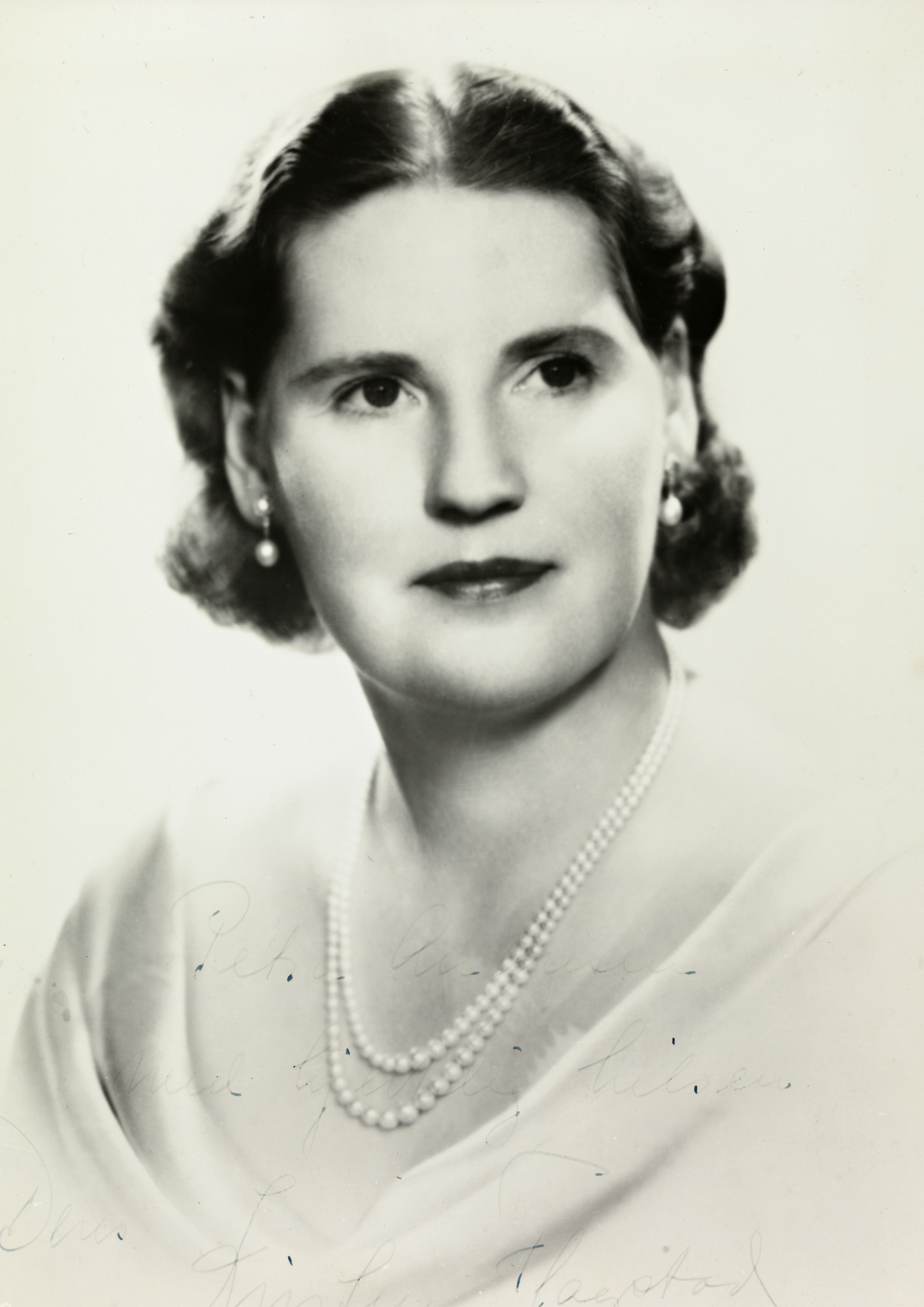
Kirsten Flagstad

== E ==
- Mari Eriksmoen (born 1983), operatic soprano who since 2006 has performed across Europe

== F ==
- Karen-Marie Flagstad (1904–1992), soprano, performed in operas in Oslo and across Europe
- Kirsten Flagstad (1895–1962), outstanding Wagnerian soprano, Metropolitan Opera, Covent Garden, Bayreuth
- Emilie da Fonseca (1803–1884), Norwegian-Danish actress and opera singer
- Kari Frisell (1922–2022), soprano with the Norwegian National Opera until 1971, later voice teacher

== G ==
- Lona Gyldenkrone (1848–1934), soprano, performed in operas and concerts in Scandinavia, Germany and Russia

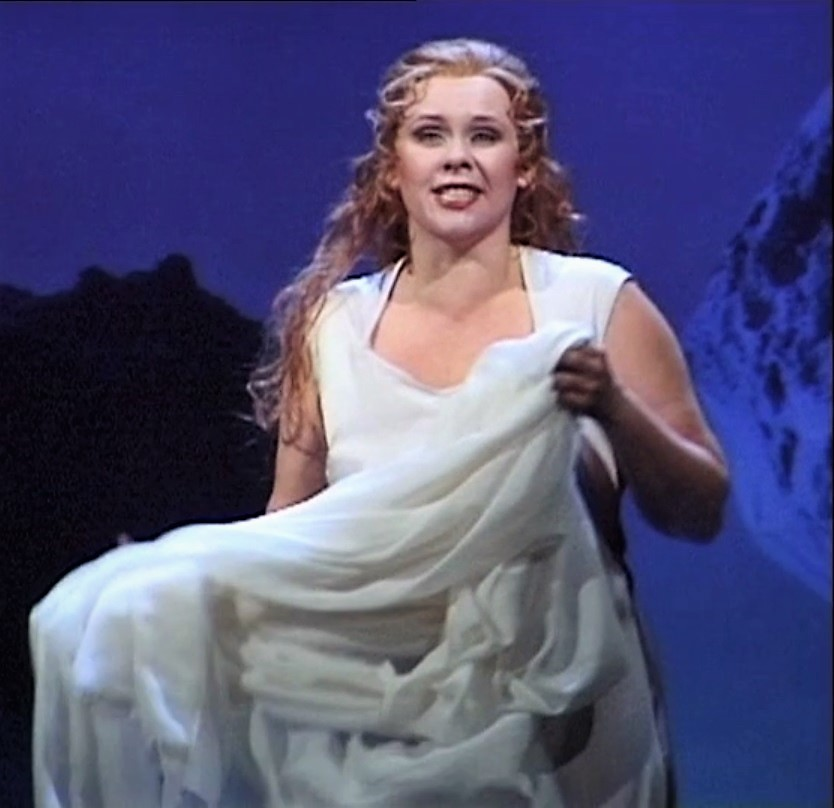
Solveig Kringelbotn in 2017

== H ==
- Haldis Halvorsen (1889–1936), operatic mezzo-soprano performing in Scandinavia and Germany
- Randi Heide Steen (1909–1990), soprano, performed in operettas and concerts in Oslo
- Wilhelmine Holmboe-Schenström (1842–1938), mezzo-soprano concert performer and opera singer appearing in Scandinavia, Germany, France and Italy

== K ==
- Turid Karlsen (born 1961), soprano, performed mainly in Karlsruhe and Bonn but also in North America
- Solveig Kringlebotn (born 1963), soprano, performed in concerts and recitals across Europe and in operas in New York and Paris
- Lilleba Lund Kvandal (1940–2016), soprano, appeared in opera houses and concert halls in Germany

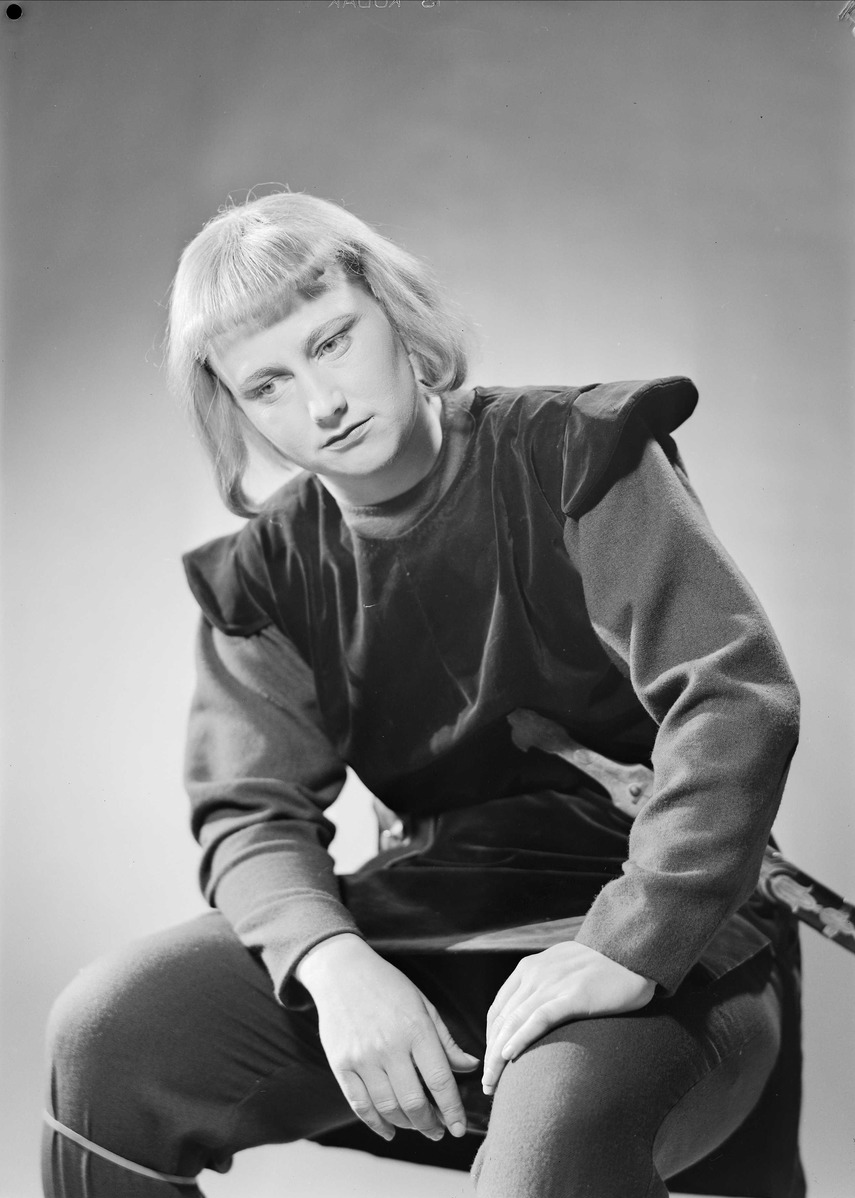
Aase Nordmo Løvberg in 1952

== L ==
- Borghild Langaard (1883–1939), soprano in concerts of Grieg's songs and operas in Oslo and London
- Aase Nordmo Løvberg (1923–2013), leading operatic soprano active at the Royal Swedish Opera and as a guest in Vienna, New York and London

== M ==
- Ann-Helen Moen (born 1969), lyric soprano, performances in operas and concerts in Norway, Austria, Germany and Switzerland

== N ==
- Elizabeth Norberg-Schulz (born 1959), Norwegian-Italian soprano and concert soloist, appearances in many of the world's leading opera houses
- Eidé Norena (1884–1968), soprano active at La Scala, Royal Opera House and Metropolitan Opera, noted for Italian roles

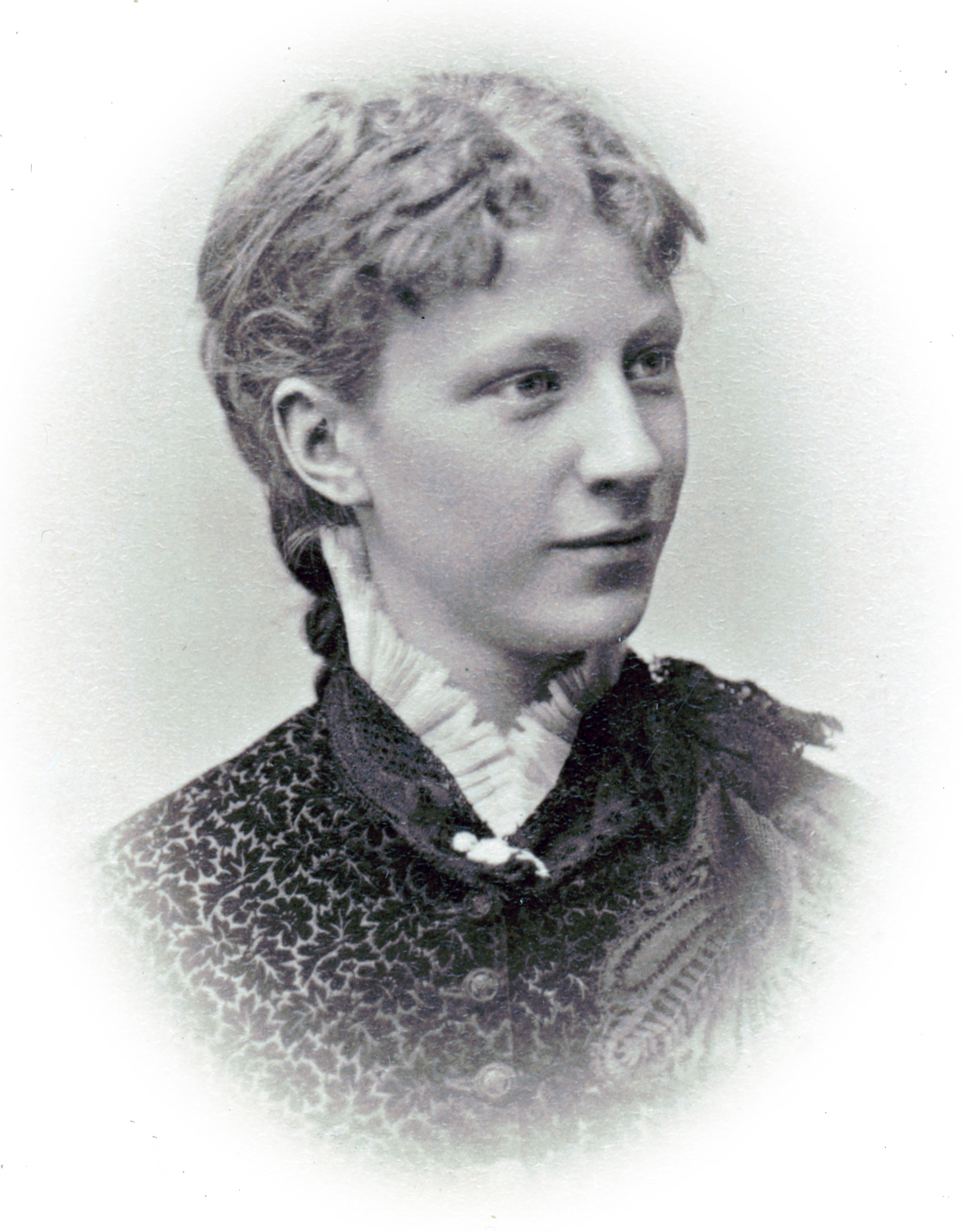
Gina Oselio (1880)

== O ==
- Gina Oselio (1858–1937), mezzo-soprano remembered for her Carmen role at the Royal Swedish Opera

== P ==
- Eva Prytz (1917–1987), soprano with the Royal Swedish Opera until 1967, also concert soloist

== S ==
- Soffi Schønning (1895–1994), soprano active with the Royal Swedish Opera and in Oslo theatres, concert performer in London
- Tuva Semmingsen (born 1975), opera singer, has performed both mezzo-soprano and coloratura roles, soloist with the Royal Danish Theatre
- Marita Solberg (born 1976), active in opera in Stuttgart, Barcelona, Madrid and Berlin
- Torhild Staahlen (1947–2021), mezzo-soprano with the Norwegian National Opera, also performed in opera and concerts in Germany, the UK and USA

== V ==
- Anna Kriebel Vanzo (1881–1926), performed mainly in Italy
- Ingrid Vetlesen (born 1981), soloist performing at the Royal Danish Opera and in concerts and operas in Norway

== W ==
- Camilla Wiese (1845–1938), mezzo-soprano singer and voice teacher, performed at the Royal Swedish Opera as well as in Bergen and Oslo, also a recitalist
