= Artôt =

Artôt is a surname. Notable people with this name include:

- Désirée Artôt (1835–1907), opera singer
- Jean Désiré Artôt (1803–1887), Belgian horn player
- Alexandre Artôt (1815–1845), Belgian violinist
- Lola Artôt de Padilla (1876–1933), French soprano
