= Désirée Artôt =

Belgian soprano

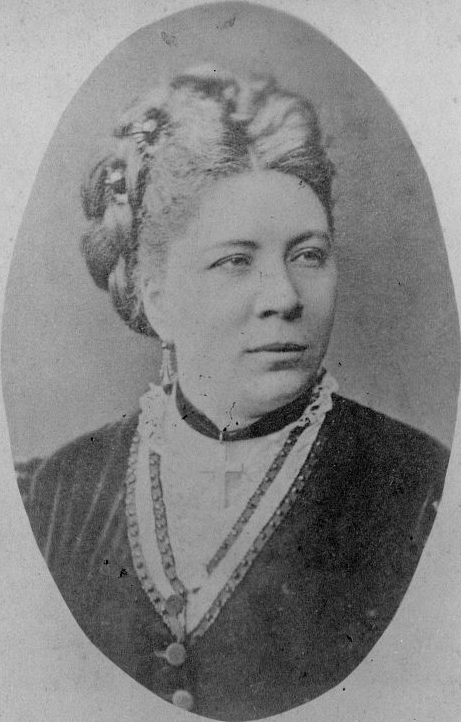
- Born: July 21, 1835; Paris, Kingdom of France
- Died: April 3, 1907 (aged 71)
- Spouse: Mariano Padilla y Ramos

Désirée Artôt (French: [deziʁe aʁto]; 21 July 1835 – 3 April 1907) was a Belgian soprano (initially a mezzo-soprano), who was famed in German and Italian opera and sang mainly in Germany. In 1868 she was engaged, briefly, to Pyotr Ilyich Tchaikovsky, who may have coded her name into works such as his First Piano Concerto and the Romeo and Juliet Fantasy-Overture. After her 1869 marriage to the Spanish baritone Mariano Padilla y Ramos, she was known as Désirée Artôt de Padilla or Désirée Artôt-Padilla.

== Biography ==
=== Family background ===
Marguerite-Joséphine-Désirée Montagney Artôt was the daughter of Jean Désiré Montagney Artôt, a horn player at La Monnaie in Brussels and professor at the Brussels Conservatory. Her uncle was the violinist Alexandre Artôt (1815–1845). He had been born Alexandre Joseph (or Joseph-Alexandre) Montagney, but adopted the surname Artôt professionally, and the rest of his family followed suit. Another uncle was the Belgian portrait painter Charles Baugniet (1814–1886).

=== Early career ===
She studied with Pauline Viardot and Francesco Lamperti in London and Paris. She appeared in concerts in Belgium, the Netherlands and on 19 June 1857 at a State Concert in England. Giacomo Meyerbeer engaged her for the Paris Opéra, where she made her debut on 5 February 1858 as Fidès in his Le prophète, to great success. She also sang the title role in a condensed version of Gounod's Sapho. Hector Berlioz and others praised her singing in the Journal des Débats on 17 February. However, she abandoned the French repertoire and went to sing in Italy in 1859. She also sang in Berlin that year, at the opening of the Victoria Theatre with Lorini's Italian company. She was highly successful in The Barber of Seville, La Cenerentola, Il trovatore and other roles there.

Artôt sang in London in 1859-60 and again in 1863 (at Her Majesty's Theatre), in La fille du régiment, La traviata, and Norma (as Adalgisa, with Thérèse Tietjens in the title role). In 1861, she was briefly engaged to the Welsh harpist John Thomas.

... Her favourite part was "The Daughter of the Regiment," for which opera, in order to be quite realistic, she had studied the side-drum for some months, and used to play it herself in the first act as efficiently as any professional drummer.

She returned to England in 1864, where she sang at Covent Garden, and 1866, in Gounod's Faust and other roles.

=== Russia and Tchaikovsky ===
In 1868 she visited Russia with a touring Italian company that also include Roberto Stagno. She captivated Moscow: at a reception for her at the home of Maria Begicheva, the hostess knelt before Artôt and kissed her hand. (Maria Begicheva was the wife of the repertory director of the Moscow state theatres, and the mother, from her first marriage, of one of Pyotr Ilyich Tchaikovsky's future lovers, Vladimir Shilovsky.)

Désirée Artôt met Tchaikovsky briefly at a party at the Begichevs in the spring. He also visited her after her benefit performance, for which he wrote additional recitatives for a production of Daniel Auber's opera Le domino noir. They again met by chance at a musical party, where she expressed her surprise that he had not visited her more often during the autumn. He promised he would do so, but he did not intend to keep his promise, however Anton Rubinstein persuaded him to see her at the opera. She then started to send him invitations every day, and he became accustomed to visiting her every evening. He later described her to his brother Modest as possessing "exquisite gesture, grace of movement, and artistic poise". He had put aside his work on his symphonic poem Fatum in order to give her all his attention. It seems plausible that Tchaikovsky was more captivated in her as a singer and actor than as a romantic interest, and had difficulty in separating the artist from the person. Tchaikovsky dedicated his Romance in F minor for piano, Op. 5, to Artôt.

By the end of the year, marriage was being considered. It has been said that this was Tchaikovsky's first serious attempt to conquer his homosexuality. Her mother, who was travelling with her, opposed the marriage. There were three reasons for this: a certain unnamed Armenian man who sat in the front seat at all Artôt's performances, and was in love with her himself, told her mother lies about Tchaikovsky's background and his financial status which, being a stranger to Russian customs, she had no reason to disbelieve; then there was Tchaikovsky's age - he was five years Artôt's junior; and finally, she may have heard rumours about Tchaikovsky's sexual practices. Tchaikovsky's father, in contrast, supported his son's plans. Artôt herself was not prepared to abandon her career to support a struggling composer, and neither was Tchaikovsky prepared to become merely a prima donna's husband. Some of Tchaikovsky's friends, such as Nikolai Rubinstein, advised him against the marriage because being the husband of a foreign singing celebrity would mean he would have to forgo his own musical career. The matter was left undecided, and no formal announcement was made, but they planned to meet again in the summer of 1869 at her estate near Paris to finalise the question of their marriage. Then the opera company left to continue its tour in Warsaw. By the beginning of 1869, however, Tchaikovsky was having second thoughts. He wrote to his brother Anatoly that it was doubtful the marriage would ever take place. He wrote "... this affair is beginning to fall apart somewhat".

Although she did not communicate this fact to Tchaikovsky, as the social conventions of the time would have demanded, Artôt also changed her mind. (One source claims it was her singing teacher Pauline Viardot who persuaded Artôt not to marry Tchaikovsky.) On 15 September 1869, either in Sèvres or Warsaw, Artôt married a member of her company, the Spanish baritone Mariano Padilla y Ramos. Padilla was seven years her junior, and he was someone she had previously ridiculed to Tchaikovsky. Nikolai Rubinstein was advised of the marriage by telegram, and he went to inform Tchaikovsky straight away. He was in the midst of a rehearsal for his opera The Voyevoda, and when he heard Rubinstein's news, he became quite upset, abandoned the rehearsal, and left immediately.

Tchaikovsky got over the affair fairly quickly. When writing his Piano Concerto No. 1 in B-flat minor in 1874, he included in the slow movement the tune of a popular French song Il faut s’amuser et rire, which Artôt had in her repertoire. The flute solo that starts the movement may also be a reference to her. The second subject of the first movement starts with the notes D flat–A (in German Des–A), which the musicologist David Brown argues is a musical cipher on Artôt's name, Désirée Artôt. The use of initials spelled out in musical pitches is a device often used by Robert Schumann (for example, in his Carnaval), and Tchaikovsky was a great admirer of Schumann's music. The sequence D flat–A is naturally resolved by a B flat, which, according to Brown, determined the overall key of the entire concerto, B flat minor, a very unusual key for a concerto or symphony. The famous opening theme of the first movement is written in the relative major key, D flat major (Des), and after being played twice, it never reappears (perhaps an echo of Artôt's sudden disappearance from his life). The theme is introduced by a descending minor key gesture (F–D flat–C–B flat) on the horns, which might be a reference to Artôt's father, a professor of horn, but is more likely a reference to the composer himself: he used the sequence E–C–B–A as his own signature in other works, and the horn gesture is E–C–B–A transposed from A minor to B flat minor. There are other suggestions that Tchaikovsky coded his own name into the concerto, and Artôt's name into the symphonic poem Fatum, the Symphony No. 3, and the Romeo and Juliet Fantasy-Overture. He never revealed the program of Fatum, and later even destroyed the score (although it was reconstructed from the orchestral parts and published posthumously as Op. 77).

The Artôt episode was very fresh in Tchaikovsky's mind at the time he wrote Romeo and Juliet. He could easily have drawn a parallel between his personal loss and the tragedy of Shakespeare's drama. Mily Balakirev praised Romeo and Juliet's love theme (written in D flat = Des) with an extraordinary choice of words: "... the second D flat tune is delightful ... It is full of tenderness and the sweetness of love ... When I play it I imagine you are lying naked in your bath and that the Artôt-Padilla herself is washing your stomach with hot lather from scented soap". It was Balakirev who had first suggested Tchaikovsky write a Romeo and Juliet piece, in May 1869 (or August). The work (in its first version) was completed on 29 November 1869, just two months after Artôt's marriage to Padilla.

On her December 1870 Moscow visit, Tchaikovsky went to hear her as Marguerite in Gounod's Faust. He was reported to have had tears streaming down his cheeks (although he was often moved to tears by music); they did not meet on this occasion. In 1875 she was again in Moscow, singing in Meyerbeer's Les Huguenots. Calling on Nikolai Rubinstein one day at the Conservatorium, Tchaikovsky and his friend Nikolay Kashkin were asked to wait because "a foreign lady" was with Rubinstein in his office. The foreign lady soon emerged, and it turned out to be Désirée Artôt. Both she and Tchaikovsky were so flustered that they exchanged no words, and she left hurriedly. Tchaikovsky burst out laughing, saying "And I thought I was in love with her!".

In December 1887, she had a chance encounter with Tchaikovsky in Berlin, at a performance of Berlioz's Grande Messe des morts, and they were glad to renew their acquaintance, but there was no mention of past events. On 4 February 1888, Artôt met Tchaikovsky again in Berlin. Tchaikovsky spent a part of each of the five days he had there with her, and spent an evening with her on 7 February at 17 Landgrafstrasse, during which she asked him to write a romance for her. He wrote in his diary: "This evening is counted among the most agreeable recollections of my sojourn in Berlin. The personality and the art of this singer are as irresistibly bewitching as ever". In May he wrote to her, promising the song by August. During the summer, the composer's time was taken up with various major works, including the Hamlet overture-fantasia, which was completed on 19 October. By now, he had decided to write not one song for Artôt, but six, keeping in mind the present range of her voice. He chose untranslated French texts by three poets. The Six French Songs, Op. 65, were finished on 22 October, and the set was dedicated to Désirée Artôt-Padilla. He concluded his 29 October letter to her with the hope that she would like them and "... one is a little intimidated when one is composing for a singer one considers the greatest among the great".

=== Later career ===
After Artôt's marriage to Mariano Padilla y Ramos, she was often known as Désirée Artôt de Padilla or Désirée Artôt-Padilla. Artôt appeared with Padilla in Italian opera in Germany, Austria, Poland, Sweden, Belgium, the Netherlands, Denmark, Russia, and Finland. She appeared in Moscow in 1868-70 and again in 1875-76, and in Saint Petersburg in 1871–72 and 1876–77. She had a tempestuous temperament and her onstage battles with Minnie Hauk in Moscow in the 1870s are well documented.

Artôt retired in 1884, but on 22 March 1887 she and Padilla appeared in a scene from Don Giovanni in a celebration of the Emperor's birthday at the Imperial Palace in Berlin; it was also the centenary year of Don Giovanni. She became a singing teacher in Berlin until 1889, before moving to Paris. Her students included the contralto Rosa Olitzka, Elisa Kutscherra de Nyss Marie Goetze, and Berglioth Prom. She died in 1907 in Paris (or Berlin), just four months after her husband died.

Artôt's and Padilla's daughter Lola Artôt de Padilla had a highly successful career as an operatic soprano, creating Vreli in Delius's A Village Romeo and Juliet.
