= The Tempest (Tchaikovsky) =

Symphonic poem in F minor by Pyotr Ilyich Tchaikovsky

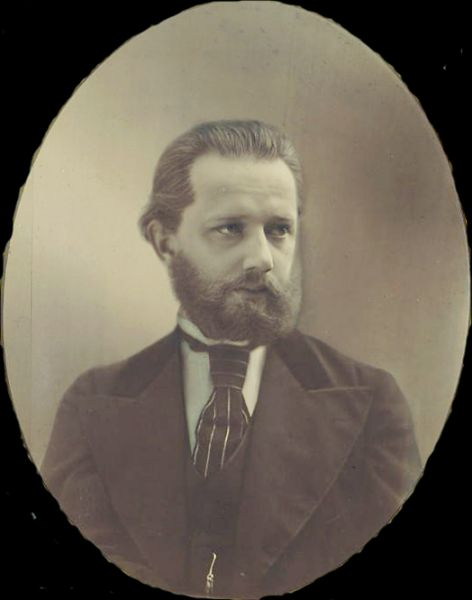
Pyotr Ilyich Tchaikovsky ca. 1875

The Tempest (Russian: Буря Burya), Symphonic Fantasia after Shakespeare, Op. 18, is a symphonic poem in F minor by Pyotr Ilyich Tchaikovsky composed in 1873. It was premiered in December 1873, conducted by Nikolai Rubinstein.

It is based on the play The Tempest by William Shakespeare. Similar in structure to Tchaikovsky's better-known Romeo and Juliet fantasy-overture, it contains themes depicting the stillness of the ship at sea, the grotesque nature of Caliban, and the love between Ferdinand and Miranda. The love music is particularly strong, being reminiscent of the love music from Romeo and Juliet.

Tchaikovsky was much influenced by Shakespeare: in addition to Romeo and Juliet and The Tempest, he also wrote a Hamlet overture-fantasy (1888) and incidental music to Hamlet (1891).

Excerpts from the score were used in the 2005 ballet Anna Karenina, choreographed by Boris Eifman.

== Instrumentation ==
Piccolo, 2 Flutes, 2 Oboes, 2 Clarinets (B♭), 2 Bassoons + 4 Horns (F), 2 Trumpets (F), 3 Trombones, Tuba + Timpani, Cymbals, Bass Drum + Violins I, Violins II, Violas, Cellos, Double Basses
