= Berglioth Prom =

Norwegian actress, singer, and voice teacher

- Born: December 18, 1858; Bergen, Norway
- Died: October 19, 1934 (aged 75); Oslo, Norway
- Occupation(s): Actress, singer
- Mother: Helene Wiese
- Relatives: Ellen Prom

Berglioth Prom (first name also spelled Bergljot or Bergliot, December 18, 1858 – October 19, 1934) was a Norwegian actress, singer, and voice teacher.

Berglioth Prom was born in Bergen, the daughter of the actor Jacob Prom (1831–1865) and the singer Helene Wiese (1828–1862). She was the half-sister of the actress Ellen Prom, and she grew up at the home of her aunt Eugenie Wiese and her husband, the businessman Peder Rosenkilde, in Stavanger. She married Thomas Fearnley (1851–1917), the director of the Gjensidige insurance company, at Trinity Church in Kristiania (now Oslo) on December 7, 1887.

Prom studied voice for several years in Germany under the voice teacher Désirée Artôt. When she returned to Norway in 1884, she began teaching voice in her home town of Bergen.

Prom debuted on October 20, 1886, at the Christiania Theatre in the role of Inga in Bjørnstjerne Bjørnson's play Mellem Slagene (Between the Battles).

== Selected roles ==
- Inga in Mellem Slagene (Between the Battles) by Bjørnstjerne Bjørnson (Christiania Theatre, 1886)
- Preciosa in Preciosa by Carl Maria von Weber and Pius Alexander Wolff (Christiania Theater, 1886)
- Edith in the farce Der Bibliothekar (The Librarian) by Gustav von Moser (Christiania Theater, 1886)

== Additional reading ==
- Jensson, Liv (1981). Biografisk skuespillerleksikon. Oslo: Universitetsforlaget. p. 137. ISBN 8200056228.
