= Ellen Prom =

Norwegian actress (1865–1925)

- Born: October 19, 1865; Bergen, Norway
- Died: 1925
- Occupation(s): Actress, singer
- Mother: Karen Marie Fougner
- Relatives: Berglioth Prom, Kitty Wentzel

Ellen Jacoba Prom (October 19, 1865 – 1925) was a Norwegian actress. Prom was born in Bergen, the daughter of the actor Jacob Prom (1831–1865) and the actress Karen Marie Fougner. She was the half-sister of the journalist, actress, sculptor, and writer Kitty Wentzel and the actress Berglioth Prom. In the 1890s she toured the United States as an actress, with performances in Fitchburg, Massachusetts, St. Louis, Boston, Chicago, New Orleans, Nashville, and San Francisco.

After returning from the United States, she made her Norwegian debut on November 22, 1896, at the National Theater in her home town of Bergen in the role of Elisabeth Munk in the play Elves' Hill by Johan Ludvig Heiberg. She was engaged with that theater until December 31, 1898, when she left Bergen. Although she was married to the actor Bernhard Hansen (1879–1945), she traveled from Kristiania (now Oslo) and Paris to Japan because that summer she had fallen in love with Masahiro Matsusaki (1870–?), who was serving as the Japanese commissioner in Bergen.

== Selected roles ==
- Elisabeth Munk in Elves' Hill by Johan Ludvig Heiberg (National Theater, 1896)
- Lars Dintfass in The Fidget by Ludvig Holberg (National Theater, 1898)
- Julie in Faddergaven (The Christening Gift) by Peter Egge (National Theater, 1898)
