= Romeo and Juliet (Tchaikovsky) =

Orchestral work by Pyotr Ilyich Tchaikovsky

Romeo and Juliet, TH 42, ČW 39, is an orchestral work composed by Pyotr Ilyich Tchaikovsky. It is styled an Overture-Fantasy, and is based on Shakespeare's play of the same name. Like other composers such as Berlioz and Prokofiev, Tchaikovsky was deeply inspired by Shakespeare and wrote works based on The Tempest and Hamlet as well.

Unlike Tchaikovsky's other major compositions, Romeo and Juliet does not have an opus number. It has been given the alternative catalogue designations TH 42 and ČW 39.

== Musical structure ==
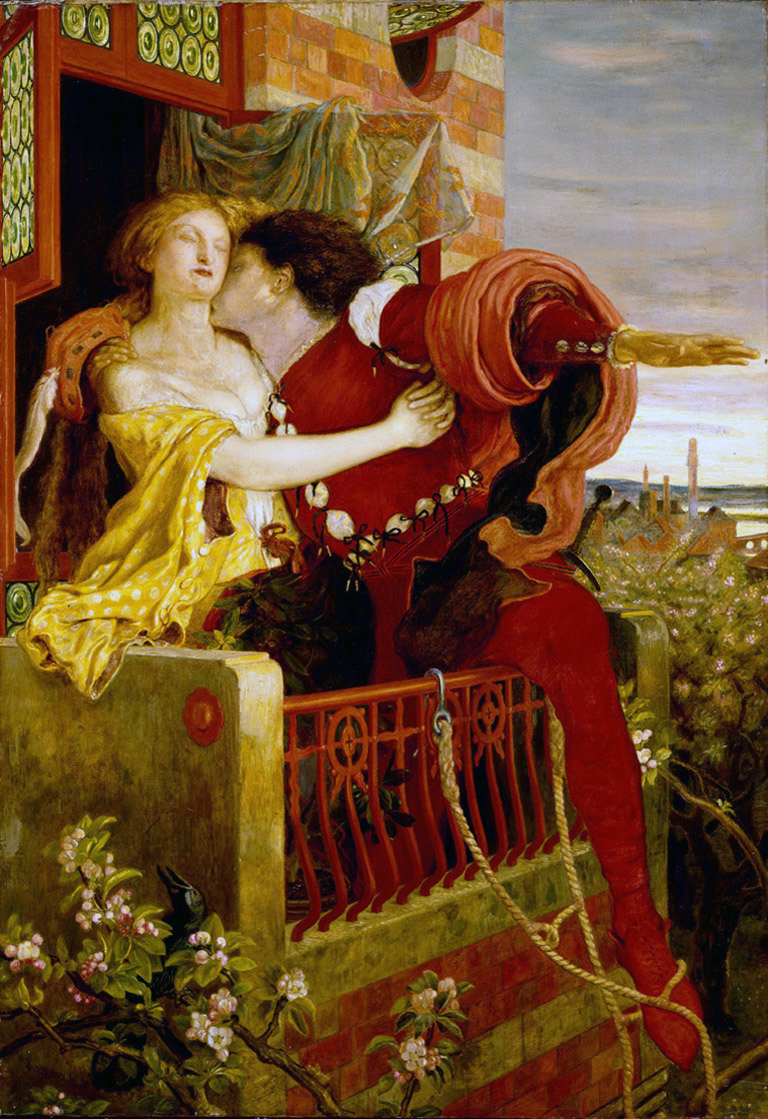
An 1870 oil painting by Ford Madox Brown depicting Romeo and Juliet's famous balcony scene

Although styled an 'Overture-Fantasy' by the composer, the overall design is a symphonic poem in sonata form with an introduction and an epilogue. The work is based on three main strands of the Shakespeare story. The first strand, written in F♯ minor, following Mily Balakirev's suggestion, is the introduction representing the saintly Friar Laurence. Here there is a foreboding of doom from the lower strings. The Friar Laurence theme is heard in F♯ minor, with plucked strings, before ending up in E minor. The introduction is chorale-like.

Eventually a single first inversion B minor chord that is passed back and forth between strings and woodwinds grows into the second strand in B minor, the strife theme of the warring Capulets and Montagues, including a reference to the sword fight, depicted by crashing cymbals. There are agitated, quick sixteenth notes. The action suddenly slows, the key changing from B minor to D♭ (as suggested by Balakirev) and we hear the opening bars of the "love theme", the third strand, passionate and yearning in character but always with an underlying current of anxiety. The love theme signifies the couple first meeting and the scene at Juliet's balcony. The English horn and viola represent Romeo, while the flutes represent Juliet.

The strife theme

In the development, the battling strand returns, this time with more intensity and build-up, with the Friar Laurence theme heard with agitation in F♯ minor. This section is then repeated again, a semitone higher. Eventually, a fortissimo is reached where the trumpets play an altered Friar Laurence theme with the rest of the orchestra having an off-beat gesture, in B minor. This leads into the recapitulation where the strife theme returns.

A transition is heard where the clarinets play an altered love theme over restless violin phrases, before the strings enter with a lush, hovering melody over which the flute and oboe eventually soar with the love theme once again, this time loud and in D major, signaling their consummated marriage, and finally heard in E major. It is interrupted by two large orchestra hits with cymbal crashes, which symbolise the families' war disrupting their love, and eventually bringing their deaths, with hate prevailing over love. A final battle theme is played, then a soft, slow dirge in B major ensues, with timpani playing a repeated triplet pattern, and tuba holding a B natural for 16 bars. The woodwinds play a sweet homage to the lovers, and a final allusion to the love theme brings in the climax, beginning with a huge crescendo B natural roll of the timpani, and the orchestra plays homophonic shouts of a B major chord before the final bar, with full orchestra belting out a powerful B natural to close the overture.

== Composition ==
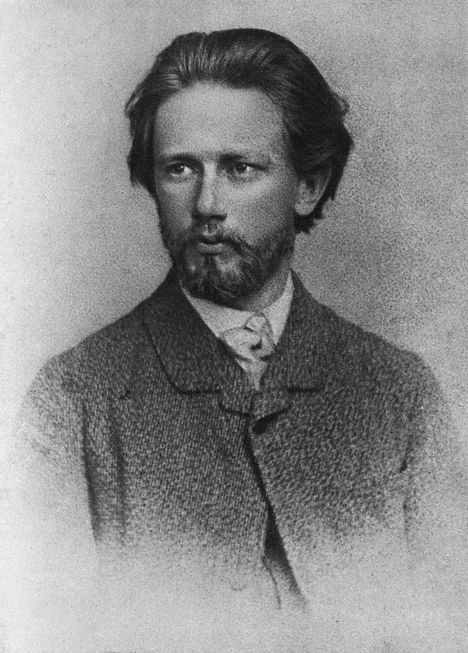
Tchaikovsky at the time he wrote Romeo and Juliet

=== Tense relationship ===
In 1869 Tchaikovsky was a 28-year-old professor at the Moscow Conservatory. Having written his first symphony and an opera, he next composed a symphonic poem entitled Fatum. Initially pleased with the piece when Nikolai Rubinstein conducted it in Moscow, Tchaikovsky dedicated it to Balakirev and sent it to him to conduct in St. Petersburg. Fatum received a lukewarm reception. Balakirev wrote a detailed letter to Tchaikovsky explaining the defects, but also giving some encouragement:

Your Fatum has been performed [in St. Petersburg] reasonably well ... There wasn't much applause, probably because of the appalling cacophony at the end of the piece, which I don't like at all. It is not properly gestated, and seems to have been written in a very slapdash manner. The seams show, as does all your clumsy stitching. Above all, the form itself just does not work. The whole thing is completely uncoordinated.... I am writing to you with complete frankness, being fully convinced that you won't go back on your intention of dedicating Fatum to me. Your dedication is precious to me as a sign of your sympathy towards me—and I feel a great weakness for you.

M. Balakirev—who sincerely loves you.

Tchaikovsky was too self-critical not to see the truth behind Balakirev's comments. He accepted Balakirev's criticism, and the two continued to correspond. (Tchaikovsky later destroyed the score of Fatum. The score was reconstructed posthumously from the orchestral parts.) Balakirev remained suspicious of anyone with a formal conservatory training but clearly recognized Tchaikovsky's great talents. Tchaikovsky liked and admired Balakirev. However, as he told his brother Anatoly, "I never feel quite at home with him. I particularly don't like the narrowness of his musical views and the sharpness of his tone."

Balakirev suggested Tchaikovsky write a piece based on William Shakespeare's Romeo and Juliet. Tchaikovsky was having difficulties writing an opera entitled Undine, which he eventually destroyed. Though he complained, "I'm completely burned out," Balakirev persisted, as was his manner. Balakirev wrote suggestions about the structure of Romeo and Juliet, giving details of the type of music required in each section, and even opinions on which keys to use.

Tchaikovsky grew to love the play and wrote in a letter to Nadezhda von Meck "Do you not think that this great work of the arch-genius is well adapted to inspire a musician?" Additionally, he wrote in a letter to his brother two days later:

I want to laugh when I realize how could I not have known until now that I am somewhat destined to set that drama to music; there is nothing more suitable for my character. There are no kings, no marches (...) There is love, love, love (...) Romeo and Juliet change from children who relish the love into loving, suffering people caught in a tragic and hopeless situation...

Balakirev had suggested his own overture King Lear as a model for Romeo—a prudent move, since he had seen Tchaikovsky's weakness in writing in an unstructured musical form in Fatum. King Lear is not a symphonic poem in the manner of Liszt. It is a tragic overture in sonata form along the line of Beethoven's overtures, relying more on the dramatic potential of sonata form rather than on a literary program. Thus, Balakirev had transformed King Lear into an instrumental drama and now offered it as a model to Tchaikovsky. While basing Romeo and Juliet on King Lear was Balakirev's suggestion, reducing the plot of the former to one central conflict and then combining it with the binary structure of sonata form was Tchaikovsky's idea. However, executing that plot in the music we know today came only after two radical revisions.

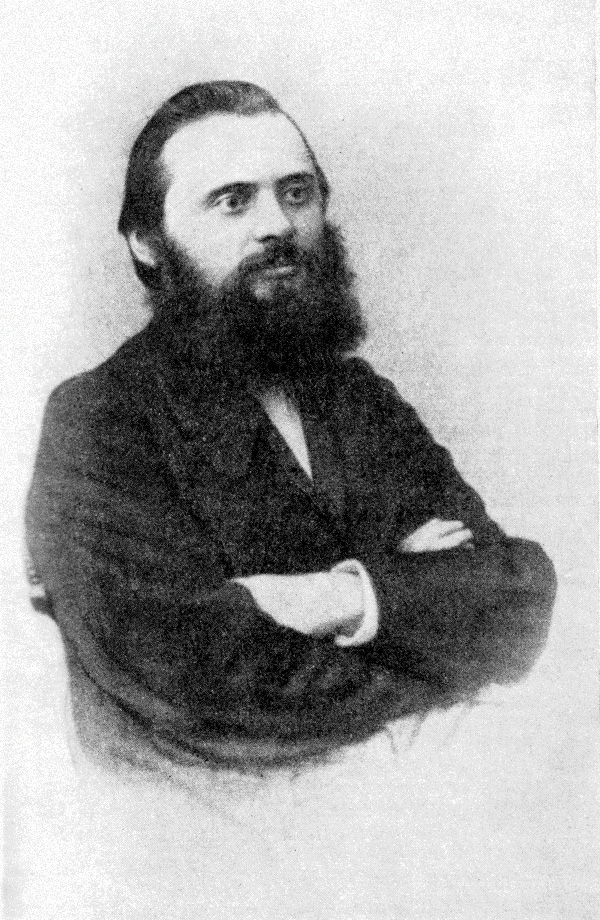
Mily Balakirev around the time Tchaikovsky met him.

=== First version ===
In the first version of Romeo and Juliet, the development section contained an opening fugato and a confrontation of the two themes—exactly what an academically trained composer might be expected to produce. While Balakirev responded to the love theme by writing Tchaikovsky, "I play it often, and I want very much to hug you for it", he also discarded many of the early drafts Tchaikovsky sent him—the opening, for instance, sounded more like a Haydn quartet than the Liszt chorale he had suggested initially—and the piece was constantly in the mail between Moscow and St. Petersburg, going to Tchaikovsky or Balakirev.

Tchaikovsky accepted some, but not all, of Balakirev's nagging, and completed the work, dedicating it to Balakirev. The first performance on March 16, 1870, was hindered by a sensational court case surrounding the conductor, Tchaikovsky's friend Nikolai Rubinstein, and a female student. The court had found against the eminent musician the previous day, and this incited a noisy demonstration in his favour when he appeared on the concert platform, which proved much more interesting to the audience than the new overture. The result was not encouraging as a premiere for Romeo and Juliet. Tchaikovsky said of the premiere:

"After the concert we dined.... No one said a single word to me about the overture the whole evening. And yet I yearned so for appreciation and kindness."

=== Second version ===
The initial failure of Romeo and Juliet induced Tchaikovsky to fully accept Balakirev's criticisms and rework the piece. It also forced Tchaikovsky to reach beyond his musical training and rewrite much of the music into the form it is known today. This included the choice of leaving the love theme out of the development section, saving its confrontation with the first theme (the conflict of the Capulets and Montagues) for the second half of the recapitulation. In the exposition, the love theme remains shielded from the violence of the first theme. In the recapitulation the first theme strongly influences the love theme and ultimately destroys it. By following this pattern, Tchaikovsky shifts the true musical conflict from the development section to the recapitulation, where it climaxes in dramatic catastrophe.

Meanwhile, Rubinstein had become impressed with Tchaikovsky's compositional talents in general and with Romeo and Juliet in particular. He arranged for the publishing house Bote and Bock to publish the piece in 1870. This was considered an accomplishment since Tchaikovsky's music was virtually unknown in Germany at the time. Balakirev thought Tchaikovsky was rushing Romeo and Juliet to press prematurely. "It is a pity that you, or rather Rubinstein, should have rushed the publication of the Overture," he wrote to the composer. "Although the new introduction is a decided improvement, there were other changes I had wanted you to make. I had hoped that for the sake of your future compositions, this one would remain in your hands somewhat longer." Balakirev closed by hoping that P. Jurgenson would sometime agree to bring out a "revised and improved version of the Overture." The second version was premiered in St. Petersburg on February 17, 1872, under Eduard Nápravník.

=== Third and final version ===
Tchaikovsky - Romeo and Juliet Overture
The final version of the Romeo and Juliet Overture, performed by Antal Dorati and the London Symphony Orchestra

In 1880, ten years after his first reworking of the piece, Tchaikovsky rewrote the ending and gave the piece the sub-title "Overture-Fantasia". It was completed by September 10, 1880, but did not receive its premiere until May 1, 1886, in Tbilisi, Georgia (then part of the Russian Empire), under Mikhail Ippolitov-Ivanov.

This third and final version is the one that is now in the repertoire. The earlier versions are performed occasionally as historical curiosities.

The third version is scored for an orchestra comprising piccolo, 2 flutes, 2 oboes, English horn, 2 clarinets (in A), 2 bassoons + 4 horns (in F), 2 trumpets (in E), 3 trombones, tuba + timpani, cymbals, bass drum + harp, violins I, violins II, violas, cellos, and double basses.

== Reception ==
At first Romeo and Juliet was not successful in Russia and Europe. It was received lukewarmly at its world premiere in March 1870. The work was hissed when Hans Richter conducted it in Vienna in November 1876; critic Eduard Hanslick excoriated the piece afterwards. The Paris premiere two weeks later, at the Concerts Populaires under Jules Pasdeloup, went no better. According to Tchaikovsky's colleague and friend Sergei Taneyev, who attended the Paris performance, Romeo's lack of success there may have been due to Pasdeloup's failure to understand the music. Despite this, several Parisian composers and musicians, including Camille Saint-Saëns, appreciated the piece.

One group that appreciated Romeo at once was the kuchka ("The Five"). Balakirev, now having the full score, wrote of their enthusiastic response and 'how delighted everyone is with your D♭ bit [the love theme]—including Vladimir Stasov, who says: "There were five of you: now there are six!" The beginning and end are as strongly censured'—and, Balakirev added, needed rewriting. Still, such was the enthusiasm of the kuchka for Romeo that Balakirev was asked to play it every time they met. Eventually, he learned to play the piece from memory as a result of fulfilling their requests.

== In popular culture ==
The Overture's love theme has been influentially used in many television series and movies such as Moonraker, Columbo, The Jazz Singer (1927), Wayne's World, Animaniacs, Taz-Mania, Tiny Toon Adventures, Scrubs, Seeing Double, The Simpsons, South Park, Clueless, A Christmas Story, The Fresh Prince of Bel-Air, SpongeBob SquarePants, Pushing Daisies, Sesame Street, El Chavo, The Three Musketeers, and The Ren & Stimpy Show, among others.

Different variations of the love theme were also played in the original The Sims video game, when two Sims successfully performed the "Kiss" interaction. How "powerful" the theme was depended on how compatible, or how in love, the interacting Sims were with each other.

Along with another Tchaikovsky piece, Dance of the Reed Flutes from the ballet The Nutcracker, the Romeo and Juliet love theme was sampled at the same time to the song "Love, so Lovely" for the direct-to-video Disney film Mickey, Donald, Goofy: The Three Musketeers.

Excerpts from the score were used in the 2005 ballet Anna Karenina, choreographed by Boris Eifman.

The main theme of the overture to Romeo and Juliet was adapted in 1939 by bandleader Larry Clinton as popular song "Our Love" (lyrics by Buddy Bernier and Bob Emmerich) and recorded by Clinton and by Jimmy Dorsey.

Composer Walter Murphy arranged a disco version of the Overture-Fantasy on his 1979 album Walter Murphy's Discosymphony.

Excerpts of the overture were played for the fireworks at the opening of APEC China 2014 held in Beijing before the leaders of the Asia-Pacific Economic Cooperation.

== Bibliography ==
- Brown, David, Tchaikovsky: The Early Years, 1840–1874 (New York: W.W. Norton & Company, 1978). ISBN 0-393-07535-2.
- Brown, David, Tchaikovsky: The Crisis Years, 1874–1878 (New York: W.W. Norton & Company, 1983). ISBN 0-393-01707-9.
- Holden, Anthony, Tchaikovsky: A Biography (New York: Random House, 1995). ISBN 0-679-42006-1.
- Kamien, Roger. Music : An Appreciation. Mcgraw-Hill College; 3rd edition (August 1, 1997) ISBN 0-07-036521-0
- Maes, Francis, tr. Arnold J. Pomerans and Erica Pomerans, A History of Russian Music: From Kamarinskaya to Babi Yar (Berkeley, Los Angeles and London: University of Calilfornia Press, 2002). ISBN 0-520-21815-9.
- Milos Zatkalik, Milena Medic, and Denis Collins. 2013. Histories and Narratives of Music Analysis. Newcastle Upon Tyne, Uk: Cambridge Scholars Publishing.
- Weinstock, Herbert, Tchaikovsky (New York: Alfred A. Knopf, 1944). ISBN n/a
