= Helene Wiese =

Norwegian actress and singer (1828–1862)

- Born: April 9, 1828; Bergen, Norway
- Died: July 3, 1862 (aged 34); Bergen, Norway
- Occupations: Actress, singer
- Children: Berglioth Prom
- Relatives: Camilla Wiese

Helene Marie Reutzer Wiese (April 9, 1828 – July 3, 1862) was a Norwegian actress and singer.

Helene Wiese was born in Bergen, the daughter of the Indonesian military surgeon Erling Anton Onthong Wiese (1799–1860) and Catharina Petronelle Albrechtsen (1805–1850). She was the sister of the singer and voice teacher Camilla Wiese. She married the actor Jacob Prom (1831–1865) in Bergen on October 2, 1854, and they were the parents of the actress, singer, and voice teacher Berglioth Prom.

Wiese debuted on January 29, 1851 at the Norwegian Theater in her hometown of Bergen, in the role of Constance in Johan Ludvig Heiberg's play Aprilsnarrene (April Fools). She remained engaged at this theater until her death. In 1854, she was a guest performer with the Trondheim theater troupe of Bergen under the direction of Henrik Ibsen.

During her time, Wiese achieved far greater fame as a singer than as an actress. With her beautiful singing voice, she made a strong impression in the popular vaudeville performances of the time.

== Selected roles ==
- Constance in Aprilsnarrene (April Fools) by Johan Ludvig Heiberg (Norwegian Theater, 1851)
- Kari in Julegjæsten (The Christmas Guest) by Claus Pavels Riis (Norwegian Theater, 1852)
- Karen in Anna Kolbjørnsdatter by Rolf Olsen (Norwegian Theater, 1852)
- Mrs. Berg in Sancthansnatten (St. John's Eve) by Henrik Ibsen (Norwegian Theater, 1853)
