= Karen Marie Fougner =

Norwegian actress (1840–1907)

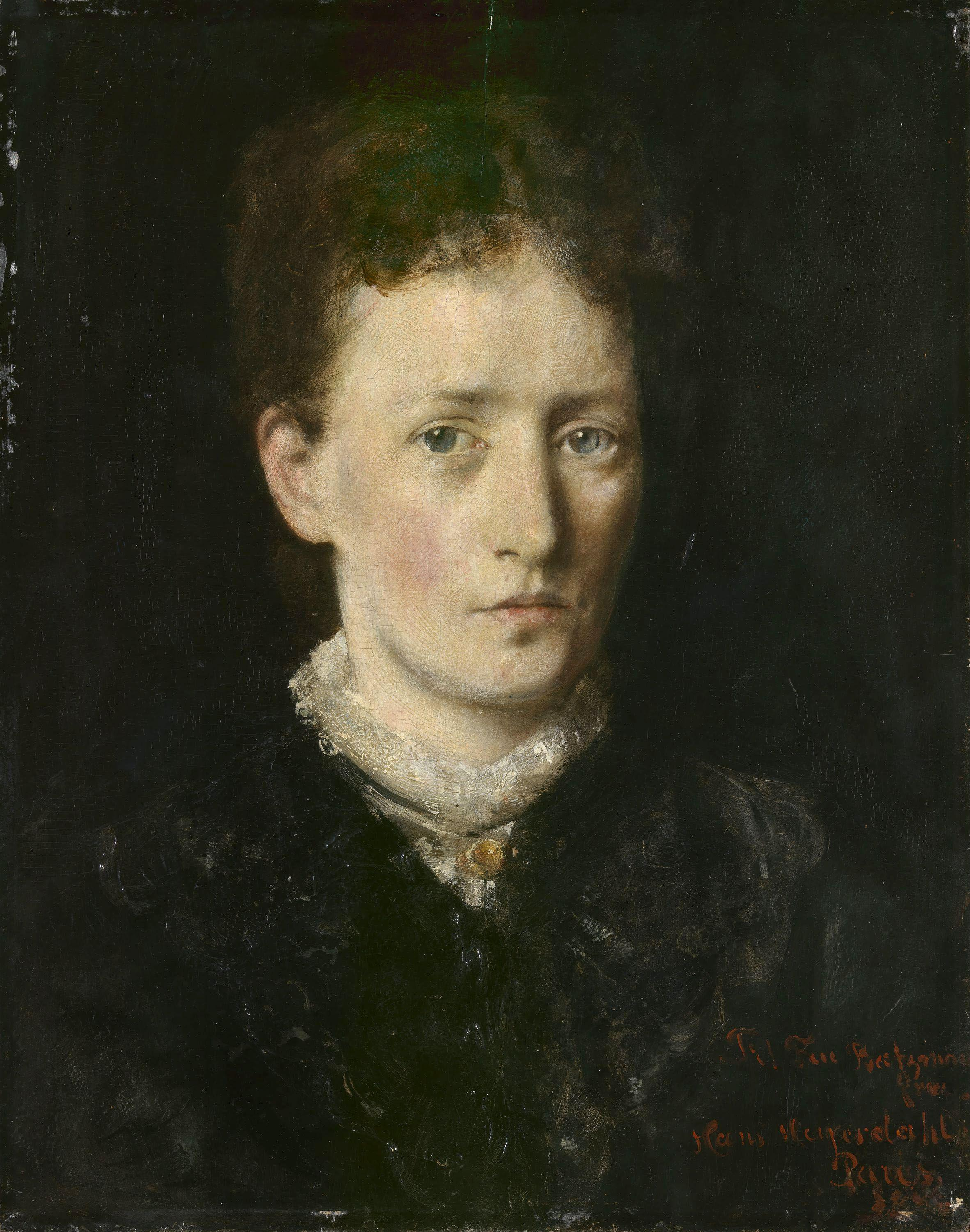
- Image of Karen Marie fouqner
- Born: January 5, 1840; Bergen, Norway
- Died: December 31, 1907 (aged 67); Asker, Norway
- Occupation: Actress
- Spouse: Frederik Bætzmann
- Children: Ellen Prom, Kitty Wentzel

Karen Marie Fougner (January 5, 1840 – December 31, 1907) was a Norwegian actress.

== Family ==
Karen Marie Fougner was born in Bergen, the daughter of the hat-maker and later proprietor Johan Eilert Fougner (1815–1884) of the prominent Fougner family, and Alida Cathrine Brunfeldt (1815–1896). On July 12, 1863, she married the actor Jacob Prom (1831–1865) in Bergen. Following the death of her first husband, on October 16, 1867, she married Samuel Frederik Bætzmann (1841–1913) in Christiania (now Oslo). By her first marriage she became the mother of the actress Ellen Prom, and by her second marriage the mother of the journalist, actor, sculptor, and writer Kitty Wentzel.

== Life and work ==
Fougner debuted on December 2, 1860, at the Norwegian Theater (Norwegian: Det norske Theater) in her home town of Bergen in the title role of the romantic comedy Tonietta by Henrik Hertz. This was followed by her performance of Margit in Henrik Ibsen's The Feast at Solhaug.

From 1863 to 1865, she was engaged at the Norwegian Theater in Trondheim together with her husband Jacob Prom.

Fougner debuted at the Christiania Theater on May 17, 1866, when she reprised the role of Margit in The Feast at Solhaug. She was engaged at that theater until she remarried in 1867. That fall she also had several performances in Bergen.

In 1877 she published the play Der skal Skabet staa (That's the Way It Will Be).

== Selected roles ==
- Tonietta in Tonietta by Henrik Hertz (Norwegian Theater, 1860)
- Margit in The Feast at Solhaug by Henrik Ibsen (Norwegian Theater)
- Eline in Lady Inger of Ostrat by Henrik Ibsen (Norwegian Theater, 1861)
- Mrs. Warming in En liden Hemmelighed (A Little Secret) by Frantz Johannes Hansen (Trondheim, 1863)
- Madame Sommer in the comedy Plader (Platters) by Christian Wengel (Trondheim, 1863)
- Grete in Kjærlighet uten strømper (Love without Stockings) by Johan Herman Wessel (Trondheim, 1863)
- The lady in Valbygaasen (The Goose of Valby) by Erik Bøgh (Trondheim, 1863)
- Nicole in Le Bourgeois gentilhomme by Molière (Christiania Theater, 1866)
- Magdelone in Erasmus Montanus by Ludvig Holberg (Bergen, 1867)
- Baronesse von Schroffenstein in The Daughter of the Regiment by Gaetano Donizetti (Bergen, 1867)

== Works ==
- 1877: Der skal Skabet staa (That's the Way It Will Be), comedy in two acts
