= Frederik Bætzmann =

Norwegian journalist, foreign correspondent and editor

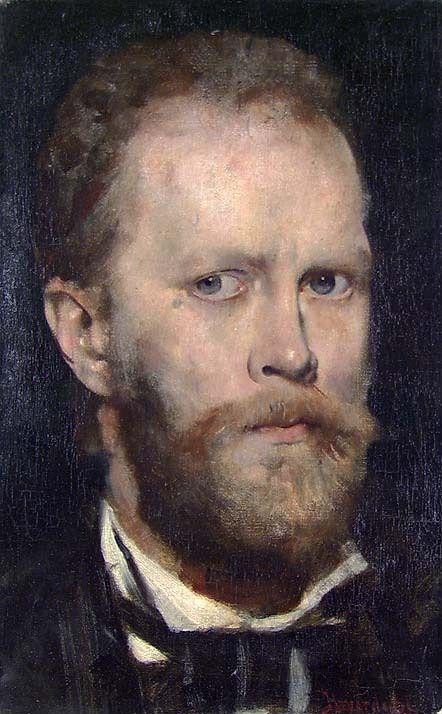
- Portrait of Editor Samuel Frederik in National Museum of Art, Architecture and Design
- Born: 16 October 1841; Trondheim, Norway
- Died: 2 May 1913 (aged 71); Rome, Italy
- Occupation: Journalist
- Children: Kitty Wentzel

Samuel Frederik Bætzmann (16 October 1841 – 2 May 1913) was a Norwegian journalist, foreign correspondent and editor.

Bætzmann was born in Trondheim. His father, Samuel Severin Bætzmann (1800–1859), was mayor of Trondheim and served as a member of the Norwegian Parliament. He was married to Karen Marie Fougner (1840–1907). He was the father of the journalist Kitty Wentzel and father-in-law of the painter Gustav Wentzel.

He traveled in Italy and England from 1859 to 1860. Between 1860 and 1864, he was mostly in Rome, where he was a secretary and librarian in the Scandinavian Society. From 1864 to 1865 he edited the periodical Illustreret Nyhedsblad. He worked for the newspaper Aftenbladet from 1867 to 1871 and for Dagbladet from 1871, later for a short period as editor-in-chief. Between 1878 and 1883, he resided in Paris as correspondent for both Dagbladet and Aftenposten. From 1884 to 1892, he was the Paris correspondent for Aftenposten. From 1892 to 1908 he was the political editor of Aftenposten.

Bætzmann settled in Rome from 1908. During this period, he published the book Italiens frihedskamp with Aschehoug in 1911. He died in Rome in 1913.
