= Gustav Wentzel =

Norwegian painter (1859–1927)

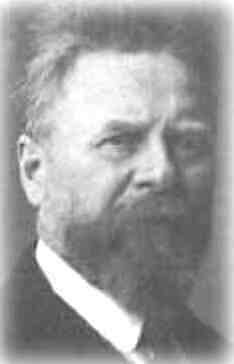
- Born: 7 October 1859; Christiania, Norway
- Died: 10 February 1927 (aged 67); Lillehammer, Norway
- Occupation: painter

Gustav Wentzel (1859–1927) was a Norwegian painter. He was best known for interiors and domestic and rural scenes. His artistic style was associated with Naturalism and noted for accurate observations and attention to detail.

== Biography ==
He was the eldest of seven children. His father, Jørgen, was a farm owner and salmakermester (someone who makes transport accessories, such as harnesses and seats). While still a boy, his father went bankrupt and his mother, Anne, opened a meat store to support the family.

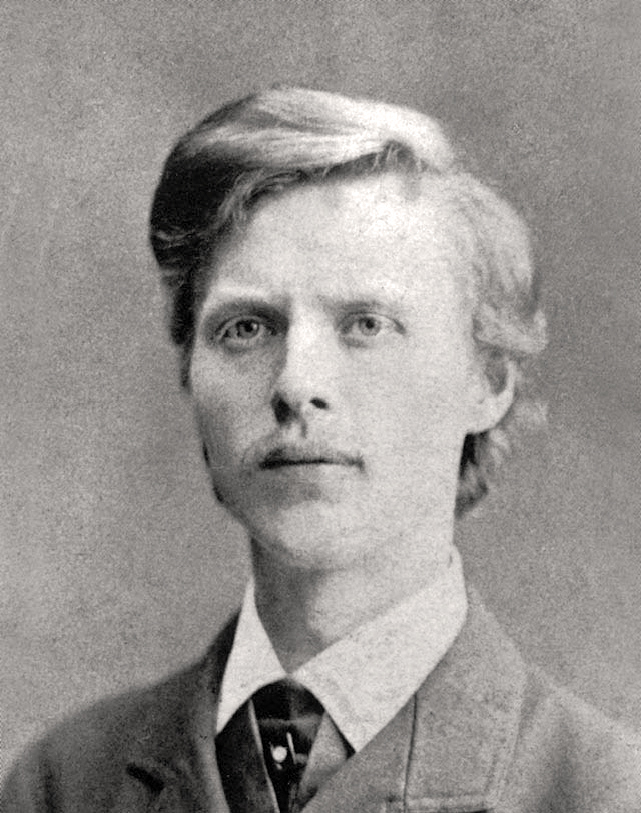
Wentzel in the early 1880s

At the age of fifteen, he was apprenticed to a mason because he intended to become an architect. That same year, he began to take drawing lessons and decided to pursue art instead. From 1875 to 1878, he was a student at the Norwegian National Academy of Craft and Art Industry then, until 1880, studied painting with Knud Bergslien. His first, small, showing was at the bookstore owned by Albert Cammermeyer. He soon became part of a circle of artists that met at the studios of the sculptor, Rolf Skjefte.

He took his first study trip in the summer of 1880, accompanied by Harald Bertrand and Jacob Lofthus. They visited Hardanger and Telemark. The following year, he went to Kvitsøy, supported by a grant from the Schäffers Legat, a fund for painters, sculptors and poets. On the advice of Andreas Aubert, he travelled to Valdres in 1882, where he painted landscapes and interiors; notably at the Hegge Stave Church.

He was in Paris in 1883 and again in 1884, with another grant from the Schäffers Legat, and studied with William Bouguereau at the Académie Julian. In 1888 and 1889, he was back in Paris on a state scholarship, studying with Léon Bonnat and Alfred Philippe Roll at the Académie Colarossi. While there, he met and married the writer, Christiane Marie Bætzmann (known as "Kitty"), daughter of Frederik Bætzmann, the Paris correspondent for Aftenposten. She had been studying at the Académie, but never painted professionally.

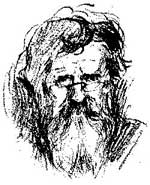
Self-portrait (1925)

They returned to Norway and settled in an outlying neighbourhood of Christiania. Later, they moved to Asker Municipality, where they became close friends of Hulda and Arne Garborg. In 1901, a financial windfall enabled them and their two young children to travel to Italy, but a planned stay in Paris did not come to fruition. Upon their return in 1902, they settled in Vågå Municipality. The following year, he sent eighty-five works to an art auction, but twelve were never sold and the others were bought cheaply, which plunged him into doubts about his chosen profession.

Despite this failure, and his continued depression, he was awarded the Order of St. Olav in 1908. At home, however, things went less well. That same year, Kitty took their youngest son with her to the United States, where she worked as a governess. By 1910, their marriage was apparently one in name only and he began teaching at a painting school operated by Harriet Backer. She helped him receive a grant that enabled him to spend those difficult times in Munich. He returned to Norway in 1913. By that time, his family was living in Lom Municipality. He visited them often and opened his last studio near there, in 1919.

Although he had to produce low-quality paintings in large quantities to pay his bills, he was generally happy there and well-respected by the locals. In 1927, he went to the hospital in Lillehammer for the treatment of an oral inflammation and died there, of pneumonia, shortly after. Kitty spent much of the rest of her life promoting his works and wrote a biography of him in 1956. Their homes in Lom have been preserved and are partly open to the public. In 1999, a major exhibit was held commemorating Wentzel and the architect Bjarne Tøien (1899–1963), who is also associated with Lom.

== Selected paintings ==
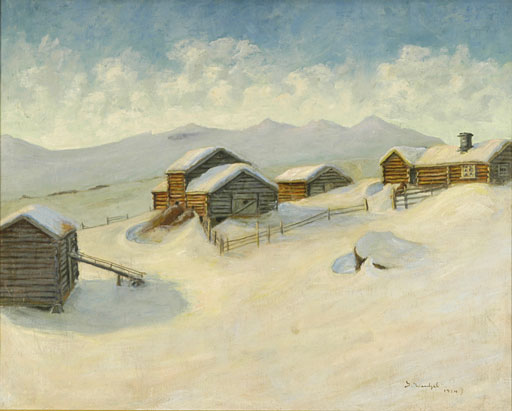
Winter Scene from Vågå Municipality (1914)

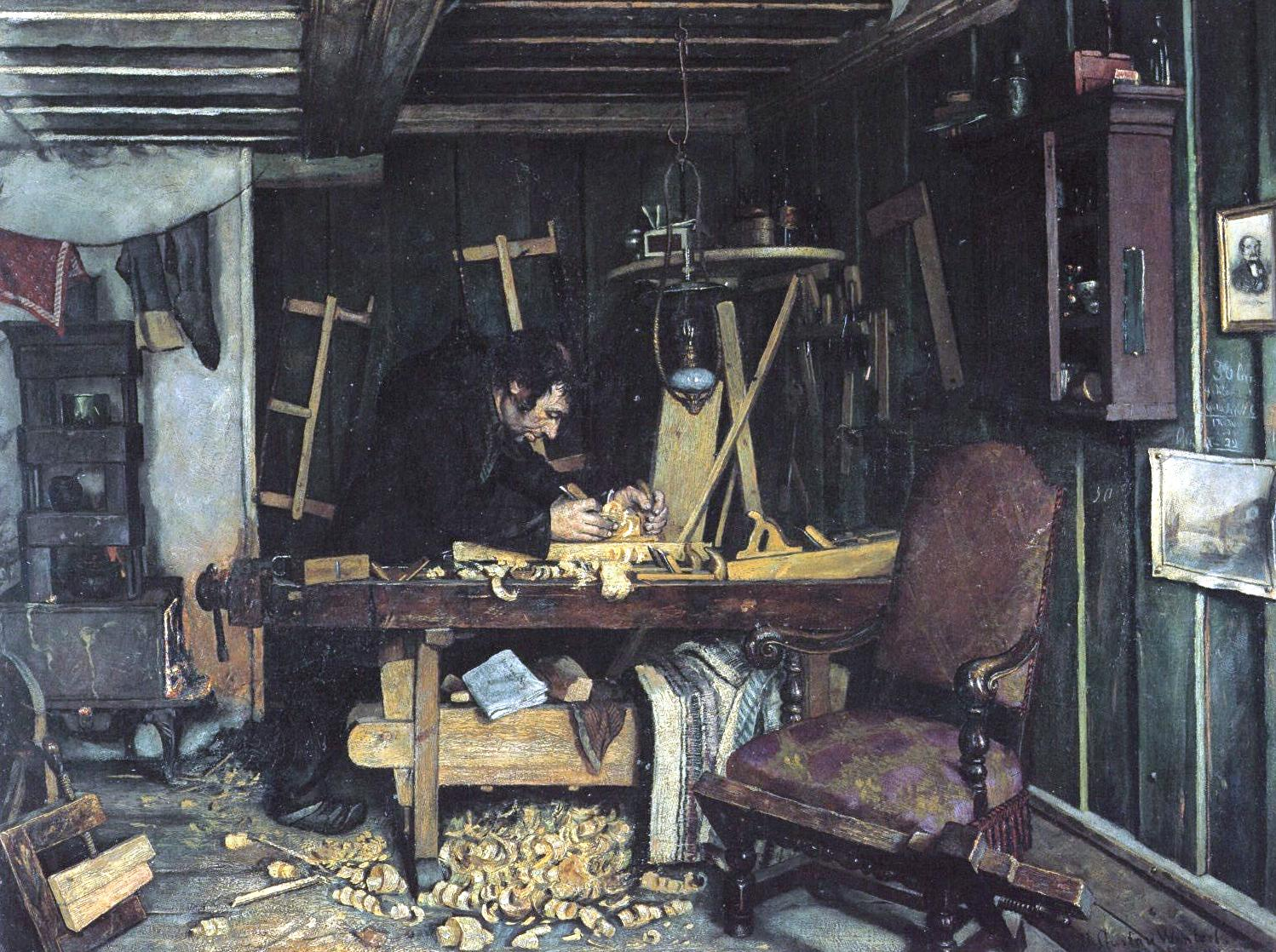
Joiner's Workshop (1881)

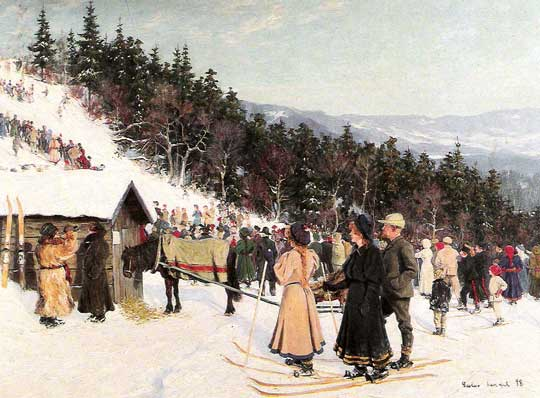
Ski Races in Fjelkenbakken (undated)

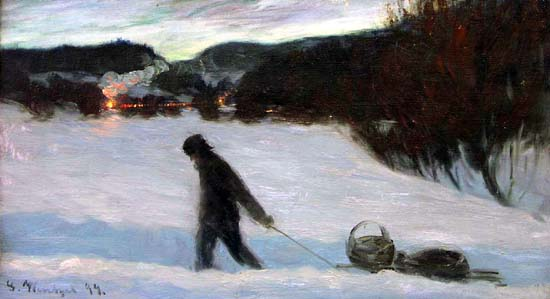
Night Train (1899)

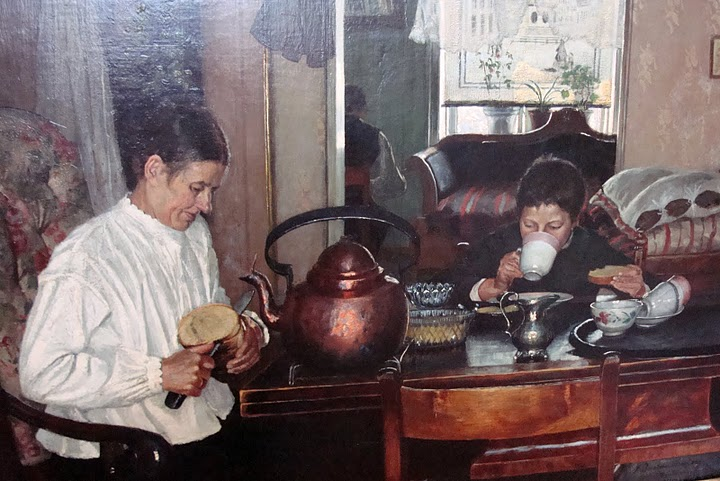
Breakfast (1882)

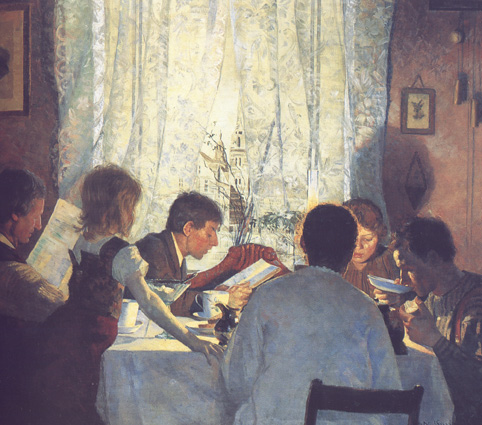
Breakfastt II/Morning Mood (1885)

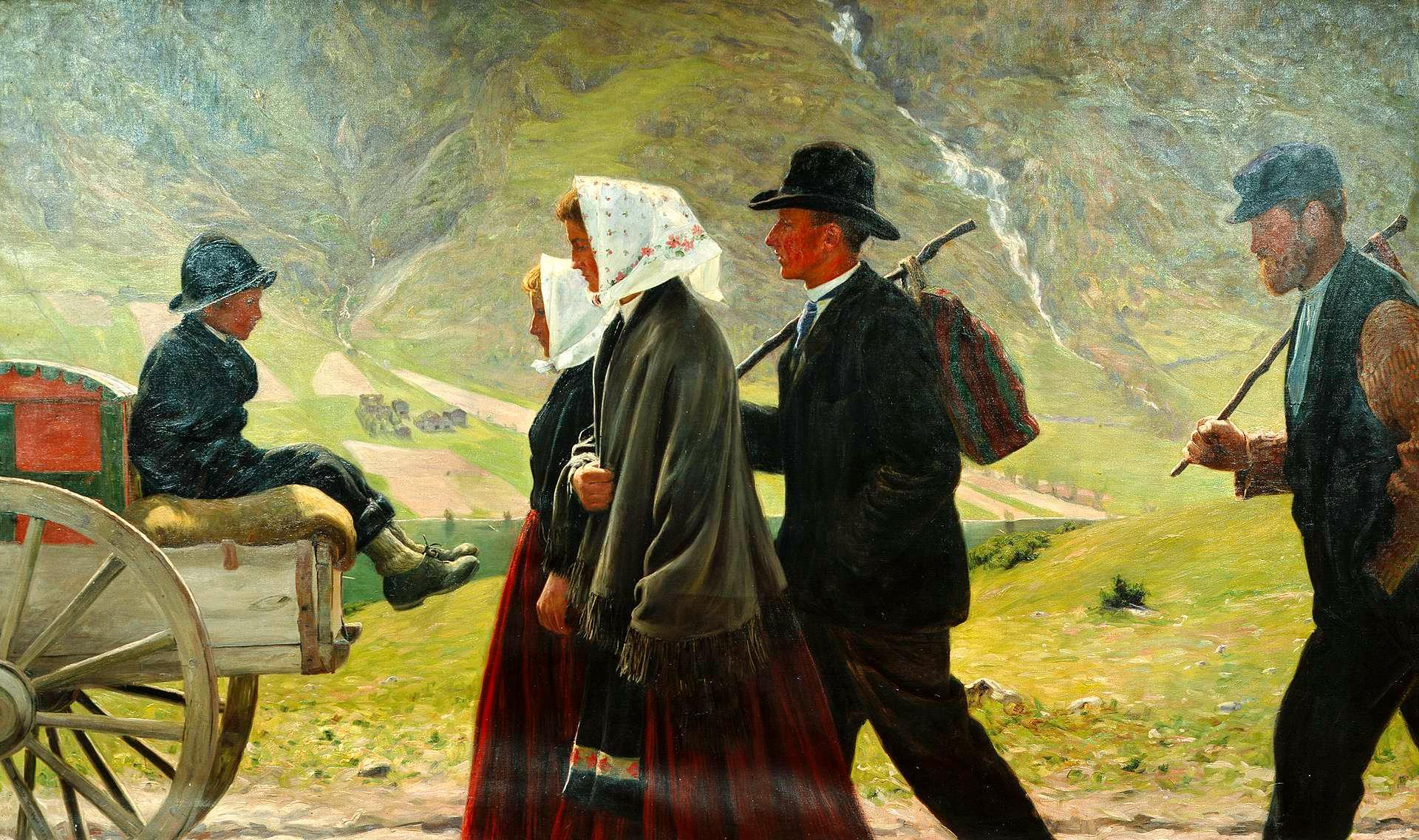
Emigrants (1903)

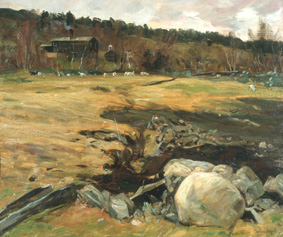
Autumn Landscape (undated)
