= Fatum (Tchaikovsky) =

Symohonic poem by Pyotr Ilyich Tchaikovsky

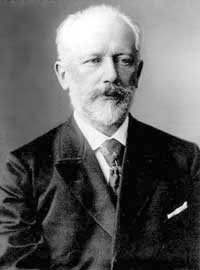
Pyotr Ilyich Tchaikovsky

Fatum (sound sample)
Organ arrangement: Josh Perschbacher

Fatum, or Фатум, meaning Fate, is a "symphonic fantasy" by Pyotr Ilyich Tchaikovsky, given the opus number 77 after his death but more representatively listed in the Tchaikovsky Handbook as TH41. It was written in 1868 and premiered the following year. Tchaikovsky later tried to destroy copies of the score; the work was however rescued and published three years posthumously.

== History ==
Tchaikovsky started the symphonic poem Fatum between late September and early October 1868. He put the work aside to devote his attention to the touring Belgian soprano Désirée Artôt, with whom he had fallen in love (or so he thought). They discussed marriage, and planned to meet again in the summer of 1869 in Paris to develop their plans. She then left for Warsaw to continue her tour with her opera company.

Tchaikovsky completed the outline of the work by 21 October/2 November, and completed the scoring in December 1868. Its first performance took place on 15/27 February 1869 at the eighth concert by the Russian Musical Society in Moscow, conducted by Nikolai Rubinstein. Tchaikovsky had not written it with any known program, but for the premiere performance, the text of verses by Konstantin Batyushkov about the futility of human life were added as an epigraph to the score, although it is not certain that this was Tchaikovsky's idea, or that he was even familiar with those verses. While the audience were baffled by the discrepancy between the melancholy theme of the Batyushkov verses and the brighter tenor of the music they nevertheless applauded the music warmly. On the evening of the debut, Tchaikovsky wrote to his brother Anatoly, "It seems to be the best thing I have written so far; at least, that is what people are saying (a considerable success)."

Tchaikovsky then sent the score to Mily Balakirev, and asked him to accept the dedication of the work. Balakirev accepted, and said he would arrange another performance, no matter what he thought of the music. Fatum was performed again in Saint Petersburg on 17/29 March at the ninth concert of the Russian Musical Society, conducted by Balakirev. However, the second performance was not the popular success the first performance had been. Balakirev wrote to Tchaikovsky:

Your Fatum has been performed [in St. Petersburg] reasonably well ... There wasn't much applause, probably because of the appalling cacophony at the end of the piece, which I don't like at all. It is not properly gestated, and seems to have been written in a very slapdash manner. The seams show, as does all your clumsy stitching. Above all, the form itself just does not work. The whole thing is completely uncoordinated.... I am writing to you with complete frankness, being fully convinced that you won't go back on your intention of dedicating Fatum to me. Your dedication is precious to me as a sign of your sympathy towards me—and I feel a great weakness for you.

M. Balakirev—who sincerely loves you.

Other critics also referred to its artistic unevenness. By now, both Tchaikovsky and Désirée Artôt had had a change about their intended marriage. Neither advised the other of this, but he was nevertheless shocked when he learned through a third party (Nikolai Rubinstein) that she had married another man, the Spanish baritone Mariano Padilla y Ramos, in September 1869. Tchaikovsky's favourable view of Fatum had also changed - he had come to regard it as a failure. He destroyed the manuscript in the 1870s and it was not performed again or published in his lifetime. He did, however, re-use the lyrical theme from Fatum in the duet for Natalia and Andrei in Act IV of his opera The Oprichnik, but transposed from A-flat major to D-flat major.

In 1896, after Tchaikovsky's death, the score was reconstructed from the original orchestral parts and published by Mitrofan Belyayev with the posthumous opus number 77.

The piece has a duration of around 14 minutes. It has received a number of recordings.

== Performance history ==
Performances of Tchaikovsky's Fatum, during and after his life.

- Moscow, Russian Empire: 27 February 1869, conducted by Nikolai Rubinstein (premiere)
- Saint Petersburg, Russian Empire: 29 March 1869, conducted by Mily Balakirev (Saint Petersburg premiere)
- London, Great Britain: 28 October 1899, conducted by Henry Wood at Queen's Hall

== Instrumentation ==
The music is scored for piccolo, 2 flutes, 2 oboes, cor anglais, 2 clarinets in B, 2 bassoons, 4 horns, 3 trumpets in F, 3 trombones, tuba, timpani, cymbals, triangle, tam tam, harp and strings.
