= Camilla Wiese =

Norwegian singer and voice teacher

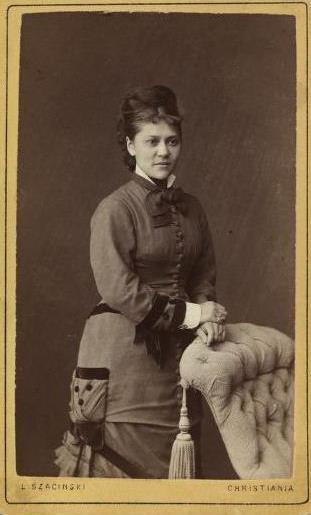
- Born: June 3, 1845; Bergen, Norway
- Died: March 4, 1938 (aged 92); Oslo, Norway
- Occupation(s): Singer, actress
- Relatives: Helene Wiese

Camilla Theodora Antonsdatter Wiese (June 3, 1845 – March 4, 1938) was a Norwegian mezzo-soprano and voice teacher.

== Family ==
Camilla Wiese was the daughter of the Indonesian military surgeon Erling Anton Onthong Wiese (1799–1860) and Catharina Petronelle Albrechtsen (1805–1850). She was the sister of the actress Helene Wiese (1828–1862), who was married to the actor Jacob Prom, and the singer Eugenie Wiese Rosenkilde (1837–1909). Camilla Wiese did not marry and she had no descendants.

== Career ==
Wiese appeared at the Royal Swedish Opera in Stockholm on May 28 and June 2, 1873 in the role of Nancy in Martha by Friedrich von Flotow. In March and April 1874 she performed at the same venue as Pierotto in Linda di Chamounix by Gaetano Donizetti. Wiese performed at the theater in Bergen in 1874, and received an engagement at the Christiania Theatre in 1875, where she performed as Hedwige in Gioachino Rossini's opera Wilhelm Tell. She received a state scholarship and used this to travel to Paris, where she studied under Pauline Viardot.

At the first performance of Henrik Ibsen's play in verse Peer Gynt at the Christiania Theatre, Camilla Wiese, Amalie Døvle, and Hanna Ehn played the three alpine dairymaids. The premiere took place on February 24, 1876. More memorably, she is said to have later hid behind the curtains in Act Four and performed "Solveig's Song" because Thora Hansson, who played the role of Solveig, had a rather rough voice. Hansson sat on a rock and lip-synced while the audience wondered how she was able to sing with such a clear voice. It was the head of the Ibsen Museum in Oslo, Erik Henning Edvardsen, who told the author Lucinda Riley in the 2010s how Wiese stood in the curtains and performed Hansson's song. The story thus took its fictionalized literary form in the novel The Storm Sister.

Throughout her career, Wiese held a number of concerts in Norway. She was particularly noted as a performer of Romantic songs and a singer at church concerts, and she was dubbed Norges største romansesangerinne 'Norway's greatest Romantic singer'. Wiese was a soloist at the celebration of Edvard Grieg's 25th anniversary as a pianist and composer in Kristiania with two concerts on November 14 and 21, 1891. Other performers at the concert were Ellen Gulbranson, Thorvald Lammers, the choir of the Oslo Music Society, the Choir Society, the Christiania Theatre Orchestra, the Tivoli Orchestra, and Johan Hennum as concertmaster. Edvard Grieg conducted the concerts himself.
