= Ingrid Bjoner =

Norwegian soprano (1927–2006)

- Born: Ingrid Kristine Bjoner Pierpoint; 8 November 1927; Kråkstad, Akershus, Norway
- Died: 4 September 2006 (aged 78); Oslo, Norway
- Education: University of Oslo
- Occupations: Operatic soprano composer
- Years active: 1956–1997
- Spouse: Thomas Reynolds Pierpoint Jr. (1922–1999)
- Parents: Johan Bjoner (1877–1950) (father); Alma Prestangen (1890–1982) (mother)
- Awards: St. Olav's Medal; Order of St. Olav

Ingrid Kristine Bjoner Pierpoint (8 November 1927 – 4 September 2006) was a Norwegian soprano who had an international opera career between 1956 and 1990. She was particularly celebrated for her portrayal of Wagnerian heroines and for her performances in operas by Richard Strauss. In addition to performing in operas, Bjoner was an active concert soloist and recital performer throughout her career.

== Biography ==
=== Background ===
Ingrid Kristine Bjoner was born at Kråkstad in Akershus, Norway. Her parents were Johan Bjoner (1877–1950) and Alma Prestangen (1890–1982). She was the eighth of nine children born to a farming family. Bjoner was educated as a pharmacist at the University of Oslo during which time she also studied voice with Gudrun Boellemose. She drew considerable public notice after an extraordinary performance at Oslo Cathedral which reoriented her path towards a professional musical career. She travelled to Germany for further voice lessons with Paul Lohmann at the Musikhochschule Frankfurt and Franziska Martienssen-Lohmann in Düsseldorf.

In 1956, Bjoner made her first professional appearance singing the roles of the Third Norn and Gutrune for a radio broadcast of Richard Wagner's Götterdämmerung produced by the Norwegian Broadcasting Corporation and starring Kirsten Flagstad as Brünnhilde. In 1957 she made her stage debut as Donna Anna in Mozart's Don Giovanni with the Norwegian National Opera; reprising the role later that year for her debut at the Wuppertal Opera. Bjoner went on to sing several more roles in Wuppertal between 1957 and 1959. Also in 1957, she portrayed the title role in Handel's Rodelinda at the Drottningholm Palace Theatre through the invitation of Flagstad.

=== Career ===
In 1959, Bjoner joined the roster at the Deutsche Oper am Rhein where she sang regularly for three seasons. That same year she made her first appearance at the Vienna State Opera where she returned periodically through 1986 in such roles as Ariadne in Ariadne auf Naxos, Desdemona in Otello, Leonore in Fidelio, Rezia in Oberon, and the title role in Turandot.

In 1960, Bjoner made her United States debut with the San Francisco Opera as Elsa in Wagner's Lohengrin and her debut at the Bayreuth Festival as Freia, Helmwige, and Gutrune in Wagner's Ring Cycle, both of them critical successes. That same year she earned contracts with the Royal Swedish Opera and the Norwegian National Opera which made her a repeat performer in those houses during the 1960s and 1970s. This was followed by engagements at various opera houses around the world throughout the 1960s, including the Polish National Opera, La Monnaie Brussels, Teatro dell'Opera di Roma, Hamburg State Opera, Vienna State Opera, Vancouver Opera, Zürich Opera, Miami Opera, Philadelphia Lyric Opera Company, and The Royal Opera London among others.

In 1961, Bjoner joined the roster at the Bavarian State Opera where she performed repeatedly through 1965. Her roles with the company included the Empress in Richard Strauss's Die Frau ohne Schatten (1963), the title role in Strauss's Daphne (1964), and Isolde in Wagner's Tristan und Isolde (1965) among others. During this time, Bjoner was also engaged by the Metropolitan Opera in New York City between 1961 and 1967. Her first appearance at the Met was as Elsa on 28 October 1961 opposite Sándor Kónya as Lohengrin. Her other roles at the Met during this time included Ariadne, Countess Almaviva in Le nozze di Figaro, Donna Anna, the Empress, Eva in Die Meistersinger von Nürnberg, and Gutrune. While in New York, she sang the role of The Duchess of Parma for the American premiere of Ferruccio Busoni's Doktor Faust presented in a concert setting at Carnegie Hall on 1 December 1964.

In 1965, Bjoner made her debut at La Scala as Elsa and in 1967 she returned to Covent Garden to appear in three operas: Leonore in Fidelio, Senta in The Flying Dutchman, and Sieglinde in Die Walküre. That year she made her debut at the Teatro Colón in Buenos Aires as Empress in Die Frau ohne Schatten returning in 1969 for Der Freischütz, Fidelio, Der fliegende Hollander and 1980 again as Leonora. She appeared at the Salzburg Festival in both 1969 and 1970 as Leonore and reprised that role again in a return to the Met in 1971. In 1970 she performed for the first time at the Teatro Real, the Royal Danish Opera, and the Pittsburgh Opera. In 1972, she made her debut at the Palais Garnier singing Isolde and the title role in Giacomo Puccini's Tosca. She returned to the Met again in 1974 to sing Turandot. She returned to La Scala in 1975 to sing Brünnhilde in Götterdämmerung. Other notable appearances during the 1970s include performances at the Staatsoper Stuttgart, Royal Swedish Opera, Norwegian National Opera, Deutsche Oper Berlin, Vienna State Opera, and several Bayreuth festivals among others.

In 1981, Bjoner made her debut at the Cologne Opera as Elisabeth in Tannhäuser. In 1985, she directed her first opera, Strauss's Elektra, at the Norwegian National Opera which she also starred in as the title part. She repeated that feat the following year at the Royal Danish Opera. In 1986, she returned to the Bayreuth festival once again to sing Isolde and Kostelnička Buryjovka in Jenůfa. In 1987, she recorded Elektra for the Italian radio RAI and in 1988 returned to the Bavarian State Opera to sing Färberin in Die Frau ohne Schatten. In 1989 she appeared as Senta at the Norwegian National Opera and gave her last opera performance in 1990 as Färberin at the Badisches Staatstheater Karlsruhe.

After retiring from her performing career, Bjoner served on the faculty of the Norwegian Academy of Music (1992–97) and visiting professor at the Royal Danish Academy of Music (1991). One of her notable pupils was operatic soprano Turid Karlsen.

== Awards ==
In 1964, she was awarded the St. Olav's Medal by King Olav V of Norway and in 1980 she was made a Commander in the Royal Order of St. Olav. In 1992, her bust by sculptor Nils Aas was unveiled at the Norwegian Opera. In 1995, she was awarded the Anders Jahre Cultural Prize (Anders Jahres kulturpris) jointly with Jan Garbarek.

== Personal life ==
In 1960, she married Thomas Reynolds Pierpoint Jr. (1922–1999). She died in 2006 in Oslo.
