= Lona Gyldenkrone =

Norwegian operatic soprano (1848–1934)

Lona Gulowsen
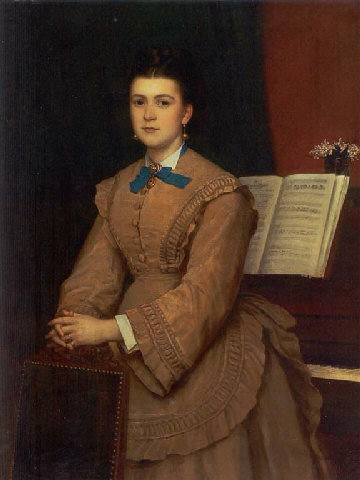
- Born: January 30, 1848; Oslo, Norway
- Died: May 29, 1934 (aged 86); Copenhagen, Denmark
- Occupation: Opera singer

Baroness Abelone "Lona" Birgitte Gyldenkrone, (née Gulowsen; 1848–1934) was a Norwegian operatic soprano. After first performing at a concert in the Christiania Theatre, Oslo, in 1871, she made her debut at the Royal Swedish Opera in 1876 as Mathilde in Rossini's William Tell. From 1878, she appeared mainly in concerts and operas in Germany but also performed in Scandinavia and Russia. On marrying the Danish diplomat Baron Emil Gyldenkrone in 1882, she settled in Denmark where she became a voice teacher.

== Early life, family and education ==
Abelone Birgitte Gulowsen was born in today's Oslo, Norway (then Christiania, Sweden-Norway), on 30 January 1848. She was the daughter of the merchant Anders Gulowsen and his wife Nanna Dithlovine Cecilie née Gabrielsen. After first being trained by Henrik Meyer (1868–71), she became a student of Pauline Viardot in Paris.

== Career ==
Lona Gulowsen first appeared in public at a concert at the Christiania Theatre in 1871 but it was not until 1876 that she made a successful debut at the Royal Swedish Opera in Stockholm as Mathilde in William Tell. In the autumn of the same year, she was engaged by the opera company of Norway's Christiania Theatre where she was recognized for her singing and stagecraft skills in roles including Susanne in Mozart's The Marriage of Figaro, Marguerite in Gounod's Faust, Violetta in Verdi's La traviata, Leonora in his Il trovatore and Venus in Wagner's Tannhäuser.

After the fire in the Christiania Theatre caused opera presentations to be discontinued, Gulowsen gave concerts in Norway and Sweden before returning to Paris in 1878 for further training under Viardot. She then moved to Germany where she gave a number of concerts in Dresden and Berlin and went on an extended tour of Germany, Russia and Poland with the Polist violinist Henryk Wieniawski. In 1879 she was engaged by the Court Opera in Schwerin where she performed for the next three years.

While in Germany, she met the Danish diplomat Baron Emil Gyldenkrone whom she married in August 1882. They settled in Copenhagen where she performed in a few charity concerts. After retiring from the stage, she became a highly respected instructor.

Lona Gyldenkrone died in Copenhagen on 29 May 1934.
