= Lola Artôt de Padilla =

French-Spanish soprano

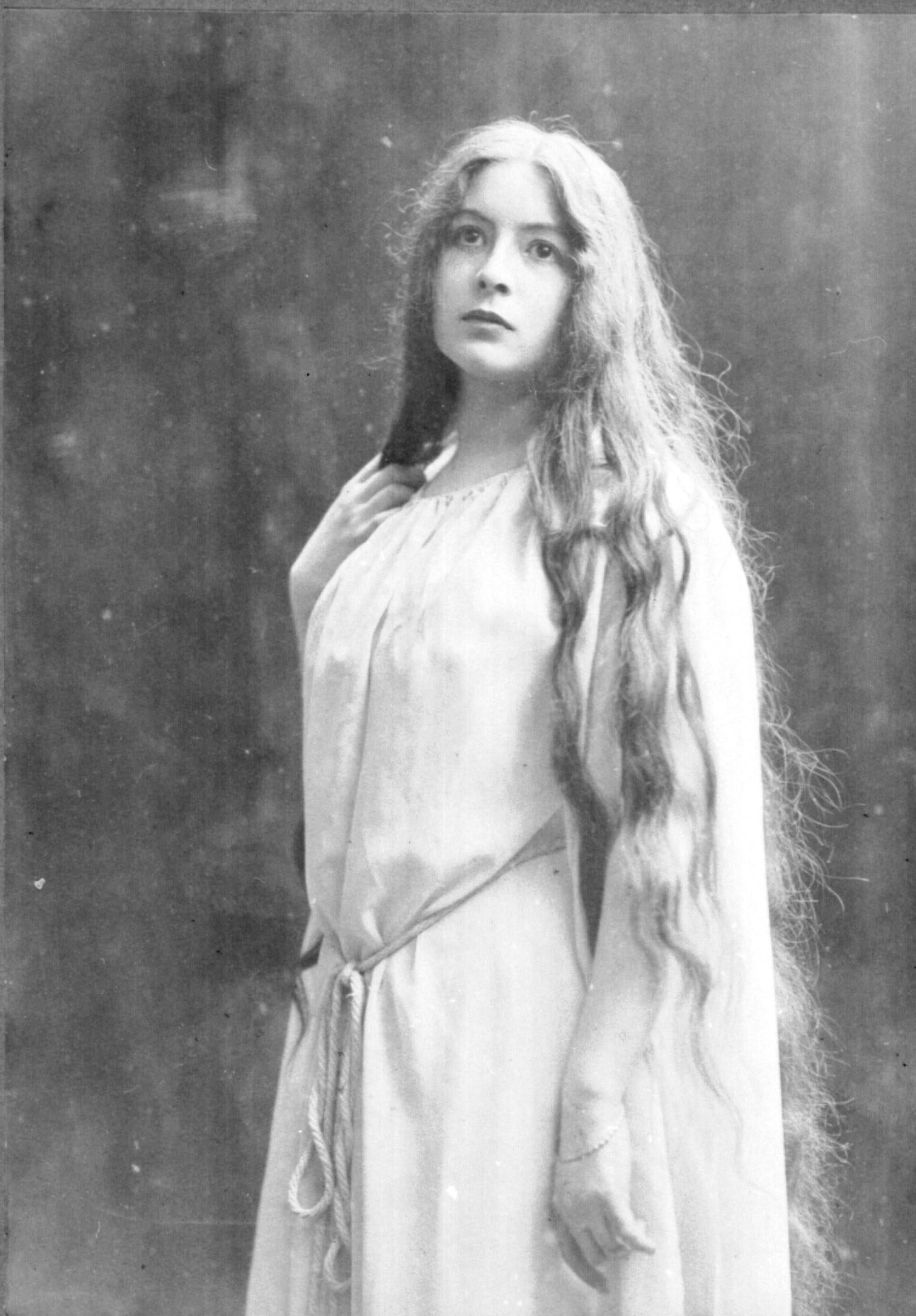
Portrait of Lola Artôt de Padilla

Lola Artôt de Padilla (born Dolores de Padilla, 5 October 1876 - 12 April 1933) was a French-Spanish soprano, renowned in Germany, where she mainly sang.

== Biography ==
Lola Artôt de Padilla (birth name Dolores de Padilla) was born in Sèvres near Paris on 5 October 1876. Her mother was the Belgian-born soprano Désirée Artôt (de Padilla), and her father was a well-known Spanish baritone, Mariano Padilla y Ramos. When Her parents married in 1869 her mother was still formally engaged to Pyotr Ilyich Tchaikovsky, and he only later learned of their wedding after it had occurred. Her godmother was her mother's singing teacher Pauline Viardot. Her mother was her sole singing teacher, and she learned Viardot's methodology from her.

Artôt de Padilla began her career as a concert soprano in Paris in 1902. That same year she gave a concert tour of Scandinavia and Poland prior to appearing her first opera at the Hoftheater Wiesbaden in the title role of Thomas's Mignon. In 1904 she gave her first opera performance in Paris; playing a minor role on the stage of the Opéra-Comique. From 1905 until 1908 she sang at the Komische Oper Berlin. At the theatre she created the role of Vreli (Juliet) in Frederick Delius's A Village Romeo and Juliet (Berlin, 21 February 1907).

From 1909 until 1927 Artôt de Padilla worked at the Berlin Hofoper (BH); making her debut there as Zerlina in Don Giovanni. She was celebrated at this theater for performances as Zerlina, Countess Almaviva in Mozart's The Marriage of Figaro, Micaëla in Bizet's Carmen, and Oscar in Verdi's Un ballo in maschera. In 1910 she starred in the world premiere of Arthur Nevin's Poia at the BH. In 1911 she was the first person to perform the role of Octavian in Richard Strauss's Der Rosenkavalier in Berlin. Strauss much admired her portrayal of this part, saying later it was the best he had ever witnessed.

Other operas Artôt de Padilla performed in for their first performances in Berlin included Humperdinck's Königskinder (1911, as the Goosegirl), Strauss's Ariadne auf Naxos (1916, as the Composer) and Ferruccio Busoni's Turandot (1921, as Turandot). Other roles in her repertoire included Cherubino in The Marriage of Figaro, Charlotte in Massenet's Werther, and Marie in Smetana's The Bartered Bride. She also performed in other cities in Germany and in the Netherlands, Paris, Scandinavia and Poland. According to Peter G. Davis, she exhibited great vocal ability but never achieved legendary status; although her skill surpassed some of the more famous singers of her era.

Lola Artôt de Padilla died in Berlin in 1933 at the age of 56. She was buried at the Stahnsdorf South-Western Cemetery near Berlin.

== Recordings ==
She made a number of recordings and she appears in EMI's The Record of Singing.
