= Mariano Padilla y Ramos =

Spanish opera singer (1843–1906)

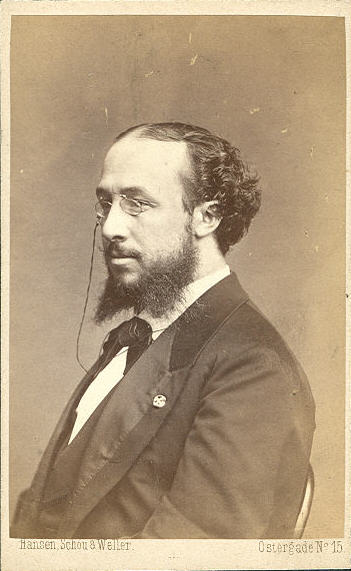
Mariano Padilla y Ramos (photograph by Hansen, Schou & Weller)

Francisco de Asís Mariano del Carmen Marco Padilla y Ramos; 18 July 1843 – 21 November 1906), known as Mariano Padilla y Ramos, was a Spanish operatic baritone who excelled in the title role of Mozart's Don Giovanni.

== Biography ==
Padilla was born in Murcia, the son of city attorney Antonio Marco Padilla and Manuela Ramos Alba from Beniel. He had five brothers.

He studied under Teodulo Mabellini in Florence and appeared in many European countries, including England, where he sang in Giacomo Meyerbeer's Dinorah in 1881. He appeared at Covent Garden in 1887. He appeared in Prague that year in the centenary performance of Don Giovanni.

He is perhaps best remembered as the man whom the Belgian soprano Désirée Artôt married, to the great surprise of her unofficial fiancé, Pyotr Ilyich Tchaikovsky. Artôt had been performing in Russia in 1868, where she met and fell in love with Tchaikovsky. Her feelings were reciprocated, and they discussed marriage, although they were never formally engaged. Nevertheless, there was an understanding of sorts between them. She had to continue on her touring schedule and left for Warsaw, but they planned to meet again at her estate near Paris in the summer of 1869.

However, without any warning or communication with Tchaikovsky (as the social conventions of the time would have demanded), Artôt married Padilla y Ramos - they were members of the same opera company - although she had earlier ridiculed him to Tchaikovsky, and he was seven years her junior (Tchaikovsky himself was five years her junior). The marriage occurred on 15 September 1869, either in Sèvres or Warsaw.

Their daughter, the soprano Lola Artôt de Padilla, also became a noted opera singer.

Mariano Padilla y Ramos died in Paris in November 1906, aged 63, just four months before Désirée Artôt died.
