= Mellem Slagene =

1857 play by Bjørnstjerne Bjørnson

Mellem Slagene (Between the Battles, also translated in 1941 as Between the Acts) is a one-act historical play from 1857 by Bjørnstjerne Bjørnson. The work was published the same year as his best-known work, the peasant novel Synnøve Solbakken. The play was first staged at the Christiania Theater on October 27, 1857. The work was well-received by the critics, and it is still included in the school curriculum to this day.
