= Turid Karlsen =

Norwegian operatic soprano and voice teacher

Turid Karlsen (born 1961) is a Norwegian operatic soprano and voice teacher who has had an active international performing career since the 1980s. Known for her portrayals of roles from the dramatic soprano repertoire, she won the Kirsten Flagstad Prize in 2004 for her portrayal of Senta in Richard Wagner's Der Fliegende Holländer with the Norwegian National Opera. During her career, she has performed under the batons of several notable conductors, including Daniel Barenboim, Dennis Russell Davies, Placido Domingo, Hartmut Haenchen, Kent Nagano, and Michael Tilson Thomas. She is currently a professor of vocal music at the Hochschule für Musik und darstellende Kunst Stuttgart.

== Life and career ==
Born in Oslo, Karlsen studied singing in her native city with Ingrid Bjoner at the Norwegian Academy of Music and with Mija Besselink at the Maastricht Academy of Music. From 1985 to 1992 she was a resident artist at the Badisches Staatstheater Karlsruhe. She then worked as a resident artist at Theater Bonn from 1992 to 1997. As a guest artist, she has performed leading roles with Bavarian State Opera, Dallas Opera, De Nederlandse Opera, Deutsche Oper Berlin, Gran Teatre del Liceu, Hamburg State Opera, Los Angeles Opera, Madison Opera, Opéra de Montréal, Opéra de Québec, Orlando Opera, Palm Beach Opera, Royal Swedish Opera, Stadttheater Luzern, Staatsoper Hannover, Teatro Real, and Zurich Opera among others.

In 2006 Karlsen made headlines when she became the first soprano to sing the title role in Puccini's Turandot at The Göteborg Opera since Birgit Nilsson. In 2008 she was the soprano soloist in a performance of Mahler's Symphony No. 8 at Canada's Lanaudiere Festival; a performance which was attended by 12,000 spectators and was broadcast live throughout North America in honour of the 400th anniversary of Quebec. That same year she sang her first Isolde in Wagner's Tristan und Isolde in a concert at Neuschwanstein Castle with the Stuttgart Philharmonic. She went on to sing the role in staged productions in 2009 at the Bielefeld Opera and the Hessisches Staatstheater Wiesbaden.

== Opera roles ==
The following are roles Karlsen has created on stage:

- Abigaile, Nabucco (Giuseppe Verdi)
- Arabella, Arabella (Richard Strauss)
- Ariadne, Ariadne auf Naxos (Richard Strauss)
- Donna Anna, Don Giovanni (Wolfgang Amadeus Mozart)
- Elsa, Lohengrin (Wagner)
- Fiordiligi, Così fan tutte (Wolfgang Amadeus Mozart)
- Isolde, Tristan und Isolde (Wagner)
- Königin der Nacht, The Magic Flute (Wolfgang Amadeus Mozart)
- Konstanze, Die Entführung aus dem Serail (Wolfgang Amadeus Mozart)

- La Contessa, The Marriage of Figaro (Wolfgang Amadeus Mozart)
- Leonora, Il Trovatore (Verdi)
- Leonore, Fidelio (Beethoven)
- The Marschallin, Der Rosenkavalier (Richard Strauss)
- Mimì, La bohème (Puccini)
- Rosalinde, Die Fledermaus (Johann Strauss)
- Salome, Salome (Richard Strauss)
- Senta, Der fliegende Holländer (Wagner)
- Turandot, Turandot (Puccini)
- Violetta, La traviata (Giuseppe Verdi)

== Concert repertoire ==
The following are works Karlsen has performed with major symphony orchestras:

- Beethoven's Missa Solemnis
- Beethoven's Symphony No. 9
- Benjamin Britten's War Requiem
- Antonín Dvořák's Requiem

- Leoš Janáček's Glagolitic Mass
- Mahler's Symphony No. 2
- Mahler's Symphony No. 8 (sopranos #1 and #2)
- Giuseppe Verdi's Requiem
