= Kitty Wentzel =

Norwegian writer and journalist

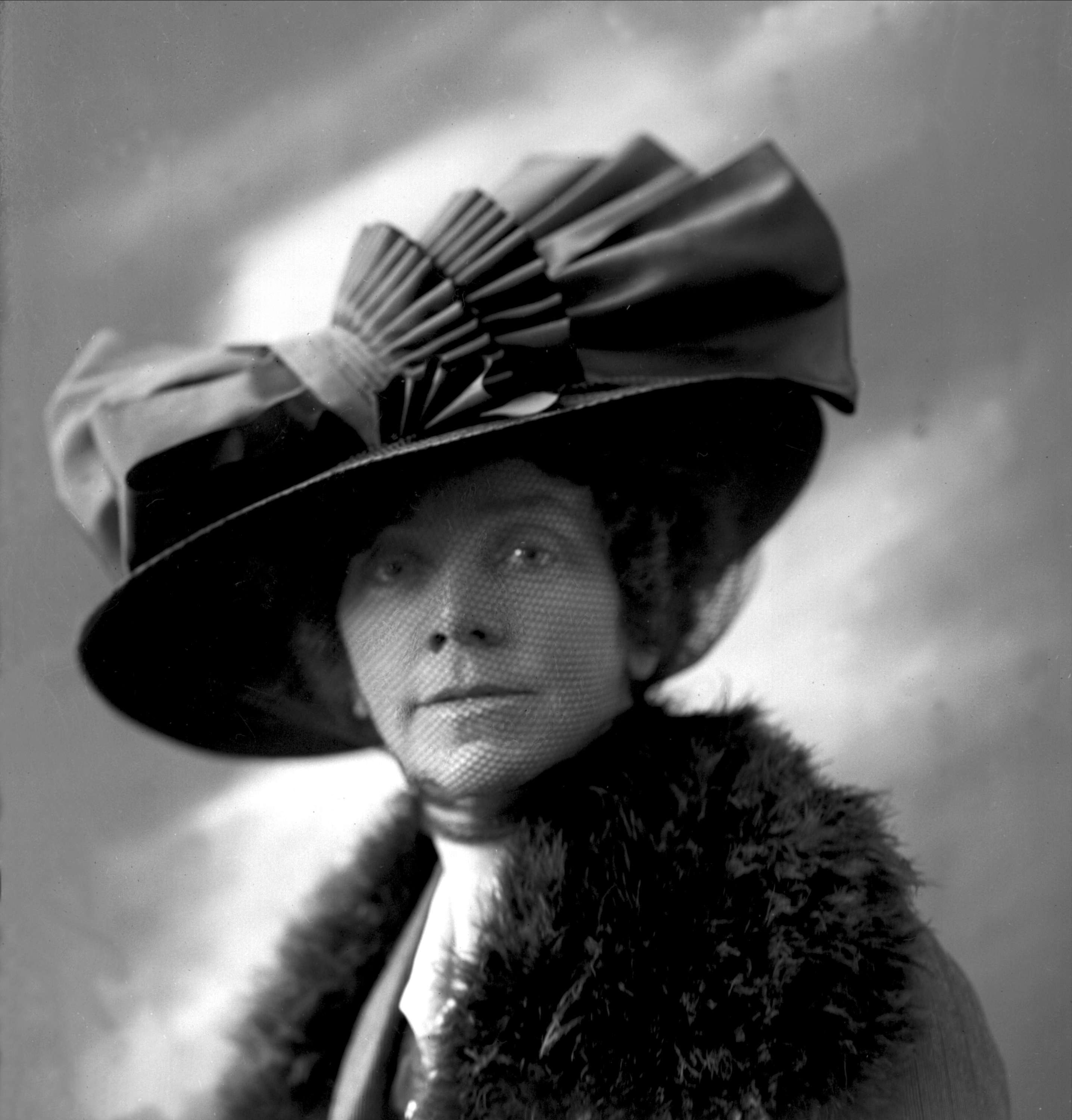
- Kitty in 1915. Photo by Gustav Borgen.
- Born: 9 August 1868; Christiania, Norway
- Died: 20 November 1961 (aged 93)
- Occupation: Journalist
- Spouse: Gustav Wentzel
- Parent: Frederik Bætzmann

Kitty Wentzel (née Bætzmann; 9 August 1868 – 20 November 1961) was a Norwegian writer and journalist. She was born in Christiania, and was the daughter of the journalist Frederik Bætzmann and the actress Karen Marie Fougner. She was married to painter Gustav Wentzel. She was a journalist for the newspaper Verdens Gang from 1913 to 1917, and for Ørebladet from 1917 to 1924.

Among her books are Bordets glæder from 1925, written jointly with Øvre Richter Frich, the biography Gustav Wentzel from 1956, and the memoirs Fra mitt livs karusell from 1960.
