= Boris Eifman =

Russian choreographer and artistic director

- Борис Эйфман
- On day of 80th anniversary
- Born: 22 July 1946 (age 80); Rubtsovsk, Soviet Union
- Citizenship: Russia
- Education: Leningrad Conservatory
- Occupations: Ballet master, choreographer
- Employer: Vaganova Academy of Russian Ballet

Boris Yakovlevich Eifman (Note: Russian: Борис Яковлевич Эйфман; Ukrainian: Борис Яковлевич Эйфман, romanized: Oleh Kostiantynovych Antonov.) (born 22 July 1946) is a Russian choreographer and artistic director. He has done more than fifty ballet productions.

== Biography ==
Eifman was born in Rubtsovsk, Siberia, where his engineer father had been assigned to work in a tank factory. In 1953, the family moved to Kishinev, Moldavia. Eifman graduated from the Kishinev Ballet School in 1964. He performed as a dancer with the Kishinev Opera and Ballet Theatre; and went on to study choreography at the Leningrad Conservatory, where his teacher was choreographer Georgi Aleksidze. Eifman graduated from the Leningrad Conservatory in 1972. He then became a ballet master at the Vaganova Academy of Russian Ballet, from 1972-1977.

In 1977, he received permission to found his own company, originally known as Leningrad Theatre of Contemporary Ballet. The troupe was known by various names, but today its official title is St. Petersburg State Ballet Theatre of Boris Eifman, or simply Eifman Ballet of St. Petersburg when on tour. In addition to choreographing for his own company, Eifman has created ballets for the Maly Theatre of Opera and Ballet, the Kirov Ballet, the Bolshoi Ballet, Les Ballets de Monte Carlo, and New York City Ballet, among others. He has also made dances for film and television.

Eifman's family was required to move from Kharkov to Siberia during World War II. Though conditions in Siberia were hard, the move saved their lives. The Eifmans are Jewish; and the Nazis killed his father's family in Kharkov and Kiev. In Siberia, they lived in a "pit" with six rooms that housed six-ten families. "If the Government did not build real housing it was not because of money, but because people were not treated like people, but like cattle," Eifman says. After the family moved to Moldavia, Eifman began studying ballet and folk dance, from the age of seven, with the Young Pioneers. His parents initially opposed his desire for a dance career, but he began to experiment with choreography as a teenager.

Eifman's interest in dramatic subjects for his choreography places his work in a long-standing Russian tradition. This tradition dates back to the 18th century, and the foundation of the Russian school of ballet by disciples of Jean-Georges Noverre. Eifman has said, "the type of philosophical theater that I am working to create was not born in the Soviet Union...That's an idea that belongs to Noverre."

Valentina Matviyenko celebrating to 80th anniversary of Boris Eifman, 22 July 2026

The choreographer has stated that his work for his own company can be divided into three periods: "the Soviet period, the perestroika era, and the last 10 years." During the first period, he worked mostly without government subsidy and was subject to strict censorship. In spite of these restrictions, however, he won a popular following by choreographing to rock 'n roll music (Pink Floyd) and dared to address controversial themes. The authorities suggested that he emigrate, but he did not wish to leave St. Petersburg. During the second period, which began with his 1987 ballet The Master and Margarita and overlapped with perestroika, Eifman enjoyed more artistic freedom. His company made its first international tour, to Paris, in 1989. The third period began in 1996, when impresario Sergei Danilian approached him leading to the Eifman Ballet's US debut in 1998.The company made their first appearance at the London Coliseum arranged by Gavin Roebuck in 2012.

== Works ==
- Gayané (1972)
- Firebird (1975)
- Towards Life
- The Meetings
- The Beautiful Impulses of the Soul
- Only Love (1977)
- The Song Broken (1977)
- Double Voice (1977)
- Firebird (1978)
- Movement Eternal (1979)
- Boomerang (1979)
- The Idiot (1980)
- Autographs (1981)
- Day of Madness, or, The Marriage of Figaro (1982)
- The Legend (1982)
- Metamorphoses (1983)
- Twelfth Night (1984)
- Second Lieutenant Romashov (1985)
- Intrigues of Love (1986)
- The Master and Margarita (1987)
- Adagio (1987)
- Pinocchio (1989)
- Les Intrigues de l'Amour (1989)
- The Passions of Man (1990)
- Thérèse Raquin, aka The Murderers (1991)
- Tchaikovsky: the Mystery of Life and Death (1993)
- The Karamazovs (1995)
- Red Giselle (1997)
- My Jerusalem (1998)
- Requiem (1998)
- Russian Hamlet: the Son of Catherine the Great (1999)
- Don Juan and Molière (2000)
- Don Quixote or Fantasies of a Madman
- Who's Who (2003)
- Musagète (2004)
- Anna Karenina (2005)
- The Seagull (2007)
- Onegin (2009)
- Rodin
- Up and Down
- The Pygmalion Effect (2019)

== Honours and awards ==
With Tatyana Golikova on 2021 Government Prize of Culture, 18 May 2022

On presentation ceremony of Honorary citizen of Saint Petersburg, 27 May 2021

With Russian President Vladimir Putin on presentation of the State Prize of the Russian Federation, 12 June 2018

With Russian President Vladimir Putin on presentation of the Order of Honour, 22 September 2016

With Golden Mask Award, 16 April 2016

- People's Artist of Russia (Russia, 1995)
- Order of Merit for the Fatherland, 2nd (2012) class
- Order of Honour
- Commander of the Order of Arts and Letters (France, 1999)
- Commander of the Order of Merit of the Republic of Poland (2003)
- State Prize of the Russian Federation - 1998
- Theatre Award of Saint Petersburg "Golden Soffit" (1995, 1996, 1997, 2001, 2005, 2012)
- "Golden Mask" (Theatre Union of Russia, 1996 and 1999)
- Award "Triumph "(1996)
- Prix Benois de la Danse for "Best choreographer of 2005" (2006)
- Order of "Peace and Harmony" (Russia, 1998)

== Bibliography ==
- Аловерт, Нина. "Балетний Театр Бориса Эйфмана." (16 Сентября 1994 Года) Новое Русское Слово.
- Johnson, Robert. "A Traditionalist Who Seeks To Update the Russian Soul." (April 5, 1998) The New York Times.
- Alovert, Nina. "Fantasies of a Dreamer." (April 1998) Dance Magazine, pp. 62–66.
- Barnes, Clive. "The Eifman Cometh." (July 1998) Dance Magazine.
- Gold, Sylviane. "Dance of the Dissident." (January 17, 1999). Newsday.
- Kisselgoff, Anna. "Smoldering Emotion Kindled by Motion." (January 17, 1999) The New York Times.
- Singer, Thea. "Boris Eifman Makes Dances from Turmoil." (March 19, 2000) The Boston Globe.
- Bayley, Mary Murfin. "Russian Dance Star Stayed True to Vision." (March 22, 2001). The Seattle Times.
- Alovert, Nina. "Eifman's Jubilee: Russia's Only Modern Ballet Company Celebrates 25 Years of Innovation." (January 2002). Dance Magazine, pp. 68–73.
- Bohlen, Celestine. "An Escape Artist Trained During the Soviet Circus." (March 24, 2002) The New York Times.
- Goodwin, Joy. "No Rest for a Russian Renegade." (April 15, 2007). The New York Times.
- Bachko, Katia. "The Eifman Experience: Boris Eifman Celebrates 30 Years with His Company." (April–May 2007). Pointe.
- Johnson, Robert. "Boris Eifman Comes to America" in Choreographer Boris Eifman: the Man Who Dared. Ardani. New York: 2018.
