= History of Molde =

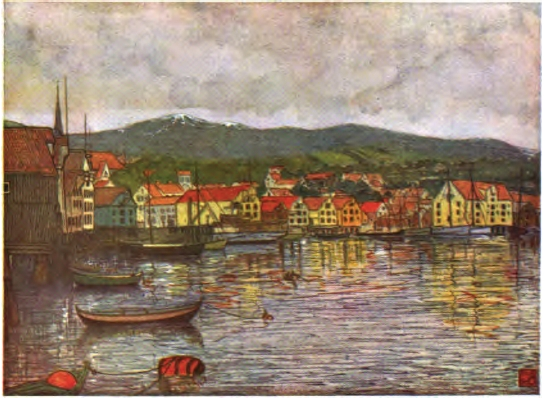
Illustration of Molde Nico Wilhelm Jungmann (1904)

The History of Molde in Møre og Romsdal county, Norway can be traced back to the Middle Ages. Settlement in the area can be traced further back in time - evidence given by two rock slabs carved with petroglyphs found at Bjørset west of the center of the town of Molde in the present day Molde Municipality.

== History ==
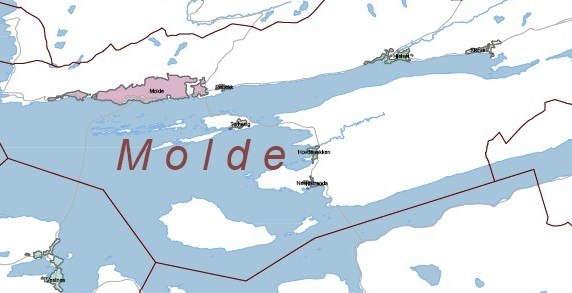
Molde on the north shore of the Moldefjord, an arm of Romsdal Fjord, on the Romsdal peninsula

=== Trading post ===
The early medieval settlements on Veøya, an island south of the present-day town of Molde, was strategically situated at the junction where the three fjords met the large Romsdal Fjord leading westwards to the Romsdal coast and the shipping routes. Veøya was first mentioned by the historian Snorri Sturluson as the location of the Battle of Sekken in 1162, where King Håkon the Broad-shouldered was killed fighting the aristocrat Erling Skakke, during the Norwegian civil wars, but the settlement is known to be far older than that. The Old Veøy Church, built around 1200 AD, still stands on the island. At the eve of the 15th century, Veøya had lost most of its influence, and the island was eventually deserted (except for the parish priest).

After the decline of nearby trading posts Bud and Veblungsnes, a minor port called Moldefjæra (Molde Landing) emerged around 1600, on land from the two farms Reknes and Molde (later Moldegård), based on trade with timber and herring to mainly Dutch, but also English, Scottish and Portuguese merchants. Molde gained formal trading rights before 1604 under the supervision of Trondheim.

After the Treaty of Copenhagen in 1660, Molde became the administrative center of Romsdal amt (present day Møre og Romsdal County), and following a long commercial and administrative struggle with Trondheim and Bergen, it was finally incorporated through a royal charter in 1742.

=== Molde since 1742 ===
Molde continued to grow throughout the 18th and 19th Centuries, becoming a center for Norwegian textile and garment industry, as well as the administrative center for the region. At this point, tourism had become a major industry. This rapid development was interrupted when one third of the city, mostly its famous wooden buildings and rose gardens, was destroyed in a fire on 21 January 1916. However, Molde recovered quickly, and continued to grow in the economically difficult interbellum period.

A second fire, or series of fires, struck from the German air-raids in April and May 1940, and destroyed about two thirds of the city. German vanguards were trying to cut off and capture the king, cabinet, parliament, and national gold reserves, evacuated from Oslo following the attack on Norway on 9 April 1940. Arriving safely in Molde, the city was de facto capital of Norway from 22 April to 29 April, when the advancing German forces, combined with a failed British counter-attack, forced the Norwegian commander-in-chief, General Otto Ruge, to abandon Southern Norway and continue the fight from Tromsø. Under dramatic circumstances due to continuous German bombing, the King, Crown Prince, and government were evacuated on the British cruiser HMS Glasgow, and brought to safety.

During their time in Molde, King Haakon VII and Crown Prince Olav hid under the Royal Birch at Glomstua during a German bombing of the city. A famous photograph taken during this event was widely reprinted, and became a symbol of Norwegian patriotism and resistance against Nazi Germany. Close to the Royal Birch is the international Grove of Peace (see Bjørnson Festival).

=== Molde today ===
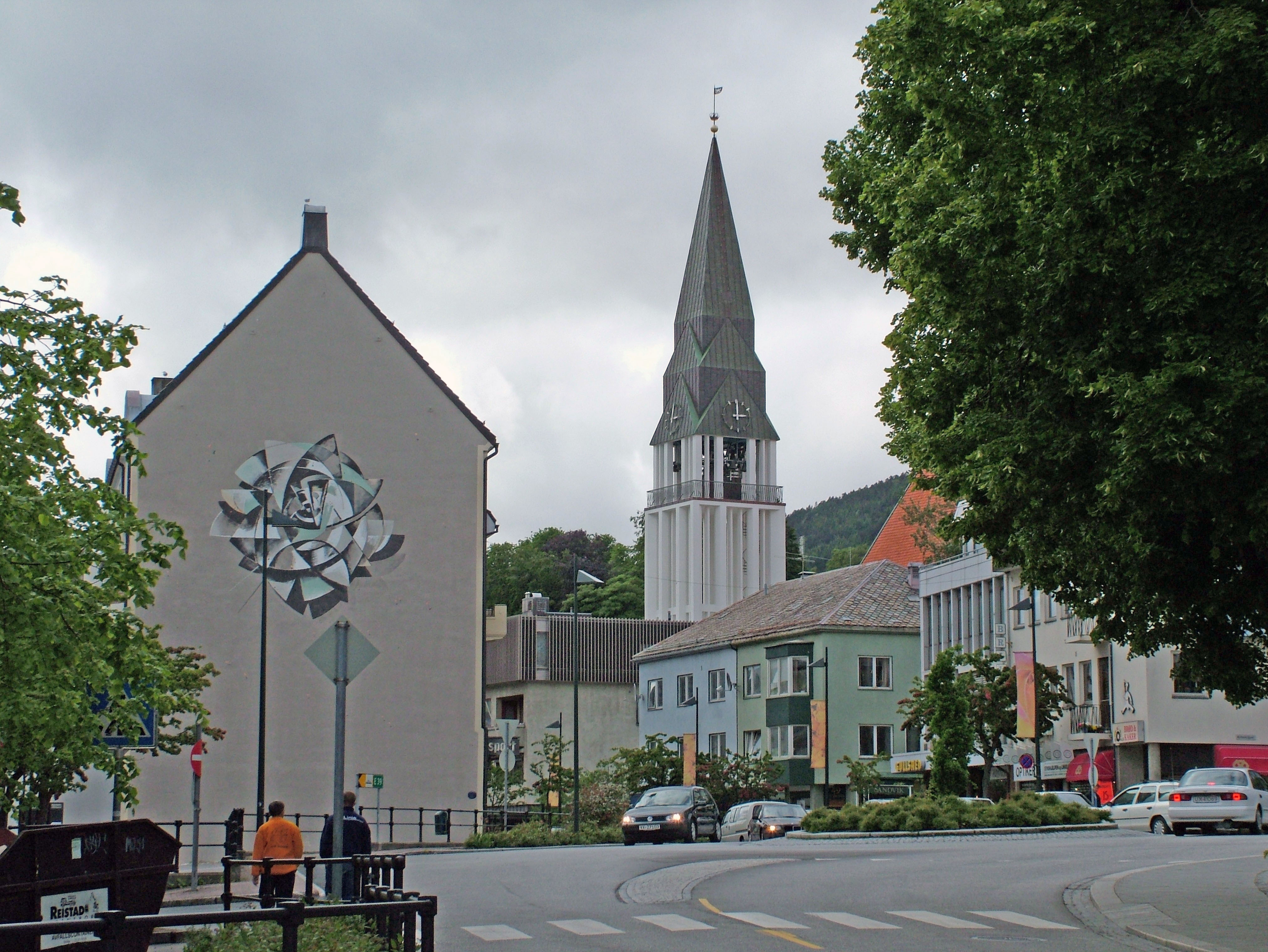
Molde's main street and commercial center. Molde Cathedral (orange roof on far right) with its freestanding bell tower replaces the church that was destroyed during World War II

Since World War II, Molde has experienced a tremendous growth. As the modernization of the Norwegian society accelerated in the post-reconstruction years, Molde became a center for not only administrative and public services, but also academic resources and industrial output. After a consolidation of the city and the neighboring Bolsøy Municipality and parts of Veøy Municipality and Nord-Aukra Municipality in 1964, Molde became a large, modern city, encompassing most branches of employment, from farming and fisheries, through industrial production, to banking, tourism, commerce, health care and civil administration.

The fjord with its islands and skerries and the mountains encircling the town, will continue to be the frame and the arena of the town's development in the years ahead.

The national poet Bjørnstjerne Bjørnson, expresses this sentiment in his poem Til Romsdalen:

"Everything I see has an eye, a voice

And the people? I know them all
Even those I have never met. I say:

If you know the fjord, you know the people"

=== Tourism ===
Cruise ship in Molde, sometimes referred to as "The Blue City"

Already a popular tourist destination of international fame in the second half of the 19th century, Molde saw notabilities such as the German emperor Wilhelm II of Germany and the Prince of Wales as regular summer visitors. The Kaiser referred to the city as "The Nice of the North", which gave a tremendous boost to the city's desirability as a tourist destination.

Drawn by its setting and the views of more than 222 rugged and partly snow-clad mountain peaks from all over the city, including from the viewpoint Varden, Molde became a desired port of call for the yachts and cruise ships of the European gentry up until World War I.

At the time, Molde consisted of luxurious hotels surrounding an idyllic township with quaint, wooden houses, lush gardens and parks, esplanades and pavilions, earning it the nickname "the Town of Roses".

This golden era came to a sudden end with the outbreak of World War I, and the devastating fire of 1916. Although tourism has never reached the magnitude and economic importance it once had, Molde is still a cruise ship and tourist destination.

=== Coat of arms ===
Coat of arms of Molde

The coat of arms is from 1742. It shows a whale chasing herring into a barrel, symbolizing the founding industries of the city - the export of fish and timber. Molde was never a whaling port; the whale is merely an echo of the ancient belief that whales were a good omen, chasing (and not following) the schools of fish into the fjords at certain times of the year.
