= Bjørn Bjørnson =

Norwegian actor and theatre director

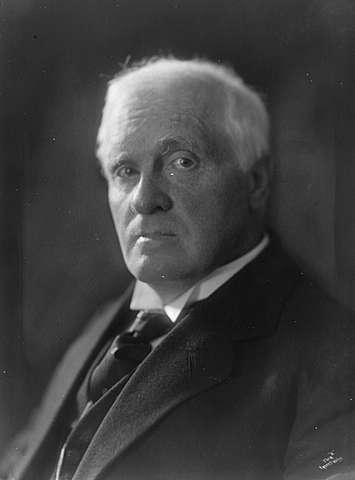
- Bjørn Bjørnson in 1922
- Born: 15 November 1859; Christiania, Norway
- Died: 14 May 1942 (aged 82)
- Occupations: Actor; Playwright; Theatre director Memoirist
- Spouse: Gina Oselio (2nd wife) (m. 1893; dissolved 1909)
- Parent(s): Bjørnstjerne Bjørnson; Karoline Reimers
- Relatives: Bergliot Ibsen (sister); Sigurd Ibsen (brother-in-law); Tancred Ibsen (nephew); Irene Ibsen Bille (niece); Inga Bjørnson (cousin); Erling Bjørnson (brother)

Bjørn Bjørnson (15 November 1859 – 14 May 1942) was a Norwegian stage actor and theatre director.

== Biography ==
He was born in Christiania, the son of author Bjørnstjerne Bjørnson and his wife Karoline Bjørnson. In 1876, he was admitted as a student at the Stern Conservatory operated by Julius Stern in Berlin, Germany. He also attended the Vienna Conservatory.

He was the artistic leader of Christiania Theatre from 1885 to 1893, and he was the first theatre director at the National Theatre, from its opening in 1899 until 1907, and again from 1923 to 1927. Besides being an actor and director, he also was a playwright.

In 1893 he married Norwegian opera singer Gina Oselio. Their marriage was dissolved in 1909.

== Selected works ==
=== Plays ===
- Moppy og Poppy (with M. O. Hansson), (1885)
- Johanne, (1898)
- Solen skinner jo (1913)
- En tørst kamel, (1919)

=== Books ===
- Vom deutschen Wesen: Impressionen eines Stammverwandten 1914-1917, (1917)
- Mit livs historier. Fra barndommens dage, (1922)
- Bjørnstjerne Bjørnson. Hjemmet og vennene. Aulestad-minner, (1932)
- Bare ungdom, (1934
- Det gamle teater. Kunsten og menneskene, (1937)

== Other sources ==
- Rønneberg, Anton (1974) Nationaltheatret, 1949-1974 (Gyldendal) ISBN 978-82-05-06254-2
- Marker, Frederick J. and Lise-Lone Marker (1996) A History of Scandinavian Theatre (Cambridge University Press) ISBN 978-0-521-39237-2
- Murer, Annette with Julian Garner translator (1977) The National Theatre of Norway (Boksenteret) ISBN 978-82-7683-156-6

Cultural offices
Preceded by position created	Director of the National Theatre; 1899–1907	Succeeded by Vilhelm Krag
Preceded by Halfdan Christensen	Director of the National Theatre; 1923–1927	Succeeded by Einar Skavlan
