= Bjørnson Festival =

Norwegian international literary festival

Coordinates: 62°44′10″N 7°09′20″E

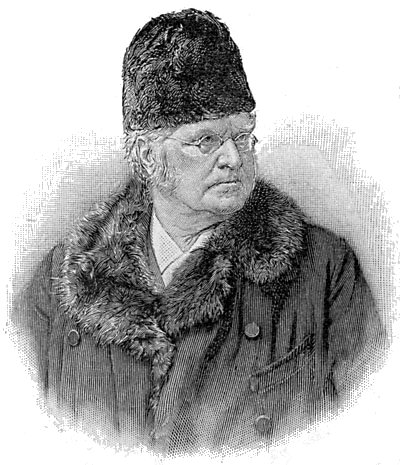
Bjørnstjerne Bjørnson

Bjørnson Festival (Bjørnsonfestivalen) is an international literary festival held annually during August / September in Molde Municipality in Norway.

The event is named in honor of the Nobel Prize in Literature laureate Bjørnstjerne Bjørnson who was raised in the area. The prime objective of the festival is to promote interest in literature and writing. The festival offers a program of seminars, art exhibitions and writing courses.

In parallel with the festival in Molde, festival events are held at Nesset Parsonage near Eidsvåg. This was Bjørnstjerne Bjørnson's childhood home. His father Peder Bjørnson was parish priest in Nesset from 1837 to 1853.

The Peace Grove (Fredslunden) is located next to the Royal Birch (Kongebjørka) in Molde. It was founded by author and poet Knut Ødegård, president of the Bjornson festival in 1997. The Peace Grove stands as a reminder of the international struggle for freedom, peace and human dignity. Among those who have planted trees in the Peace Grove are visiting authors including Wole Soyinka, Yasar Kemal, Vigdís Finnbogadóttir, Seamus Heaney, Amos Oz, Bei Dao, Hans Blix Qiu Xiaolong and Thor Heyerdahl.

== See also ==
- Norwegian Festival of Literature
