= En glad Gut =

Short story by Bjørnstjerne Bjørnson

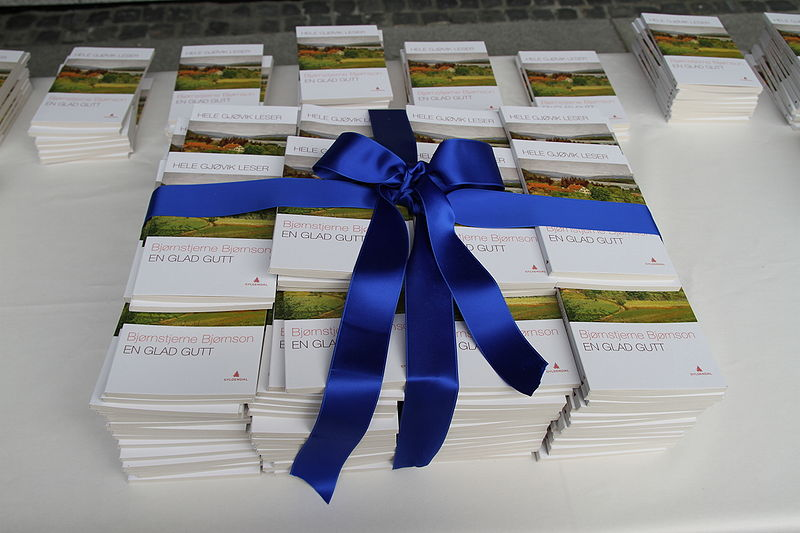
"A Happy Boy" by Bjørnstjerne Bjørnson

En glad Gut (A Happy Boy) is a novel published in 1860 by the Norwegian writer Bjørnstjerne Bjørnson. It is one of his peasant novels.

== Plot ==
The main character, Øyvind Plassen, is a cotter's son that eventually wins a foothold in life, and thereby also his beloved Marit, a farm girl, through education at an agricultural school. Alongside the two and their parents, the story also develops the character of Øyvind's older friend and adviser Bård, the schoolmaster, in particular.

== Reception ==
Edvard Beyer wrote in Norges litteraturhistorie (Norway's Literary History) that "The story has a lyrical feel, especially the scenes from childhood. Bård the schoolmaster is one of Bjørnson's finest portrayals. However, his depiction of the protagonist is not as developed as in Arne, and the last chapters are marked by haste. ... The critics had many words of praise, and with its cheerful tone and simple message—Løft ditt hode, du raske gutt! 'Lift your head, you restless youth!' and Elsk din neste, du kristensjel 'Love your neighbor, you Christian soul'—A Happy Boy is perhaps the most beloved of all of Bjørnson's stories."

== Film adaptation ==
En glad gutt was filmed in 1932 to mark the centenary of Bjørnson's birth. Tore Foss played the lead role as Øyvind. This was one of the first sound films in Norway.
