= William Morton Payne =

American educator, literary critic and writer

William Morton Payne (February 14, 1858, Newburyport – 1919) was an American educator, literary critic and writer.

== Biography ==
Payne was the son of Henry Morton Payne, a cotton-mill machinery manufacturer in Newburyport, Massachusetts, and Emma Tilton. In 1868 his family moved to Chicago, Illinois, where he continued his education. From 1874 to 1876 he was an assistant librarian in Chicago Public Library, and from 1876 to 1909 a Chicago high school instructor, teaching economics, civil government and American history. He worked as literary editor of the Chicago Morning News (1884–88) and then the Chicago Evening Journal (1888–92). In 1892 he became an associate editor for The Dial. As well as writing for The Dial, Payne wrote for The Forum, The Bookman, Harper's Weekly, The Atlantic Monthly, Music, The New England Magazine, and The International Monthly. Between 1900 and 1904 he lectured on English literature at Wisconsin. Kansas and Chicago universities. He was unmarried.

Payne's literary criticism treated modern literature, especially poetry, in English, French, German, Italian, and the languages of Scandinavia. He translated (1888) Bjørnstjerne Bjørnson's historical trilogy Sigurd Slembe and (1895) Henrik Bernhard Jæger's biography of Henrik Ibsen from Norwegian.

== Works ==
- The New Education, 1884
- Little Leaders, 1895
- (ed.) English in American Universities, 1895
- (ed.) American Literary Criticism, 1904
- The Greater English Poets of the Nineteenth Century, 1907
- Leading American Essayists, 1910
