= Aulestad =

- Established: 1935
- Location: Follebu, Innlandet, Norway
- Coordinates: 61°13′02″N 10°15′57″E

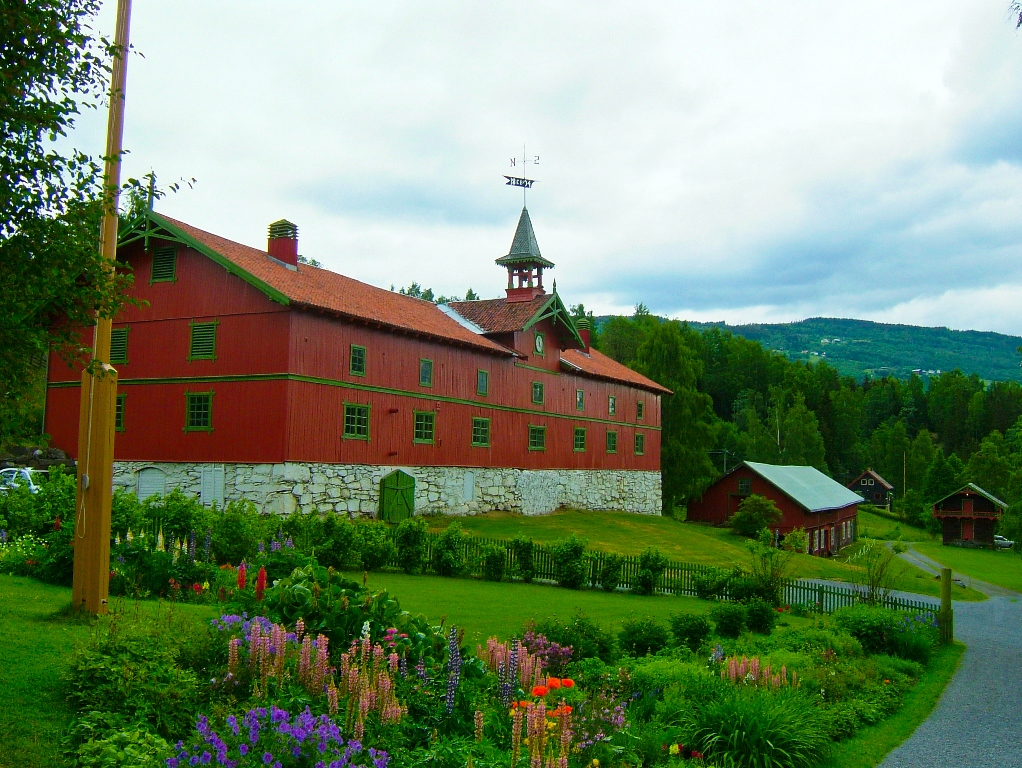
Barn at Aulestad

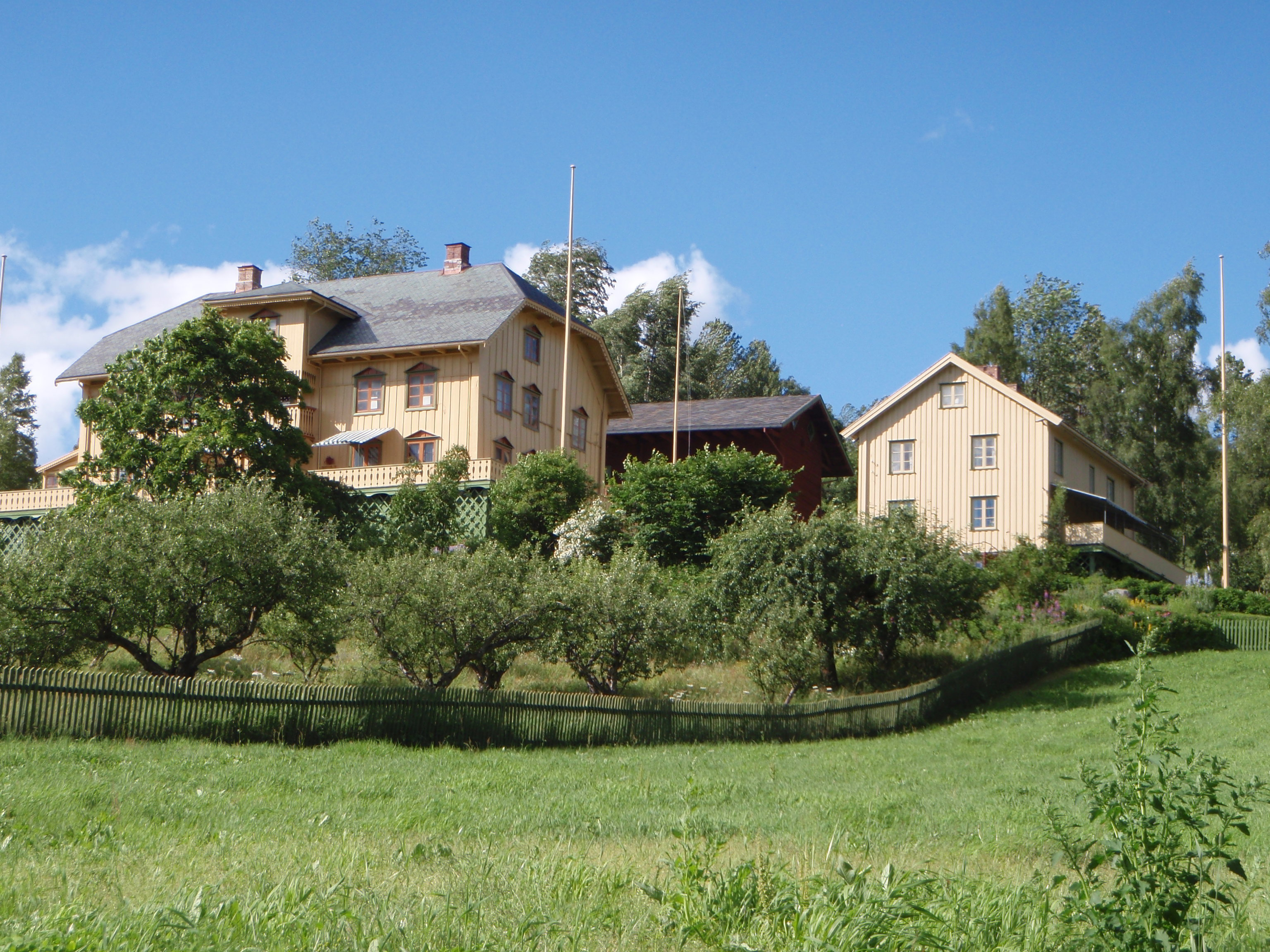
Residence at Aulestad

Aulestad is a farm and writer's house museum in Follebu in Innlandet county, Norway. It is located along County Road Fv255 (Bjørnsonvegen) between Vinstra and Hovemoen.

The farm is best known as the former residence of Karoline and Bjørnstjerne Bjørnson. Nobel Laureate Bjørnstjerne Bjørnson lived here with his family from 1875 until his death in 1910. The farm is still owned by members of the Bjørnson family.

The manor was added to The Sandvig Collections at Lillehammer after Karoline Bjørnson's death in 1934. In 1935 Aulestad opened as a museum. It serves as a museum of Bjørnstjerne Bjørnson's life and work. Since 2011. Aulestad has been part of the Lillehammer museum which operates Maihaugen, together with the Norwegian Olympic Museum and Bjerkebæk, the former home of author Sigrid Undset.
