= Gina Oselio =

Norwegian opera singer (1858–1937)

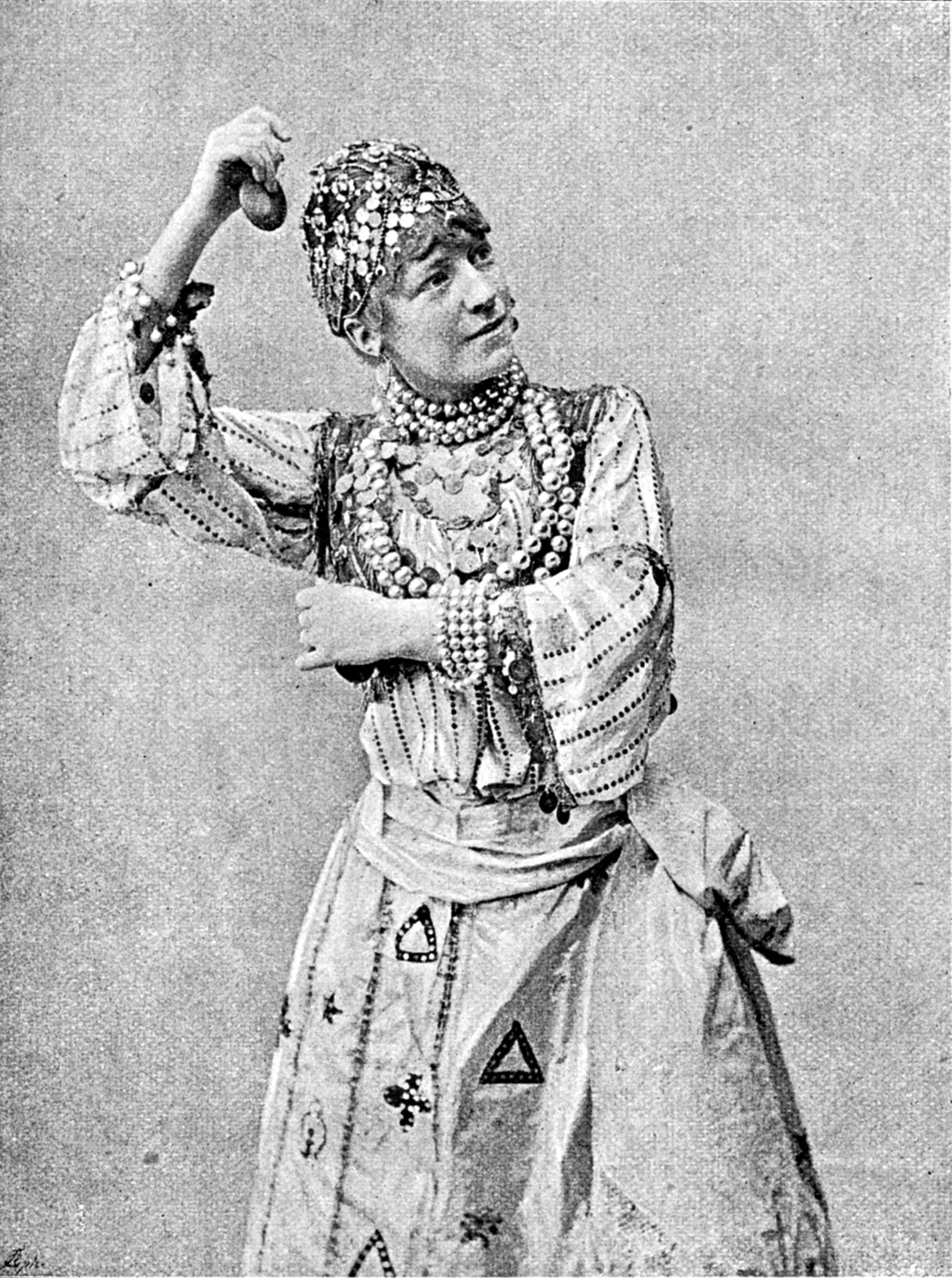
- Gina Oselio as Carmen in 1891.
- Born: Ingeborg Mathilde Laura Aas; 19 November 1858; Christiania, Norway
- Died: 4 May 1937 (aged 78); Oslo, Norway
- Occupation: Operatic singer
- Spouse: Bjørn Bjørnson (m. 1893; dissolved 1909)

Gina Oselio (19 November 1858 – 4 May 1937) was a Norwegian operatic mezzo-soprano. Her signature role was the title heroine in Georges Bizet's Carmen. Oselio was sponsored by Oscar II who he gave her the title of "hofsangerinde", and she was the only Norwegian person to receive the honour.

== Early and personal life ==
Oselio was born in Christiania as Ingeborg Mathilde Laura Aas on 19 November 1858, and was the youngest daughter of saddle maker Even Pedersen Aas and Nicoline Engelstad. She married actor and theatre director Bjørn Bjørnson in 1893, but he left her in 1907 and the marriage was officially dissolved in 1909.

== Career ==
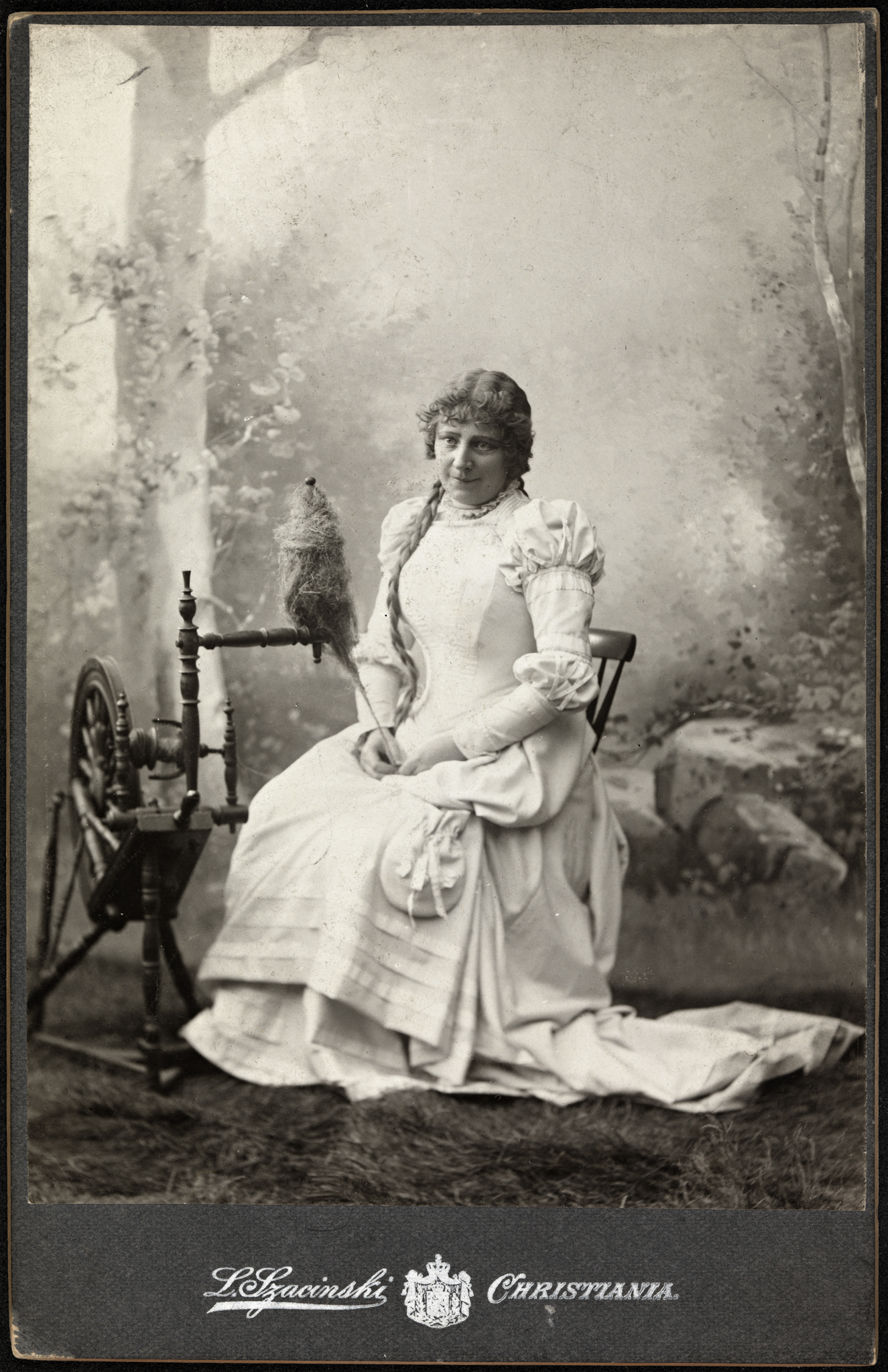
Gina Oselio as Marguerite in Faust c. 1890

Her talent for singing was discovered by actress Johanne Juell and Oselio began to study singing in her native country with Fritz Arlberg beginning when she was 17, and with Fredrika Stenhammar in Sweden from 1877. She made her professional opera debut on 11 December 1879 as Leonora in Gaetano Donizetti's La favorite at the Royal Swedish Opera. The next year, she impressed Oscar II of Sweden and Norway with her performance of Ortrud in Wagner's Lohengrin so much that he sponsored her studies in Paris with Mathilde Marchesi, as well as bestowing the title of "hofsangerinde" on her, becoming the only Norwegian person to hold the title.

After her education finished in Paris, she performed in several guest roles at Italian opera houses as well as touring all across Italy and other European countries. It was in that she began using the stage name Gina Oselio.

Oselio was played Margrethe in Charles Gounod's Faust in 1890 and the as the titular role in Carmen both at the Christiania Theatre and they were two of her favourite roles. However, Oselio regularly suffered from bronchitis during the 1890s and a major abdominal surgery in 1903 limited her stage performances.

== Later life and death ==
In 1902, she was awarded the Oscar II medal. Oselio was also named an honorary member of the Norsk Operasangerforbund and was a recipient of the Litteris et Artibus and the French Officier de l'Instruction Publique. From 1929, she began receiving the state's artist salary.

In 1917, she underwent a tour to celebrate her 40th anniversary as a singer, She was praised for her performances in Christiania. However, composer Sverre Jordan, who accompanied Oselio during her performance in Bergen, recalled how she struggled through the repertoire with tears in her eyes. He said "It's always sad when a great artist outlives herself and can't renounce the podium and the audience in time". Oselio died on 4 May 1937 in Oslo, at the age of 78.

== Sources ==
- Biography of Gina Oselio
