= Karoline Bjørnson =

Norwegian actress

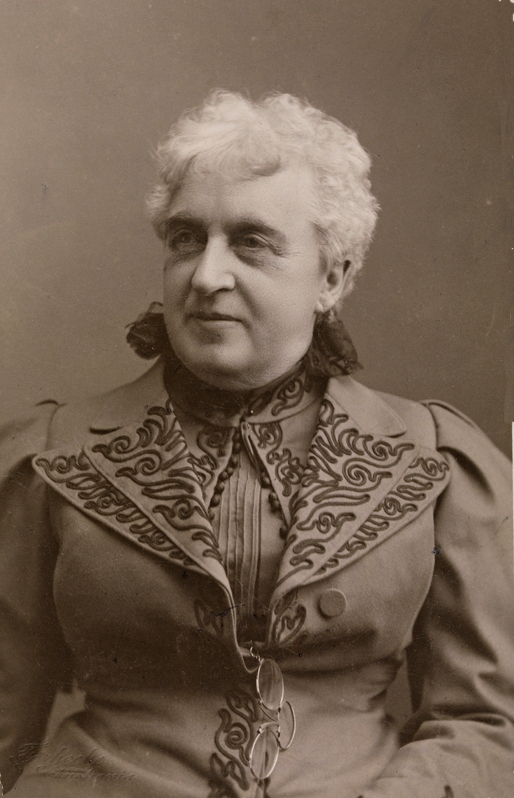
Karoline Bjørnson

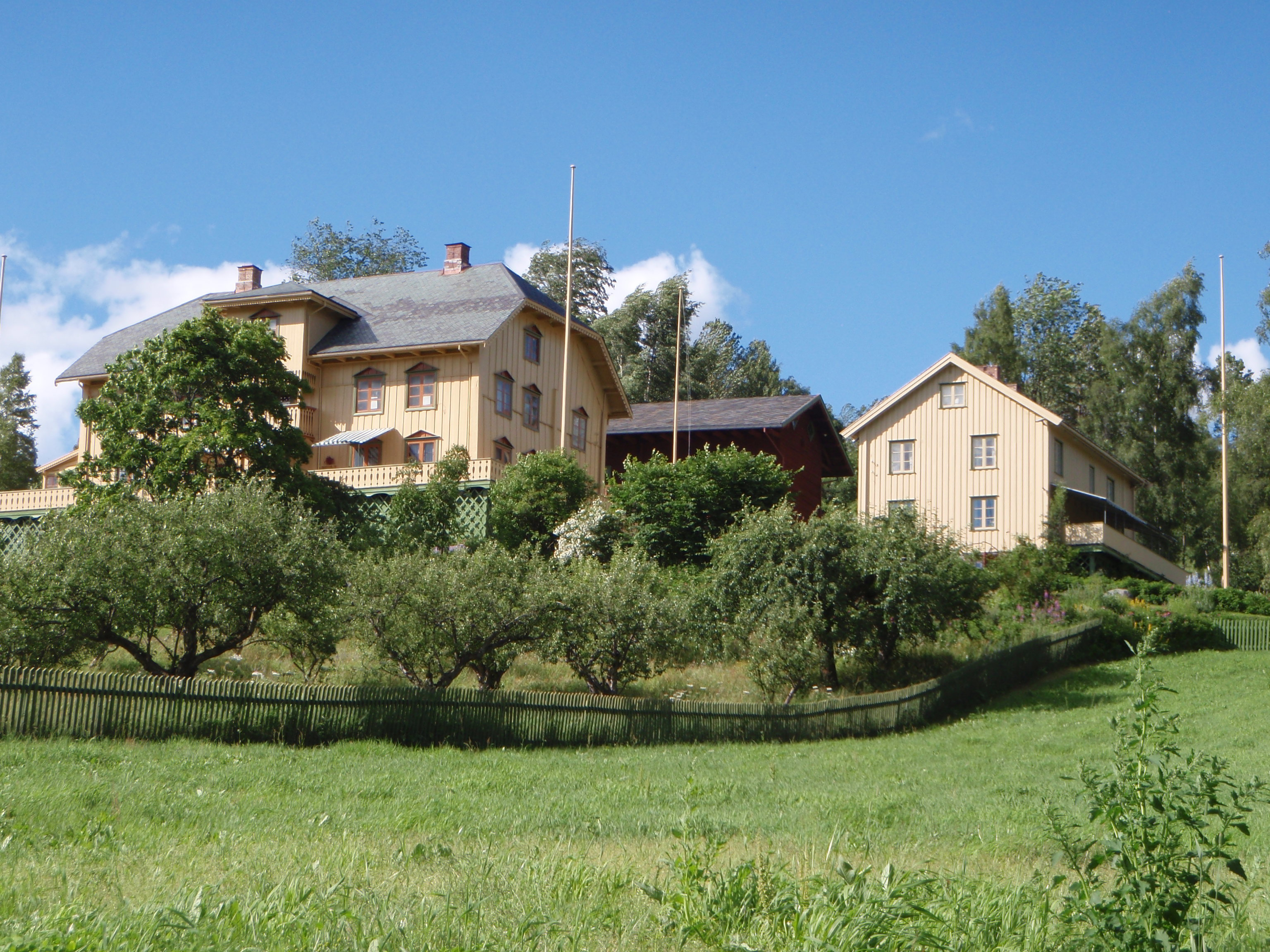
Aulestad in Oppland

Karoline Bjørnson (née Reimers, 1 December 1835 – 27 June 1934) was a Norwegian actress. She is best known as the wife and supporter of poet, playwright, popular speaker and Nobel laureate Bjørnstjerne Bjørnson.

== Biography ==
Karoline Johanne Elisabeth Reimers was born at Etne in Hordaland and grew up in Bergen, Norway. She was the daughter of Rasmus Helt Reimers (1801–1884) and Marie Jahn (1806–1841). The Reimers and Jahn families had originally immigrated from Germany. She became a student at the Kristiania norske Theater from 1854. In 1858 she was given a role in a play at Det Norske Theater in Bergen, and then joined the theater on a tour to Trondheim. She was married to Bjørnstären Bjørnson from 1858 and to his death in 1910. She was the model for several of Bjørnson's literary women figures, and helping out with articles and other literary works. The figures "Klara Sang" and "Tora Parsberg" are modelled after her. Several of Bjørnson's poems are dedicated to his wife Karoline.

She was the mother of six children, five of whom lived to adulthood:

- Bjørn Bjørnson (1859–1942)
- Einar Bjørnson (1864–1942)
- Erling Bjørnson (1868–1959)
- Bergliot Ibsen (1869–1953)
- Dagny Bjørnson (1871–1872)
- Dagny Bjørnson (1876–1974)

She died at Aulestad the family estate in Follebu, Oppland at 98 years old.

The painting of Bjørnstjerne and Karoline Bjørnson by Eyolf Soot (1859–1928) from 1897 is located in the National Gallery of Norway. She was portrayed by Bernhard Folkestad (1879–1933) in 1912, and by Olaf Gulbransson (1873–1958) in 1923. She was the subject of a biography by author Øyvind Anker (1904–1989) in his book Boken om Karoline (Oslo: Aschehoug, 1982).
