= Eva Lund Haugen =

American author, editor and translator (1907–1996)

Eva Lund Haugen (February 4, 1907 – October 25, 1996) was an American writer, editor and translator.

== Biography ==
Eva Lund was born at Kongsvinger in Hedmark county, Norway. She was twelve years old when her journalist parents emigrated to the United States in 1919. The family moved to Decorah, Iowa in 1927, where both parents worked for the Norwegian-American newspaper, Decorah-Posten. Her father, Einar Lund (1880–1963) was editor of the newspaper from 1946 to 1962.

She attended the University of Illinois in 1930–1931. She received her B.A. degree from the University of Wisconsin–Madison. In 1932, she married American linguist Einar Haugen with whom she was author, co-editor or translator of several books. Separately, she was author and translator of several published works relating to Norwegian-American heritage. She is most associated with her work as translator and editor in connection with works of Norwegian writer and Nobel Prize laureate, Bjørnstjerne Bjørnson.

The Einar and Eva Lund Haugen Memorial Scholarship has been established to honor both Eva Lund Haugen and her husband, Einar Haugen.

== Selected bibliography ==
- Land of the Free: Bjornstjerne Bjornson's America Letters (Norwegian American Historic Association., Northfield, MN. 1978)
- Peder Anderson of Bergen and Lowell : Artist and Ambassador of Culture (Norwegian-American Studies, Oslo 1973)
- Bibliography of Scandinavian Dictionaries (Kraus International, White Plains, New York, March 1985)
- An Editor Chooses America: The Story of Einar Lund. (Norse Heritage Volume II, 58–72. Norwegian Emigration Center, 1991)
