= En fallit =

1875 play by Norwegian playwright Bjørnstjerne Bjørnson

- Written by: Bjørnstjerne Bjørnson
- Original language: Norwegian
- Genre: Romantic

Premiere
- Date premiered: 1875
- Place premiered: Sweden, Stockholm

En fallit ("The Bankrupt") is a play by Norwegian playwright Bjørnstjerne Bjørnson that was published in 1875 in Copenhagen. The play was partially written in Rome, and has a theme that was new for the Scandinavians, because the dramatist had to deal with tragicomedy of money, and, while making a forcible plea for honesty to contrive to produce a stirring and entertaining play on what might seem so prosaic a foundation as business finance. The play was actually first performed in a Swedish translation, at Stockholm, a few days before it was produced at Christiania. After that the play also reached Berlin, Munich, Vienna, and other German and Austrian theaters. It was played in Paris, at the Théâtre Libre in 1894.

The character of Berent, the lawyer, which became a favorite one with the famous Swedish actor Ernst Possart, was admittedly more or less of a portrait of a well-known Norwegian lawyer, by name Dunker. When Bjørnson was writing the play, he went to stay for some days with Dunker, who was to instruct him as to the legal aspect of bankruptcy. Bjørnson took the opportunity of studying the lawyer as well as the law.

== Main characters ==
- Henning Tjælde, merchant and brewer.
- Mrs. Tjælde, his wife.
- Valborg – their daughter.
- Signe – their daughter.
- Lieutenant Hamar – engaged to Signe.
- Sannæs – Tjælde's confidential clerk.
- Jakobsen – manager of Tjælde's brewery.
- Berent – a lawyer.
- Pram – a custom-house official.
