= Arne (novel) =

1859 novel by Bjørnstjerne Bjørnson

Arne is a peasant novel by the Norwegian writer Bjørnstjerne Bjørnson. It is dedicated to Ole Bull. The year 1858 is printed on the title page of the first edition, but it was not issued until 1859. The book is distinguished by its realistic portrayal of mental life: minds that go astray, confinement, communication difficulties, unclear longings, and problems of conscience.

== Plot ==
The novel's protagonist, Arne Kampen, is the son of the hardworking cotter's daughter Margit and the disorderly master dancer and fiddler Nils Skrædder. Nils is obviously a frustrated artist, an unbalanced man that women are drawn to, deceitful, violent, and increasingly alcoholic. He eventually becomes both physically and mentally disabled. (This theme appears in other works by Bjørnson; for example, in the novel Thrond). Arne almost resorts to murder to protect his mother against his father. His father's legacy is difficult to bear. Arne has good reasons to yearn and leave, but his love for his mother, for his work to improve Kampen (a former cotter's farm), and for Eli Bøen, the girl who understands him and appreciates his songs, eventually lead him to settle down.

== Reception ==
The book received mixed reviews from critics. Aasmund Olavsson Vinje wrote ironically that he liked "the naked, breathless depiction of life's poverty" but found too much Raasmak og Raatev 'raw taste and raw smell' in it. Clemens Pedersen thought that Arne probably testified to a more developed talent than Synnøve Solbakken, but he was still not so much captivated by it, whereas Georg Brandes found that Arne was the most interesting of Bjørnson's peasant tales.
