= Bergliot Ibsen =

Norwegian mezzo-soprano singer

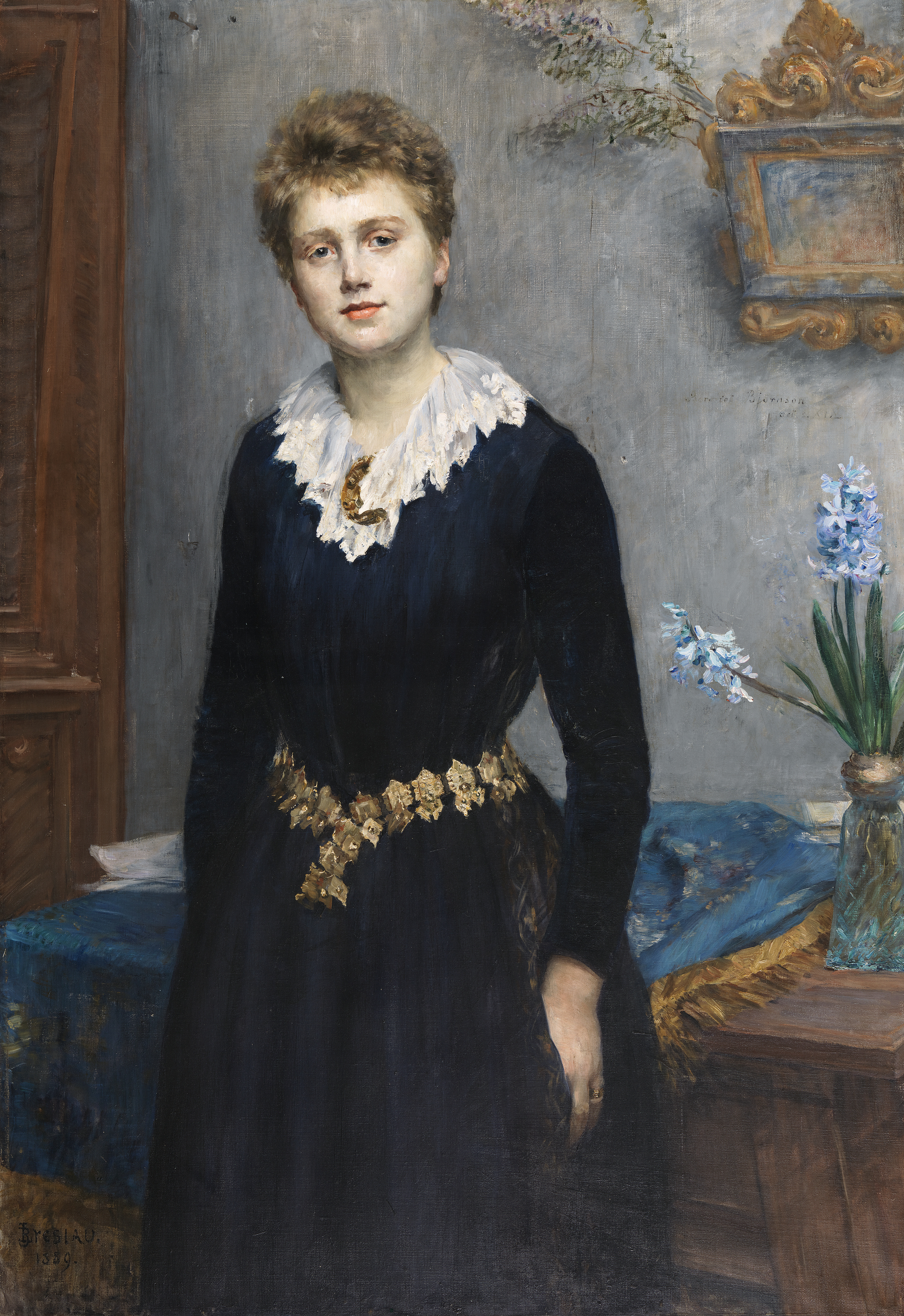
- Born: Bergliot Bjørnson; 10 June 1869; Christiania, Norway
- Died: 2 February 1953 (aged 83); Bolzano, Italy
- Resting place: Vår Frelsers gravlund, Oslo
- Occupation: Mezzo-soprano singer
- Spouse: Sigurd Ibsen (m. 1892; died 1930)
- Children: Tancred Ibsen; Irene Ibsen Bille
- Parents: Bjørnstjerne Bjørnson (father); Karoline Bjørnson (mother)
- Relatives: Henrik Ibsen (father-in-law); Suzannah Ibsen (mother-in-law)

Bergliot Ibsen (née Bjørnson; 10 June 1869 – 2 February 1953) was a Norwegian mezzo-soprano singer.

== Biography ==
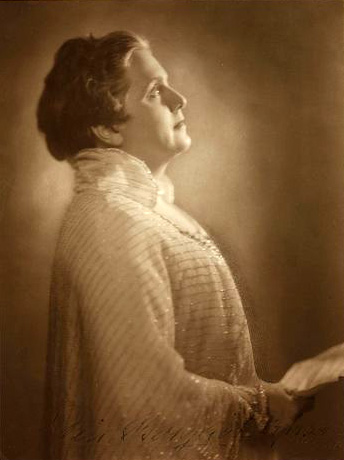
portrait from National Library of Norway

She was born Bergliot Bjørnson in Christiania (now Oslo, Norway) as the daughter of writer and Nobel Prize in Literature laureate Bjørnstjerne Bjørnson and Karoline Bjørnson (née Reimers). She was married to politician Sigurd Ibsen (1859–1930), son of playwright Henrik Ibsen and Suzannah Ibsen. Her husband later became Norwegian Prime Minister in Stockholm. They were the parents of Tancred Ibsen, Eleonora Borberg and Irene Ibsen Bille.

Bergliot Ibsen made her concert début in Paris in 1880, and later toured in Norway and Denmark. In 1948 she published the memoir book De tre on the three Ibsens: Henrik, Suzannah and Sigurd.

She died in Bolzano, Italy in 1953. She was buried in Oslo at Æreslunden in Vår Frelsers gravlund.
