= Peder Bjørnson =

Norwegian priest

Peder Elias Bjørnson (1798–1871) was a Norwegian priest, best known for being the father of Bjørnstjerne Bjørnson.

Bjørnson was born in at the Skei farm in Søgne Municipality. He was of peasant stock and he married Inger Elise Nordraak (1808–1897) from Kragerø. He served as a priest in Kvikne Municipality, a secluded area in the Østerdalen district, some sixty miles south of Trondheim, from 1831 to 1838, and it is here that his son was born on December 8, 1832 and given the unusual name Bjørnstjern. Kvikne had a violent reputation, but Bjørnson succeeded in introducing compulsory education and subduing the local opposition to religious authority. On April 11, 1838, Bjørnson was transferred with his family to the parish of Nesset, outside Molde in Romsdal county when Bjørnstjern was six years old. They lived at the Nesset Parsonage and it was there that his son modified his own name to Bjørnstjerne. The family remained in Nesset for 14 years.

Bjørnson was appointed parish priest of Søgne Municipality on September 18, 1852, and served there until 1869. In 1858, he presided over the marriage of his son at the old church in Søgne, whereupon he wrote in the parish records: "Marriage, September 11: The student and theater director Bjørnstjerne Martinius Bjørnson married the single girl Johanne Elisabet Caroline Reimers."

In addition to Bjørnstjerne, Bjørnson's children included Mathilde Cathinka (born in 1834), Petter Elias (born April 25, 1838, father of Inga Bjørnson), Carl F. (born in 1844), and Karoline Emilie (1841–1929), who was mother of the historian of religion William Brede Kristensen.

Bjørnson died in Kristiania (now Oslo) and was buried at Our Savior's Cemetery.
