= Erling Bjørnson =

Norwegian politician

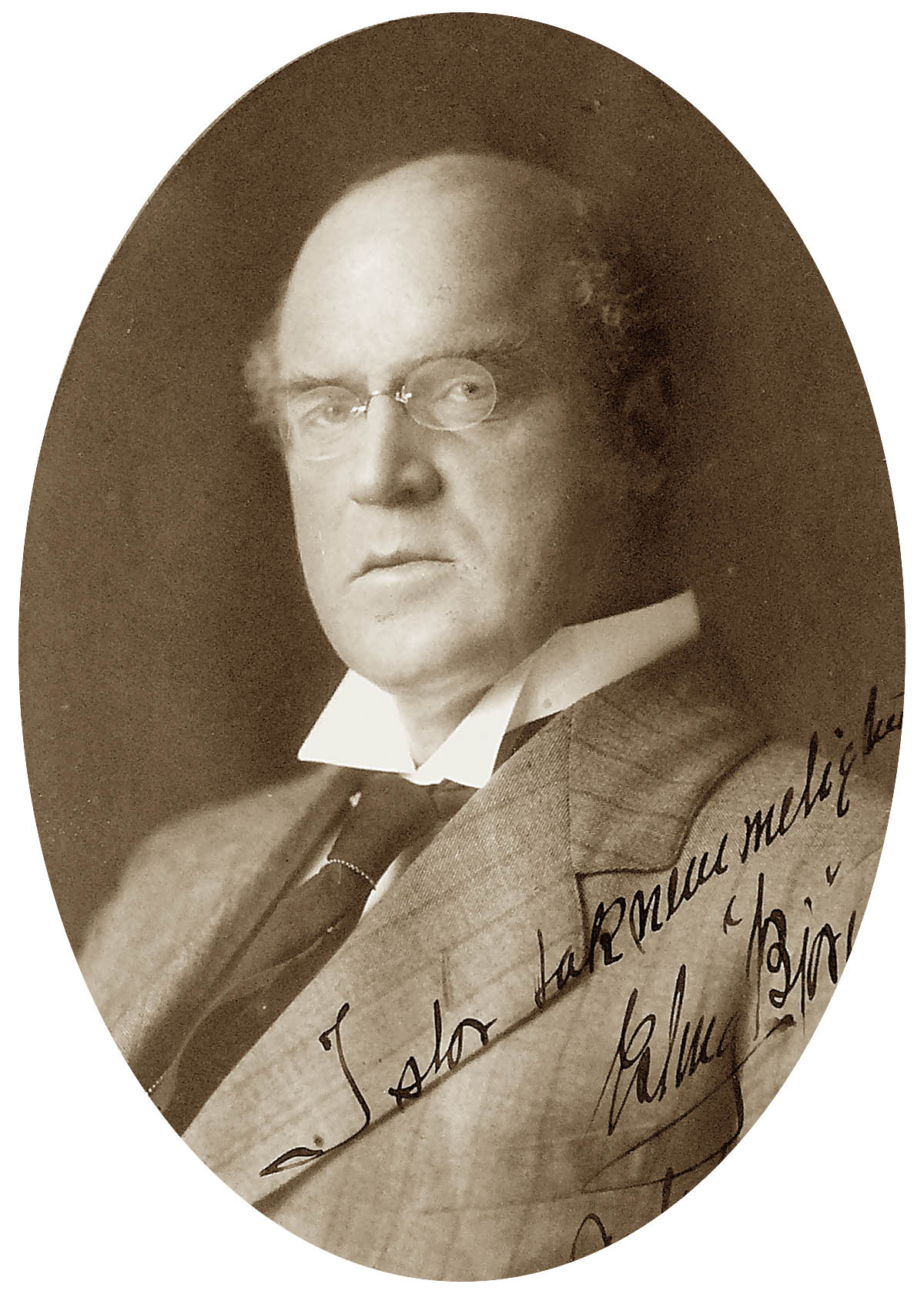
Erling Bjørnson

Erling Bjørnson (19 April 1868 – 7 December 1959) was a Norwegian farmer and politician for the Agrarian Party and later Nasjonal Samling.

He was born in Copenhagen, the son of Karoline and Bjørnstjerne Bjørnson. He was elected to the Parliament of Norway in 1933 from the constituency Oppland, and was re-elected in 1936.
