= Bjørnstjerne Bjørnson =

Norwegian writer (1832–1910)

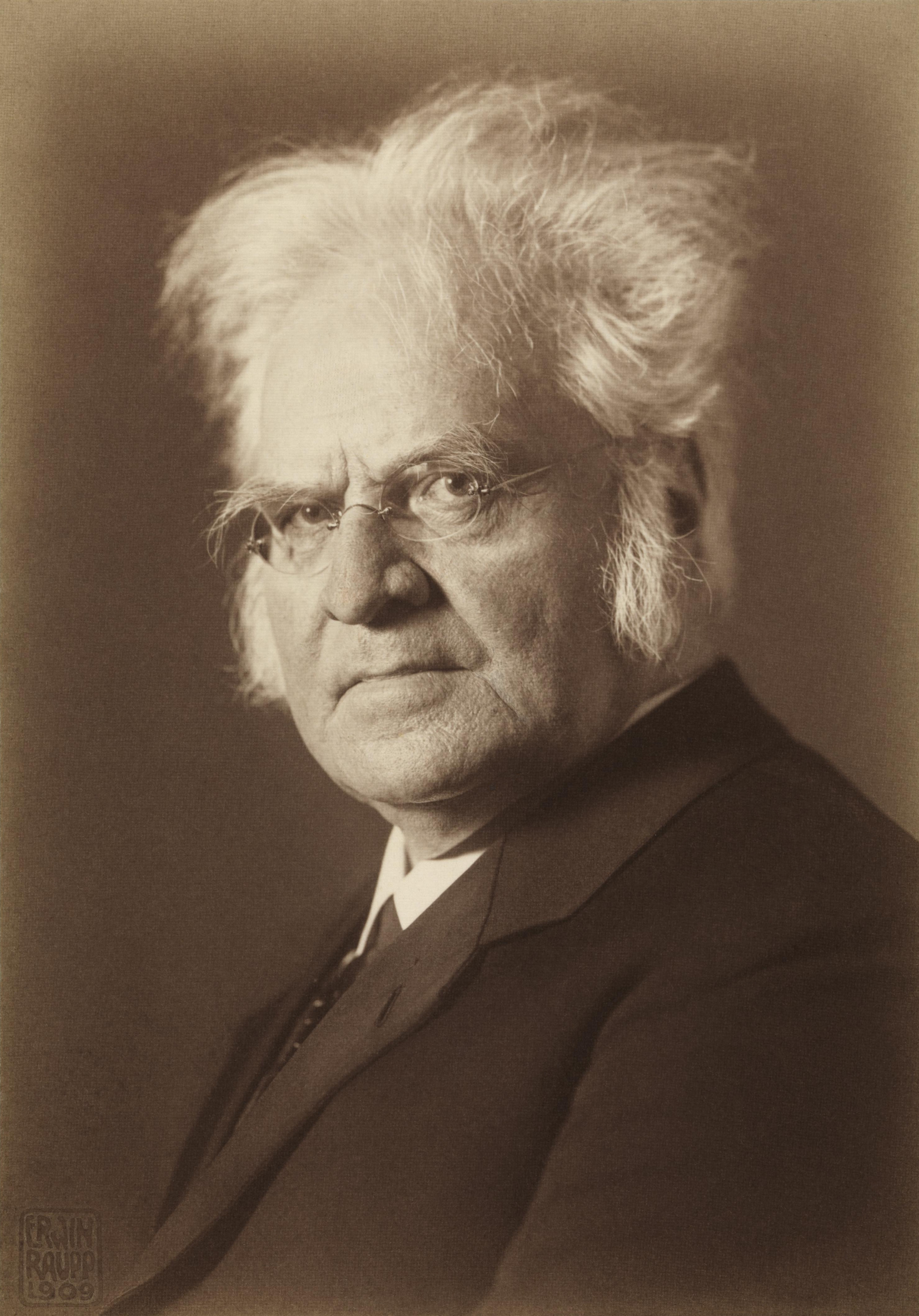
- Bjørnson in 1909
- Born: Bjørnstjerne Martinius Bjørnson; 8 December 1832; Kvikne, Sweden-Norway
- Died: 26 April 1910 (aged 77); Paris, French Third Republic
- Occupations: Poet, novelist, playwright, lyricist
- Spouse: Karoline Reimers
- Children: Bjørn Bjørnson, Bergljot Ibsen, Erling Bjørnson
- Relatives: Peder Bjørnson (father), Elise Nordraak (mother), Maria Björnson (great-granddaughter)
- Writing career
- Notable awards: Nobel Prize in Literature; 1903

Signature
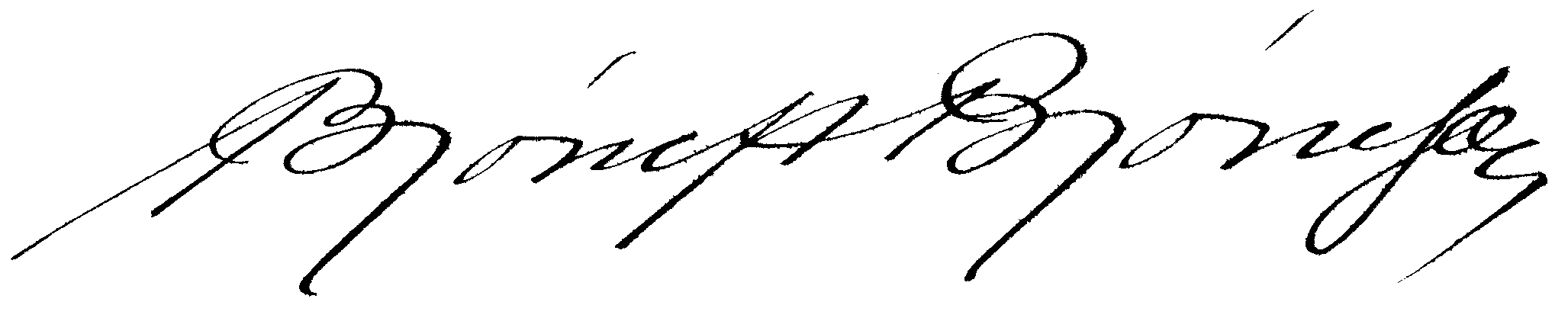

Bjørnstjerne Martinius Bjørnson (/ˈbjɜːrnsən/ BYURN-sən; Norwegian: [ˈbjø̂ːɳstjæːɳə mɑrˈtiːnɪʉ̂s ˈbjø̂ːɳsɔn]; 8 December 1832 – 26 April 1910) was a Norwegian writer who received the 1903 Nobel Prize in Literature "as a tribute to his noble, magnificent and versatile poetry, which has always been distinguished by both the freshness of its inspiration and the rare purity of its spirit". The first Norwegian Nobel laureate, he was a prolific polemicist and extremely influential in Norwegian public life and Scandinavian cultural debate. Bjørnson is considered to be one of "the four greats" of Norwegian literature, alongside Ibsen, Lie, and Kielland. He is also celebrated for his lyrics to the Norwegian national anthem, "Ja, vi elsker dette landet". The composer Fredrikke Waaler based a composition for voice and piano (Spinnersken) on a text by Bjørnson, as did Anna Teichmüller (Die Prinzessin).

== Childhood and education ==
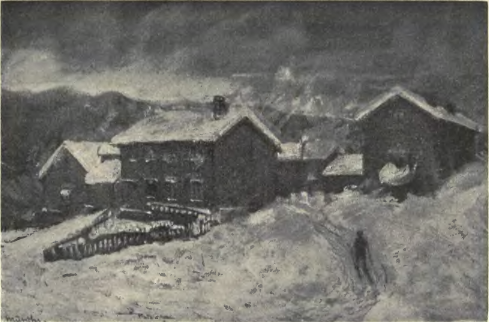
Bjørgan farmyard in Kvikne. Drawing by Gerhard Munthe

Bjørnson was born at the farmstead of Bjørgan in Kvikne, a secluded village in the Østerdalen district, some 60 miles (97 km) south of Trondheim. In 1837, Bjørnson's father Peder Bjørnson, who was the pastor of Kvikne Municipality, was transferred to the parish of Nesset Municipality, outside Molde in Romsdal. It was in this scenic district that Bjørnson spent his childhood, living at the Nesset Parsonage.

After a few years studying in the neighbouring city Molde, Bjørnson was sent at the age of 17 to Heltberg Latin School (Heltbergs Studentfabrik) in Christiania to prepare for university. This was the same school that trained Ibsen, Lie, and Vinje.

Bjørnson had realized that he wanted to pursue his talent for poetry (he had written verses since age eleven). He matriculated at the University of Oslo in 1852, soon embarking upon a career as a journalist, focusing on criticism of drama.

== Early production ==
In 1857, Bjørnson published Synnøve Solbakken, the first of his peasant novels. In 1858, this was followed by Arne, in 1860 by En glad Gut (A Happy Boy), and in 1868 by Fiskerjenten (The Fisher Girl). These are the most important specimens of his bonde-fortellinger or peasant tales. At least seven Danish composers wrote music based on Arne: Morten Eskesen, C. J. Frydensberg, Peter Heise, Anton Nielsen, Oluf Ring, Henrik Rung, and Sigrid Henriette Wienecke.

Bjørnson was anxious "to create a new saga in the light of the peasant," as he put it, and he thought this should be done, not merely in prose fiction, but in national dramas or folke-stykker. The earliest of these was a one-act piece set in the 12th century, Mellem Slagene (Between the Battles), written in 1855 and produced in 1857. He was especially influenced at this time by the study of Jens Immanuel Baggesen and Adam Gottlob Oehlenschläger, during a visit to Copenhagen. Mellem Slagene was followed by Halte-Hulda (Lame Hulda) in 1858, and Kong Sverre (King Sverre) in 1861. His most important work to date was the poetic trilogy of Sigurd Slembe (Sigurd the Bad), which Bjørnson published in 1862.

== The mature author ==
At the close of 1857 Bjørnson had been appointed director of the theatre at Bergen, a post which he held for two years, when he returned to Christiania. From 1860 to 1863 he travelled widely throughout Europe. Early in 1865 he undertook the management of the Christiania Theatre, and brought out his popular comedy of De Nygifte (The Newly Married) and his romantic tragedy of Mary Stuart in Scotland. In 1870 he published Poems and Songs and the epic cycle Arnljot Gelline; the latter volume contains the ode Bergliot, one of Bjørnson's finest contributions to lyrical poetry.

Between 1864 and 1874, Bjørnson displayed a slackening of the intellectual forces very remarkable in a man of his energy; he was mainly occupied with politics and with his business as a theatrical manager. This was the period of Bjørnson's most fiery propaganda as a radical agitator. In 1871 he began to supplement his journalistic work by delivering lectures throughout Scandinavia.

From 1874 to 1876, Bjørnson was absent from Norway, and in the peace of voluntary exile he recovered his imaginative powers. His new departure as a dramatic author began with En fallit (A Bankruptcy) and Redaktøren (The Editor) in 1874, social dramas of an extremely modern and realistic cast.

== Collaborations with Grieg ==
In the 1870's Bjørnson and the composer Edvard Grieg, who shared his interests in Norwegian self-government, became friends. Grieg set several of his poems to music, including Landkjenning and Sigurd Jorsalfar. Eventually they decided on an opera based on King Olav Trygvason, but a dispute as to whether music or lyrics should be created first led to Grieg being diverted to working on incidental music for Henrik Ibsen's play Peer Gynt, which naturally offended Bjørnson. Eventually their friendship was resumed.

== The "national poet" ==
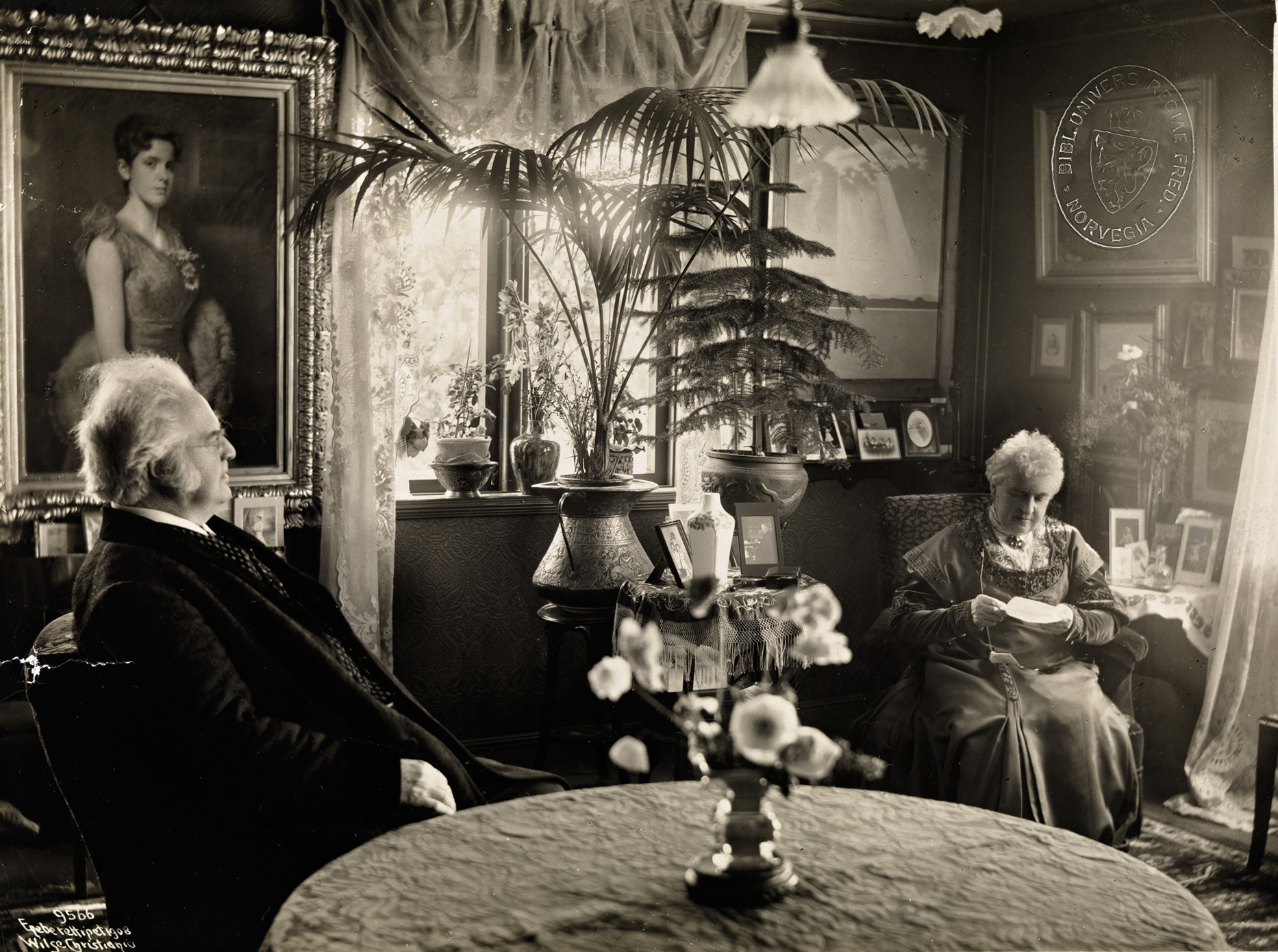
Bjørnstjerne Bjørnson and Karoline Bjørnson at Aulestad

Bjørnson settled on his estate of Aulestad in Gausdal Municipality. In 1877 he published another novel, Magnhild, in which his ideas on social questions were seen to be in a state of fermentation, and gave expression to his republican sentiments in the polemical play Kongen (The King). In a later edition of the play, he prefixed an essay on "Intellectual Freedom" in further explanation of his position. Kaptejn Mansana (Captain Mansana), an episode of the war of Italian independence, was written in to 1878.

Extremely anxious to obtain full success on the stage, Bjørnson concentrated his powers on a drama of social life, Leonarda (1879), which raised a violent controversy. A satirical play, Det nye System (The New System), was produced a few weeks later. Although these plays of Bjørnson's second period were greatly discussed, few were financially successful.

Bjørnson produced a social drama, En Handske (A Gauntlet), in 1883, but was unable to persuade any manager to stage it except in a modified form. In the autumn of the same year, Bjørnson published a mystical or symbolic drama, Over Ævne (Beyond Powers), dealing with the abnormal features of religious excitement with extraordinary force; this was not acted until 1899, when it achieved a great success.

== Political interests ==
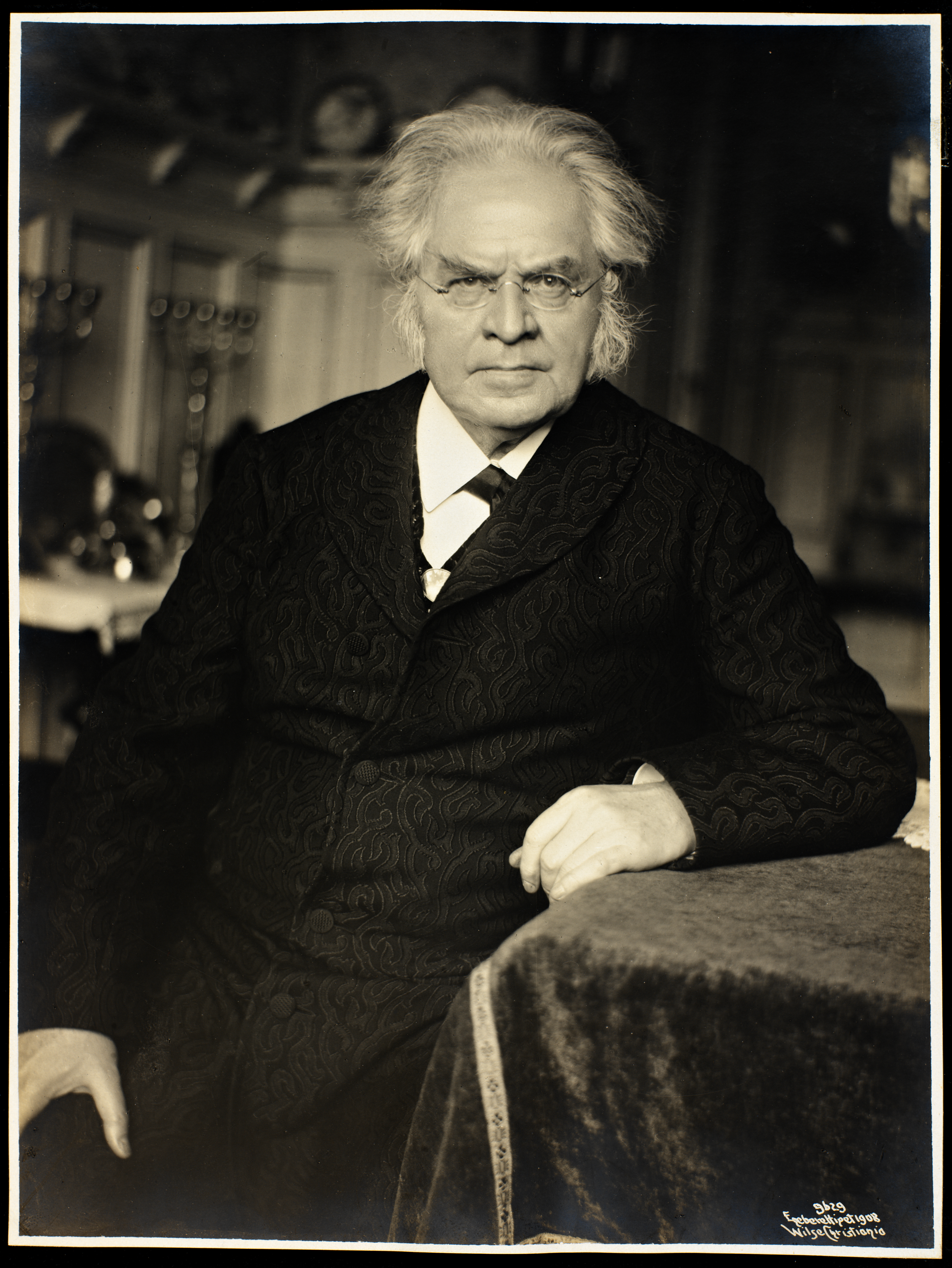
Bjørnstjerne Bjørnson in 1908

From his youth and forwards, Bjørnson admired Henrik Wergeland, and became a vivid spokesman for the Norwegian left-wing movement. In this respect, he supported Ivar Aasen, and joined forces in the political struggles in the 1860s and 1870s. When the great monument over Henrik Wergeland was to be erected in 1881, it came to political struggle between left and right, and the left wing got the upper hand. Bjørnson presented the speech on behalf of Wergeland, and also honouring the constitution and the farmers.

Bjørnson's political opinions had brought upon him a charge of high treason, and he took refuge for a time in Germany, returning to Norway in 1882. Convinced that the theatre was practically closed to him, he turned back to the novel, and published in 1884 Det flager i Byen og paa Havnen (Flags are Flying in Town and Port), embodying his theories on heredity and education. In 1889 he printed another long and still more remarkable novel, Paa Guds Veje (On God's Path), which is chiefly concerned with the same problems. The same year saw the publication of a comedy, Geografi og Kærlighed (Geography and Love), which met with success.

A number of short stories, of a more or less didactic character, dealing with startling points of emotional experience, were collected and published 1894. Later plays were a political tragedy called Paul Lange og Tora Parsberg (1898), a second part of Over Ævne (Beyond Powers II) (1895), Laboremus (1901), På Storhove (At Storhove) (1902), and Daglannet (Dag's Farm) (1904). In 1899, at the opening of the National Theatre, Bjørnson received an ovation, and his saga-drama of King Sigurd the Crusader was performed at the opening of Nationaltheatret in Oslo.

Bjørnson was one of the contributors of the anti-Union magazine Ringeren, edited by Sigurd Ibsen in 1898.

A subject which interested him greatly was the question of the bondemaal, the adopting of a national language for Norway distinct from the dansk-norsk (Dano-Norwegian), in which most Norwegian literature had hitherto been written. At an early stage, before 1860, Bjørnson had himself experimented with at least one short story written in landsmål. The interest, however, did not last, and he soon abandoned this enterprise altogether. Afterwards, he regretted that he never felt he gained the mastery of this language. Bjørnson's strong and sometimes rather narrow patriotism did not blind him to what he considered the fatal folly of such a proposal, and his lectures and pamphlets against the målstræv 'language strife' in its extreme form were very effective.

His attitude towards this must have changed sometime after 1881, as he still spoke on behalf of the farmers at this point. Although he seems to have been supportive of Ivar Aasen and friendly towards farmers (in the peasant novels), he later denounced this, and stated in 1899 that there was limits to a farmer's cultivation. "I can draw a line on the wall. The farmer can cultivate himself to this level, and no more", he wrote in 1899. Rumour has it that he had been insulted by a farmer at some point, and uttered the statement in sheer anger. In 1881, he spoke of the farmer's clothing borne by Henrik Wergeland, and his opinion then states that this garment, worn by Wergeland, was "of the most influential things" in the initiation of the national day. Bjørnson's attitude towards the farmers remain ambiguous. His father himself was a farmer's son. During the last twenty years of his life he wrote hundreds of articles in major European papers. He attacked the French justice in the Dreyfus Affair, and he fought for the rights of children in Slovakia to learn their own mother tongue. "To detach children from their mother tongue is identical to tearing them away from their mothers' breasts," he wrote.

Bjørnson wrote in multiple newspapers about the Černová massacre under the title The greatest industry of Hungary – which was supposedly "to produce Magyars".

He took part in the sexual morality debate (sedelighetsdebatten) of the time, arguing that free love did not allow for the development of positive traits such as self-restraint and a focus on virtue. Bjørnson held some 60 lectures in the Nordic countries on the issue; his strongly held views led to a rift with Georg Brandes.

== Last years ==
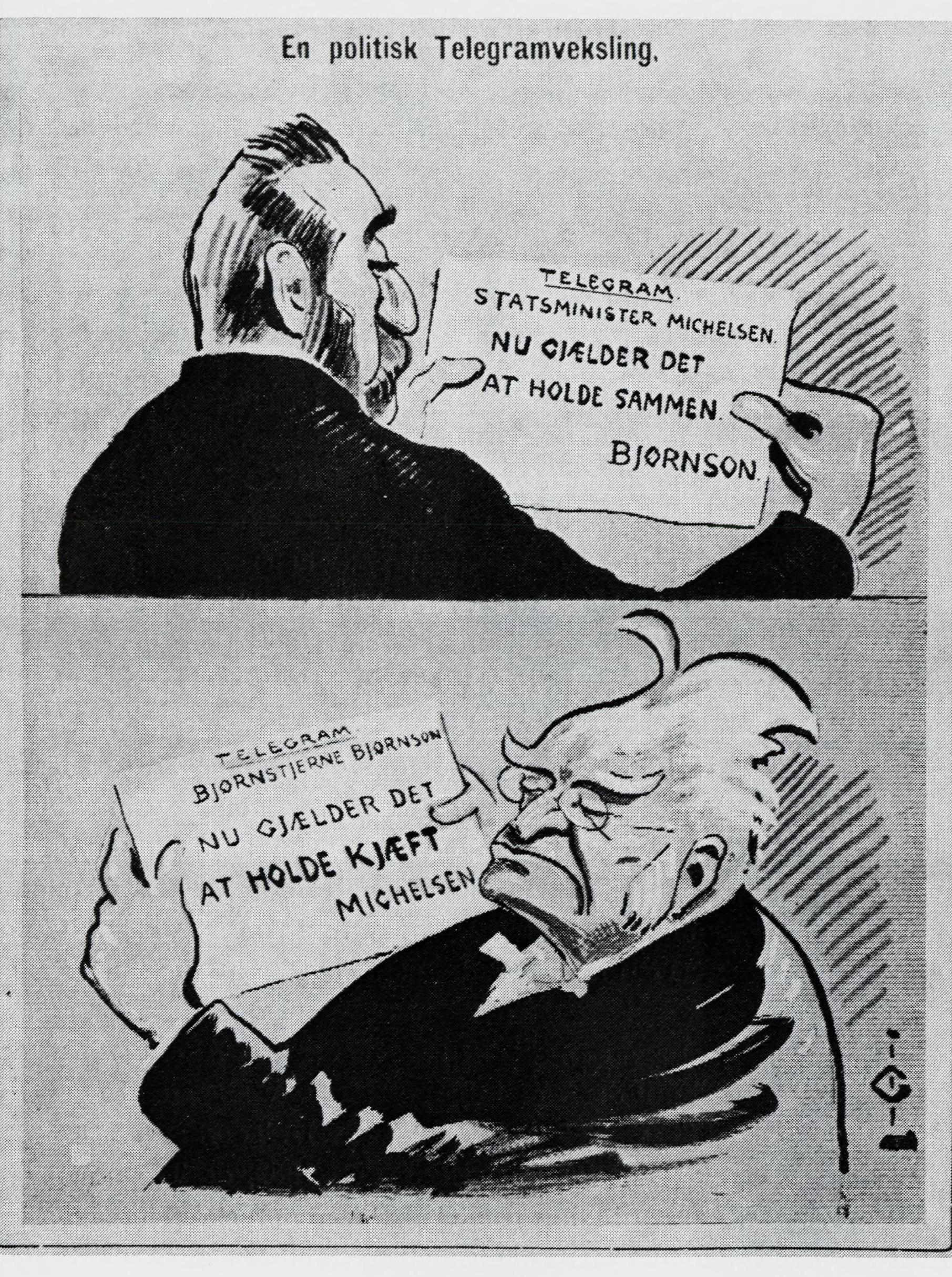
Illustration from Vikingen of a telegram exchange between Michelsen and Bjørnson.

Bjørnson was, from the beginning of the Dreyfus Affair, a staunch supporter of Alfred Dreyfus, and, according to a contemporary, wrote "article after article in the papers and proclaimed in every manner his belief in his innocence".

Bjørnson was one of the original members of the Norwegian Nobel Committee, that awards the Nobel Peace Prize, where he sat from 1901 to 1906. In 1903 he was awarded the Nobel Prize in Literature.

In 1901, Bjørnson proclaimed, "I'm a Pan-Germanist, I'm a Teuton, and the greatest dream of my life is for the South Germanic peoples and the North Germanic peoples and their brothers in diaspora to unite in a fellow confederation."

Bjørnson had done as much as any other man to rouse Norwegian nationalistic feeling, but in 1903, on the verge of the rupture between Norway and Sweden, he preached conciliation and moderation to the Norwegians. However, in 1905 he largely remained silent.

When Norway was attempting to dissolve the forced union with Sweden, Bjørnson sent a telegram to the Norwegian Prime minister stating, "Now is the time to unite." The minister replied, "Now is the time to shut up." This was in fact a satirical illustration published in Vikingen, but the story got so popular and widespread that Bjørnson had to deny it, claiming that "Michelsen has never asked me to shut up; it would not help if he did".

He died on 26 April 1910 in Paris, where for some years he had spent his winters, and was buried at home with every mark of honour. The Norwegian coastal defence ship HNoMS Norge was sent to convey his remains back to his own land.

== Family and relationships ==
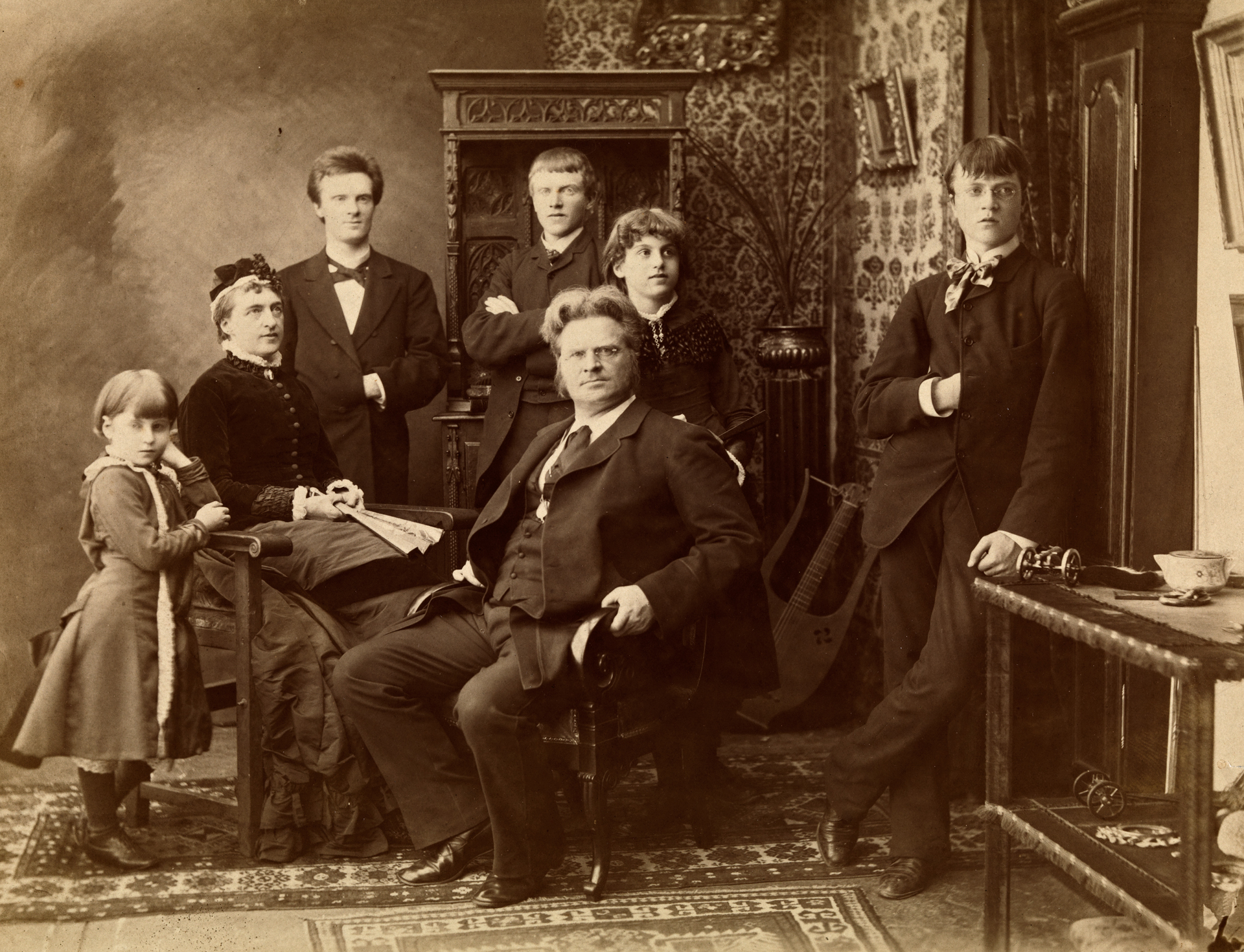
Bjørnstjerne Bjørnson and his family, 1882.

Bjørnson was the son of the Reverend Mr. Peder Bjørnson and Inger Elise Nordraach. He married Karoline Reimers (1835–1934) in 1858. They had six children, five of whom lived to adulthood: Bjørn Bjørnson (1859–1942), Einar Bjørnson (1864–1942), Erling Bjørnson (1868–1959), Bergliot Bjørnson (1869–1953), Dagny Bjørnson (1871–1872), Dagny Bjørnson (1876–1974).

In 1860, Bjørnson met and began an affair with Magda von Dolcke while he was in Denmark. Just two years after he had been married, his wife Karoline was in Norway at the time, recovering from a fever she had contracted after the birth of their first son in November 1859. Even after he returned to Norway, Bjørnson continued to exchange intimate letters with Dolcke and described their relationship as a "Pagt med en Sjel" (English: Pact with a Soul). His affair with Dolcke ended after he reconciled with Karoline in late 1861.

In his early fifties, Bjørnson had an affair with 17-year-old Guri Andersdotter (died 1949), which resulted in the birth of their son, Anders Underdal (1880–1973). The affair was kept a secret, though early on Anders Underdal, a poet, would talk about his origins with his children. Later in life he stopped discussing the matter, no reason was given. Anders was the father of Norwegian-Swedish author Margit Sandemo. Audun Thorsen has written a book about Bjørnson's affair, Bjørnsons kvinne og Margit Sandemos "familiehemmelighet" (lit. 'Bjørnson's woman and Margit Sandemo's 'family secret'') (Genesis forlag, Oslo 1999).

Karoline Bjørnson remained at Aulestad until her death in 1934.

== Bibliography ==
- Mellem Slagene, (Between the Battles) saga drama, 1857
- Synnøve Solbakken, peasant story, 1857
- Arne, 1859
- En glad Gut, (A Happy Boy) 1860
- Halte-Hulda, (Lame Hulda) 1858
- Kong Sverre, (King Sverre) 1861
- Sigurd Slembe, (Sigurd the Bad) 1862
- Maria Stuart i Skotland, (Mary Stuart in Scotland) 1863
- De Nygifte, (The Newly Married) 1865
- Fiskerjenten, 1868
- Arnljot Gelline, epic cycle 1870
- Digte og Sange, (Poems and Songs) 1880
- Brudeslåtten, peasant story, 1872
- Sigurd Jorsalfar, saga drama, 1872
- En fallit, (The Bankrupt) drama, 1875
- Redaktøren, (The Editor) drama, 1875
- Kaptejn Mansana, (Captain Mansana) novel, 1875
- Kongen, (The King) 1877
- Magnhild, 1877
- Det ny system, (The New System) 1879
- Leonarda, 1879
- En hanske (A Gauntlet), 1883
- Støv (Dust), 1882
- Over ævne, første stykke, (Beyond Human Power – I) 1883
- Det flager i byen og på havnen, (translated as "The Heritage of the Kurts") 1884
- På guds veje, (In God's Way) 1889
- Fred, oratorium, 1891
- Over ævne, annet stykke, (Beyond Human Power – II) 1895
- Paul Lange og Tora Parsberg, 1898
- Daglannet, 1904
- Når den ny vin blomstrer, (When the New Wine Blooms) 1909
- Norges Vel, cantata, 1909

== Sources ==
- Brandes, Georg (1899). Henrik Ibsen. Björnstjerne Björnson. Critical Studies. London: William Heinemann.
- Payne, William Morton (1910). Björnstjerne Björnson, 1832–1910. Chicago: A.C. McClurg & Co.
- Collin, Christen (1907). Bjørnstjerne Bjørnson hans Barndom og Ungdom. Kristiania: H. Aschehoug & Co.
- Larson, Harold (1944). Bjørnstjerne Bjørnson: A Study in Norwegian Nationalism. New York: King's Crown Press.
- Haugen, Eva Lund; and Einar Haugen (1978). Bjørnson: Land of the Free. Bjørnstjerne Bjørnson's American Letters 1880–1881. Northfield, Minn.: Norwegian-American Historical Association.
- Haugen, Einar (1978). The Vocabulary of Bjørnson's Literary Works. N.Y.: Columbia University Press.
- Amdam, Per (1978). Bjørnstjerne Bjørnson. J.W. Cappelen.
