= Einar Haugen =

Norwegian-American sociolinguist (1906–1994)

- Born: Einar Ingvald Haugen; April 19, 1906; Sioux City, Iowa, U.S.
- Died: June 20, 1994 (aged 88); Cambridge, Massachusetts, U.S.
- Spouse: Eva Lund Haugen (m. 1932)

Academic background
- Education: University of Illinois at Urbana-Champaign, Ph.D.

Academic work
- Discipline: Linguist
- Institutions: University of Wisconsin–Madison; Harvard University

Einar Ingvald Haugen (/ˈhaʊɡən/; April 19, 1906 – June 20, 1994) was a Norwegian-American linguist and writer known for his influential work in American sociolinguistics and Norwegian-American studies, including Old Norse studies.

Haugen was a professor at University of Wisconsin–Madison and Harvard University. He also served as president of the Linguistic Society of America, the American Dialect Society, and the Society for the Advancement of Scandinavian Study. Haugen was also a member of the Board of Editors of the Norwegian-American Historical Association. In 1972 he was awarded an honorary degree, doctor philos. honoris causa, at the Norwegian Institute of Technology, later part of the Norwegian University of Science and Technology.

== Early life and education ==
Haugen was born in Sioux City, Iowa, to Norwegian immigrants from Oppdal Municipality in Trøndelag county, Norway. When he was a young child, the family moved back to Oppdal for a few years, but then returned to the United States. He attended Morningside College in Sioux City but transferred to St. Olaf College to study with Ole Edvart Rølvaag. He earned his B.A. in 1928 and immediately went on to graduate studies in Scandinavian languages under professor George T. Flom at the University of Illinois at Urbana-Champaign, where he was awarded the Ph.D. in 1931.

== Career ==
In 1931, Haugen joined the faculty of the University of Wisconsin–Madison. He would spend more than thirty years in Madison, finally leaving in 1962 to accept a position at Harvard University. Before his departure, he recruited Norwegian scholar and Hamsun expert Harald Næss to Wisconsin to serve as his successor.

At Harvard, Haugen was made Victor S. Thomas Professor of Scandinavian and Linguistics and remained on faculty until his retirement in 1975.

Perhaps his most important work was The Norwegian language in America: A Study in Bilingual Behavior (ISBN 0-253-34115-9). In addition to several important works within these fields, he wrote the authoritative work on the dialect of his ancestral home of Oppdal and a book entitled The Ecology of Language, with which he pioneered a new field of linguistics later called Ecolinguistics. Within the field of sociolinguistics, he is well-known for his four-stage model of standardization: 1) selection, 2) codification, 3) elaboration, 4) acceptance. Einar Haugen also wrote Norwegian English Dictionary/Norsk engelsk ordbok (ISBN 0-299-03874-2). His last book was a biography of the Norwegian virtuoso violinist Ole Bull co-written with his daughter, Camilla Cai.

== Memorials ==
The Einar and Eva Lund Haugen Memorial Scholarship has been established by the Norwegian-American Historical Association to honor Einar Haugen and his wife Eva Lund Haugen (1907–1996). Additionally, the Boston Chapter of the American-Scandinavian Foundation voted to establish the Einar and Eva Haugen Prize. The prize is awarded annually to an undergraduate or graduate student for excellence in the field of Scandinavian languages and literature at Harvard University.

== Selected bibliography ==
- Voyages to Vinland: The First American Saga (1942)
- Spoken Norwegian (1946)
- The Norwegian Language in America: A Study in Bilingual Behavior (1953)
- Bilingualism in the Americas (1956)
- The Semantics of Icelandic Orientation (1957)
- Language Conflict and Language Planning: The Case of Modern Norwegian (1966)
- Studies by Einar Haugen: Presented on the Occasion of his 65th birthday ( 1971)
- The Ecology of Language: Language Science and National Development (1972)
- Norwegian-English Dictionary: A Pronouncing and Translating Dictionary of Modern Norwegian (1974)
- The Scandinavian Languages: An Introduction to Their History (1976)
- Bibliography of Scandinavian Languages and Linguistics 1900-70 (1974)
- Scandinavian Language Structures (1982)
- Blessings of Babel: Bilingualism and Language Planning (1987)
- Immigrant Idealist: A Literary Biography of Waldemar Ager, Norwegian American (1989)
- Ole Bull: Norway's Romantic Musician and Cosmopolitan Patriot (1993)

== See also ==
- Schizoglossia, term coined by Haugen
- List of presidents of the Linguistic Society of America

== Additional reading ==
- Lovoll, Odd S. (1999) The History of the Norwegian-American People (Minneapolis, MN: University of Minnesota Press)
- Gulliksen, Øyvind Tveitereid (2004) Twofold Identities: Norwegian-American Contributions to Midwestern Literature (New York City: Peter Lang Publishing Co.) ISBN 9780820462301
