= Nesset Parsonage =

Coordinates: 62°45′17.83″N 8°1′45.85″E

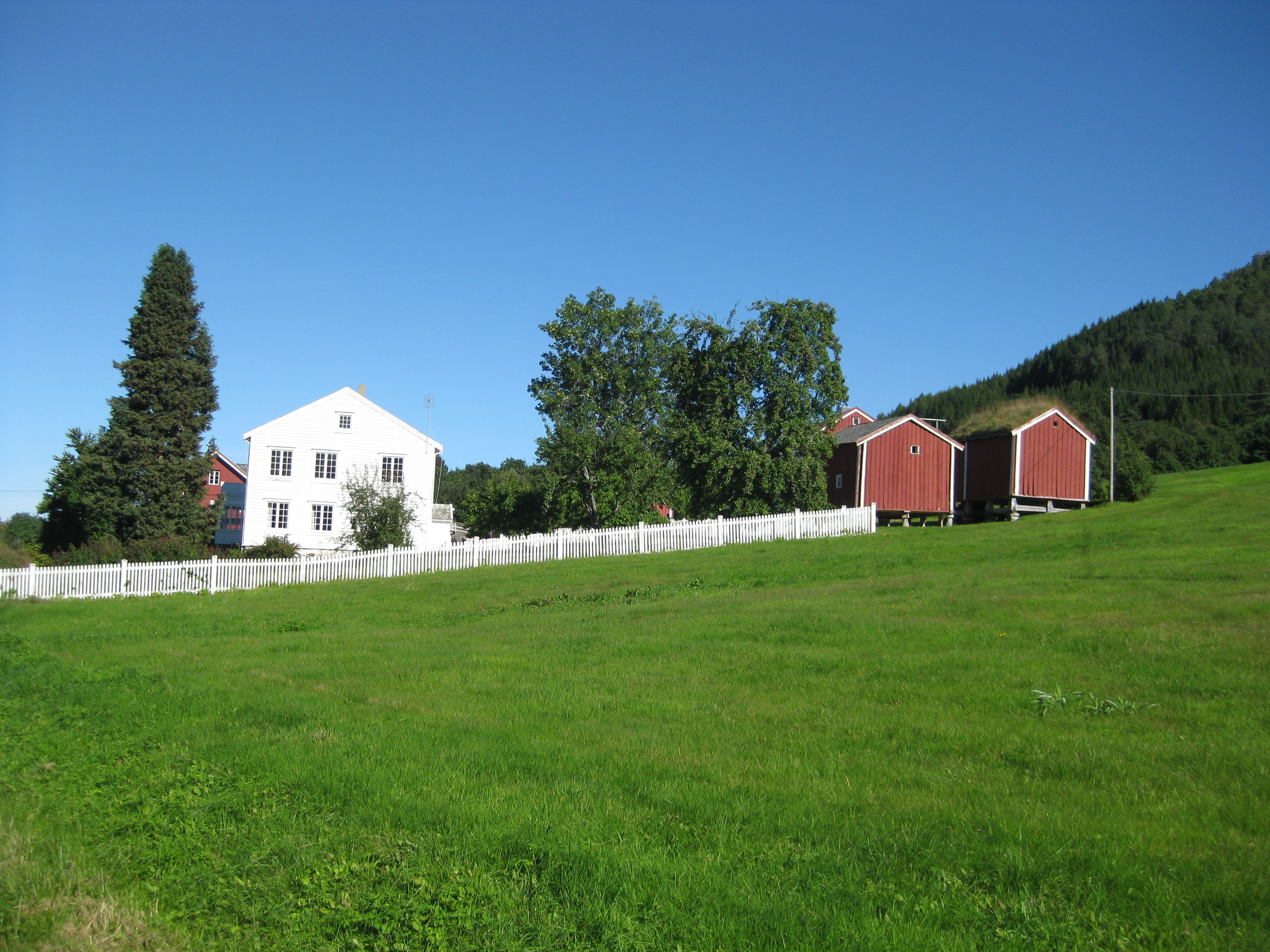
The Nesset Parsonage in 2010

The Nesset Parsonage (Norwegian: Nesset prestegård) lies 3 kilometers (1.9 mi) southwest of the village of Eidsvåg on the south side of Langfjorden in Molde Municipality in Møre og Romsdal county, Norway. The parsonage is located on a small farm and it was the home of the priest for Nesset Church. Historically, Nesset Church was the main church for the parish of Nesset Municipality (which became part of Molde Municipality in 2020).

The parsonage is especially known for being the boyhood home of the writer Bjørnstjerne Bjørnson. His father, Peder Bjørnson, served as the parish priest here from 1837 to 1853. Bjørnstjerne lived in Nesset until 1844, when he moved to Molde and started high school. The rural community and nature at the parsonage in Romsdal had a strong impact on Bjørnson's poetry.

The parsonage has been developed in a partnership between the Romsdal Museum as a museum-based consultant and the Norwegian Church Endowment (Ovf), which owns the property. The parsonage is the municipality's millennium site.

== Gallery ==
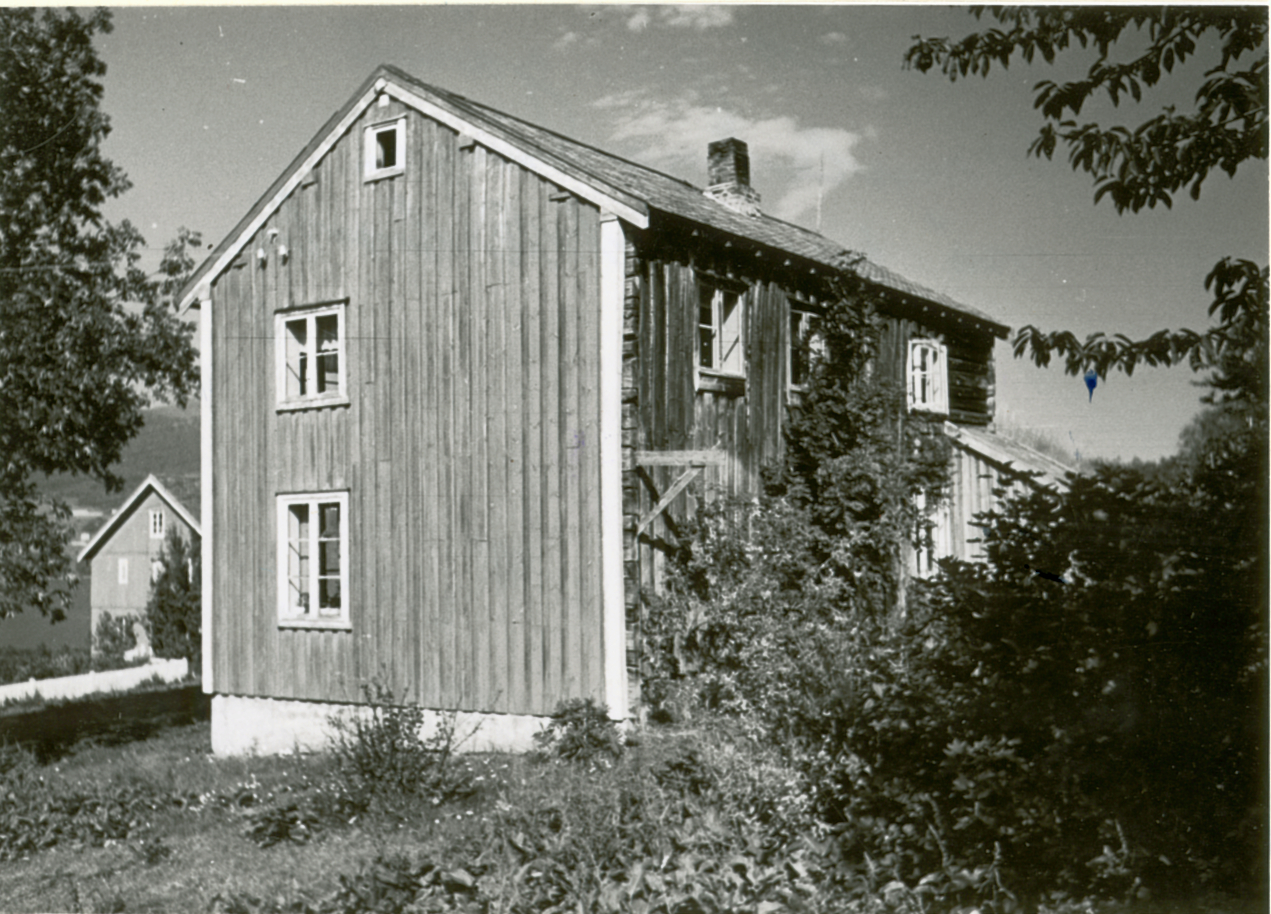
Almuens herrestue: the priest's residence, maintained by the villagers

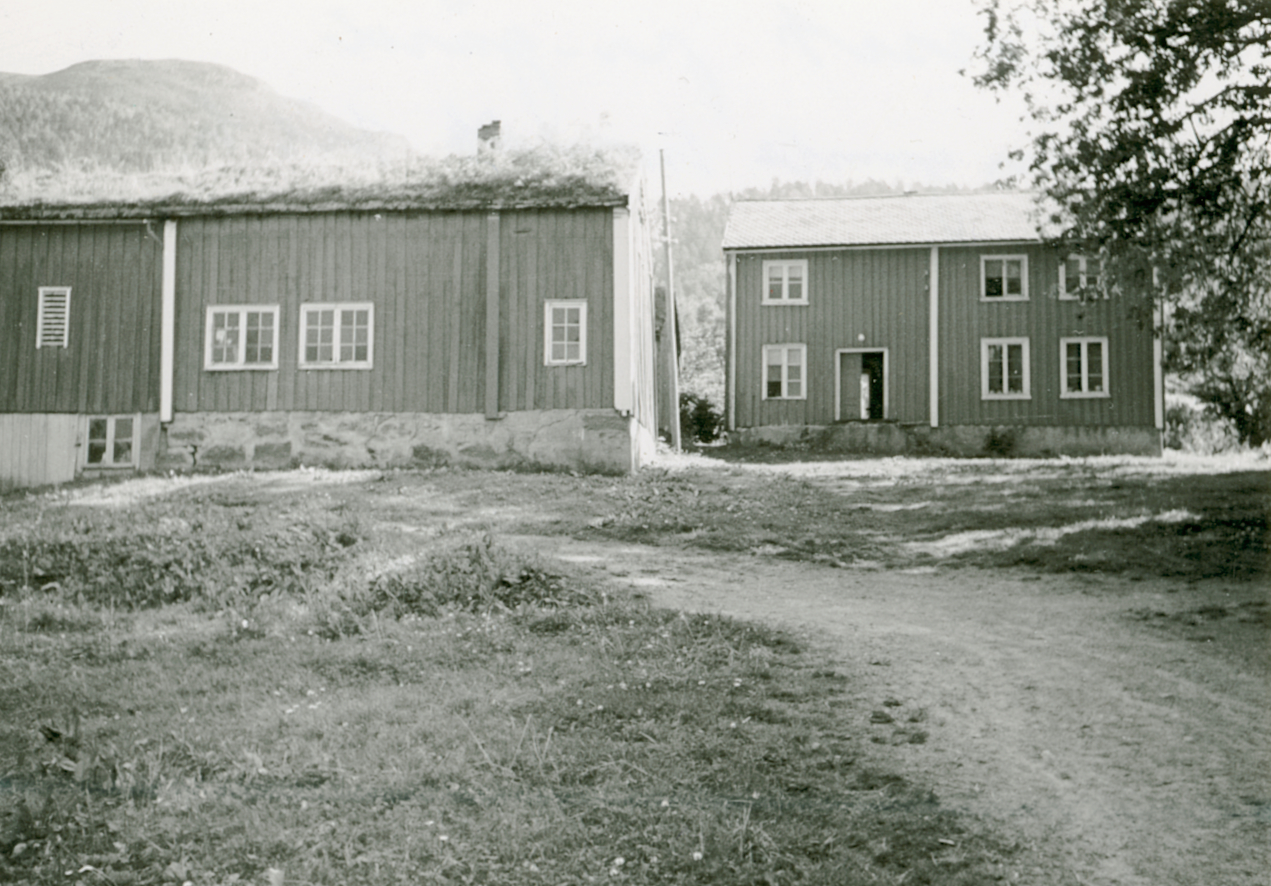
Borgstua, used for accommodation for servants, and Almuens herrestue
