= Kongebjørka =

Monumental tree in Molde, Norway

Coordinates: 62.7402557°N 7.1279409°E

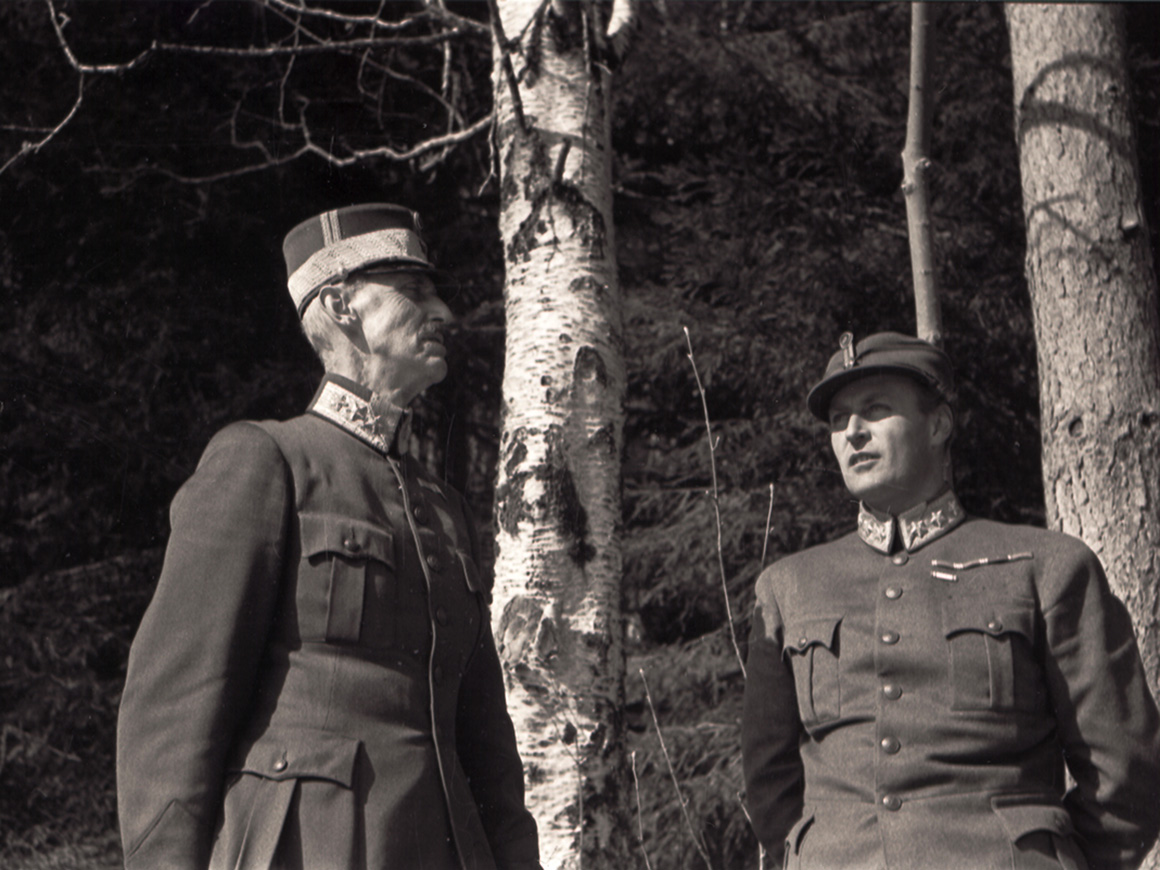
The iconic photograph of King Haakon VII and Crown Prince Olav seeking shelter under the birch tree during a German bombing raid in April 1940

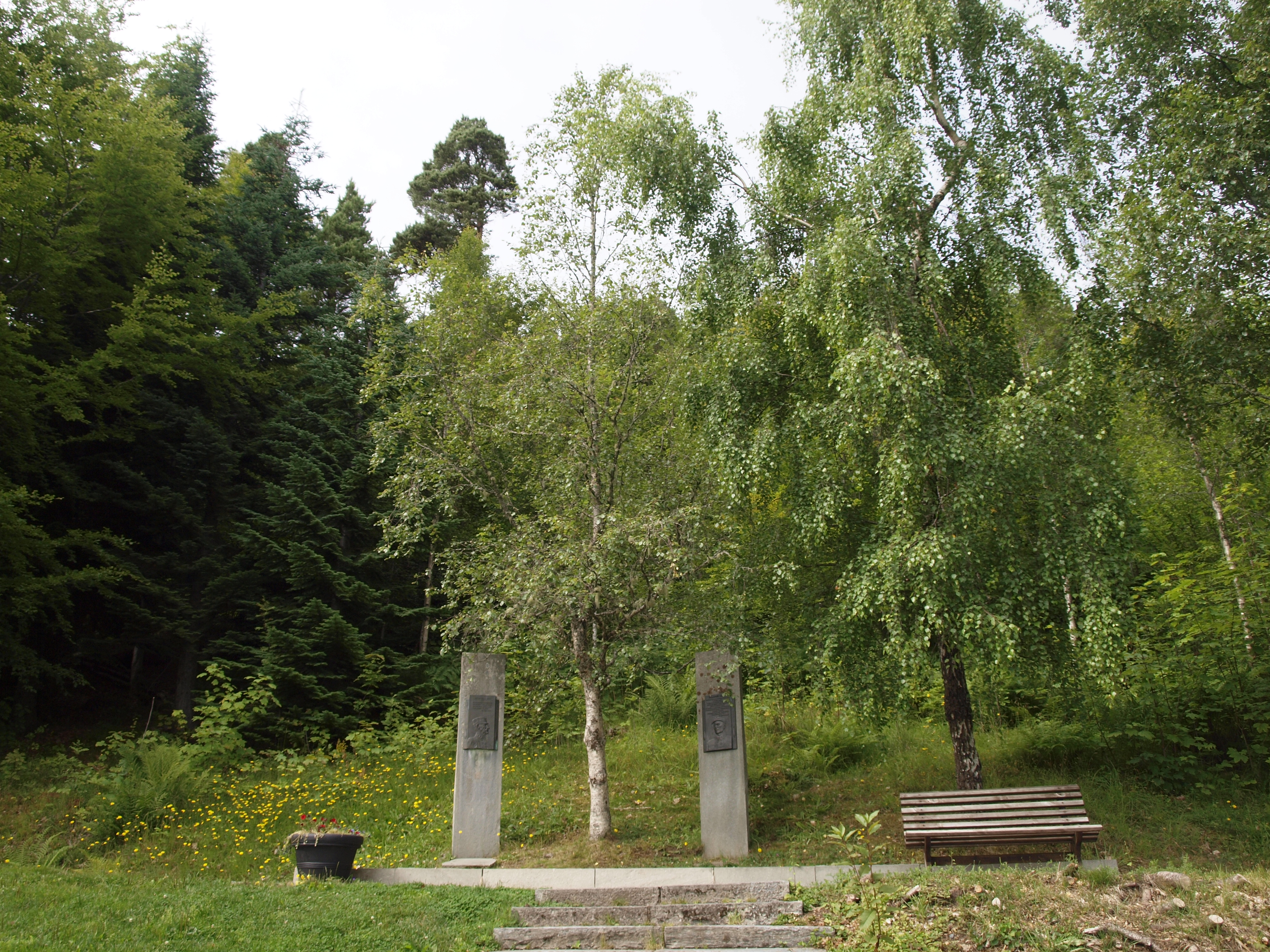
The Kongebjørka memorial in 2018

The Royal Birch (Norwegian: Kongebjørka) is a Norwegian national symbol and memorial of the Nazi occupation of Norway during World War II. It is located at Glomstua in the city of Molde in Møre og Romsdal, Norway.

King Haakon VII and Crown Prince Olav were photographed by Per Bratland seeking shelter under the birch tree during a German bombing raid during the last weekend of April 1940. The iconic image was spread across the world and inspired further resistance to the occupation. It also inspired the poet Nordahl Grieg, who was also in the area during the bombing, to write his poem Kongen.

In 1955, a memorial was erected near the tree. Close to the Royal Birch is a Peace Grove (Fredslunden) which was inaugurated in 1997. The original birch tree was destroyed by vandals in 1981, but a new birch tree was planted by King Olav V in 1982. During the 1992 New Year's storm, the replacement tree was destroyed, and a third tree was subsequently planted by King Harald V.

== See also ==
- Bjørnson Festival
- Royal Oak
