= Zino Vinnikov =

Russian-Dutch violinist

Zino Vinnikov (Russian: Зиновий Винников) (born 1943) is a Russian-Dutch violinist and one of the leading representatives of the St Petersburg violin tradition.

== Biography ==
Vinnikov studied with Abram Shtern in Kiev, and later at the St Petersburg Conservatory (then Leningrad Conservatory) with Mikhail Vaiman (1926-1977) and Benjamin Sher, himself a pupil of Korguev, the pupil of the legendary Leopold Auer. He made his solo debut in 1963 on the stages of the St Petersburg Philharmonia and the Mariinsky Theatre (Kirov Theater). While still a student, Vinnikov won First Prize at the USSR National Violin Competition in 1965 (ex aequo with Viktor Tretiakov). Vinnikov was also one of the prizewinners of both the 1966 International Tchaikovsky Competition in Moscow and the 1971 Queen Elisabeth Music Competition in Brussels, and won First Prize at the 1967 George Enescu Violin Competition in Bucharest.

Upon completing his postgraduate studies, Zino Vinnikov was invited to become a professor at the St Petersburg Conservatory. In the early years of his career as a soloist Vinnikov performed with the country's leading orchestras throughout the former Soviet Union and abroad. In 1979 he accepted an invitation from the Residentie Orchestra to settle in The Hague. Since then the artist has resided in the Netherlands, which granted him citizenship by Royal decree in 1982, and in France.

Today, Zino Vinnikov is an internationally recognised artist with broad musical interests and a remarkably rich repertoire. He has toured worldwide, appearing in most countries of Europe and the former Soviet Union, the United States, Canada, South America, Japan and China. Vinnikov has performed as a soloist under leading conductors such as Yuri Temirkanov, Evgeny Svetlanov, Mariss Jansons, Neeme Järvi, Gennady Rozhdestvensky, André Previn, Alain Lombard, Hans Vonk, Jaap van Zweden and Vladimir Ashkenazy. He also developed an especially close musical partnership with Yehudi Menuhin, who confessed to being an admirer of Vinnikov's art. Their recording of the Tchaikovsky Violin Concerto in D major, Sérénade mélancolique, and Mélodie (with Lord Menuhin conducting the Royal Philharmonic Orchestra of London) received wide acclaim and has since been re-released several times. His 2002 album Zino Vinnikov Plays Fritz Kreisler also received enthusiastic reviews, such as "a tour de force, in which Vinnikov is forced to switch tempo, playing style and dynamics at a moment’s notice. Those looking to hear a master at the top of his game need look no further.", "captivating recording by [an] excellent violinist", and "Vinnikov has the rare capacity to ally delightful technical mastery with depth and subtlety of interpretation."

Zino Vinnikov has been concertmaster (leader) of the St Petersburg Philharmonic Orchestra, The Royal Philharmonic Orchestra of London, the Orchestre National Bordeaux Aquitaine, and the Residentie Orchestra of The Hague. In these capacities he contributed to numerous recordings of the key orchestral repertoire with some of the world's leading conductors.

Also an active chamber music player, Zino Vinnikov has performed with fine musicians such as Philippe Hirschhorn, Mischa Maisky, Natalia Gutman, Boris Pergamenschikow, Eliso Virsaladze, Ronald Brautigam, Dmitri Ferschtman, Elisabeth Leonskaya and others. For over a decade he was First Violinist of the Netherlands-based Glinka Quartett, which he co-founded and with which he toured widely. He has participated in a wide range of music festivals including Edinburgh, Santander, Athens, St Petersburg, Bonn, Paris, Bordeaux and London.

For years Zino Vinnikov held professorships at the St Petersburg Conservatory, the Rotterdam Conservatory, the Utrecht Conservatory, and the Benjamin Britten Academy. He is regularly invited to deliver masterclasses (including at the St Petersburg Conservatory), to serve on the jury of international violin competitions, and continues to teach select private students in the Netherlands.

In September 2013 Zino Vinnikov was awarded a Knighthood in the Order of the Netherlands Lion (the country's highest and oldest civilian order) for services to music.

== Recordings ==
Recordings by Zino Vinnikov have been released under the Melodiya, RCA/Erasmus, Residentie Orkest, Tring International, RPO, Eroica Classical, and IMLab Classical labels. Many are available on major online music streaming services (Spotify, iTunes, Google Play). They feature works by Achron, Albéniz, Bach, Bartók, Bloch, Chausson, Chopin, Debussy, Dvořák, Gade, Haydn, Kreisler, Massenet, Milhaud, Mozart, Ponce, Ravel, Saint-Saëns, Sarasate, Schubert, Suk, Tchaikovsky, Vivaldi, Wieniawski, and Ysaÿe.
