= Sérénade mélancolique =

Piece by Tchaikovsky

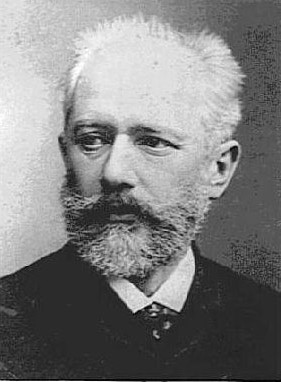
Pyotr Ilyich Tchaikovsky c. 1875

Sérénade mélancolique
Performed by Grégor Monlun, recorded and mixed by Cynthia Wong

Sérénade mélancolique in B♭ minor for violin and orchestra, Op. 26 (Russian: Меланхолическая серенада), is a piece by Pyotr Ilyich Tchaikovsky that was written in February 1875. It was his first work for violin and orchestra and was written immediately after he completed his First Piano Concerto.

== Background ==
Hungarian violinist Leopold Auer had been professor of violin at the Imperial Conservatory in St. Petersburg since 1868. Tchaikovsky was a professor at the Moscow Conservatory starting in 1866 and knew of Auer. He had seen him perform in public, having noted "the great expressivity, the thoughtful finesse and poetry of the interpretation" in an 1874 review of Auer's playing. They met in January 1875, when both attended a reception at the home of Nikolai Rubinstein. Some sources say Tchaikovsky then resolved to write a piece for him, with one source saying Auer commissioned it, resulting in Sérénade mélancolique. It was completed by the following month. Tchaikovsky mentioned it in a letter to his brother Modest in February, where he wrote: "I have finished my Piano Concerto, and have already written a violin piece I have promised to Auer."

The piece was dedicated to Auer upon its publication by P. Jurgenson in February 1876, but Auer did not premiere it. It was first performed by Adolph Brodsky in January of 1876, at the seventh symphony concert of the Russian Musical Society in Moscow.

Two years later, Tchaikovsky was offended by Auer's criticisms of, and refusal to perform, the Violin Concerto in D major written for him, and he withdrew the dedication from both the concerto and Sérénade mélancolique, although it was impossible to remove his name from the edition then being printed by Jurgenson.

== Music ==
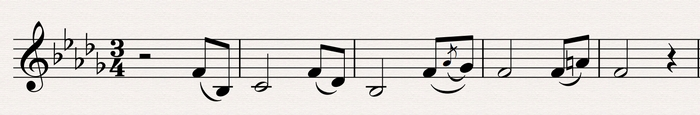
The main theme of Sérénade mélancolique, first played by the solo violin.

The piece is originally orchestrated for solo violin, two flutes, two oboes, two clarinets in B♭, two bassoons, four horns in F, and strings. There are various arrangements for violin and piano, including the composer's own arrangement.

The score of the Sérénade mélancolique shows that it is clearly written in the key of B♭ minor, although a number of sources describe it as being in B minor. This confusion may have come about because the note the English-speaking world calls B♭ is known in German musical nomenclature as B, while B♮ is known in Germany as H.

The piece borrows from other compositions Tchaikovsky was working on at the time. The beginning is quoted from Oxana's challenge to Vakula in Act II, Scene 2 of Vakula the Smith/Cherevichki. A melody in the central section mirrors a melody from the slow movement of the Piano Concerto No. 1.
