= Gustav Kross =

Russian pianist and teacher (1831-1885)

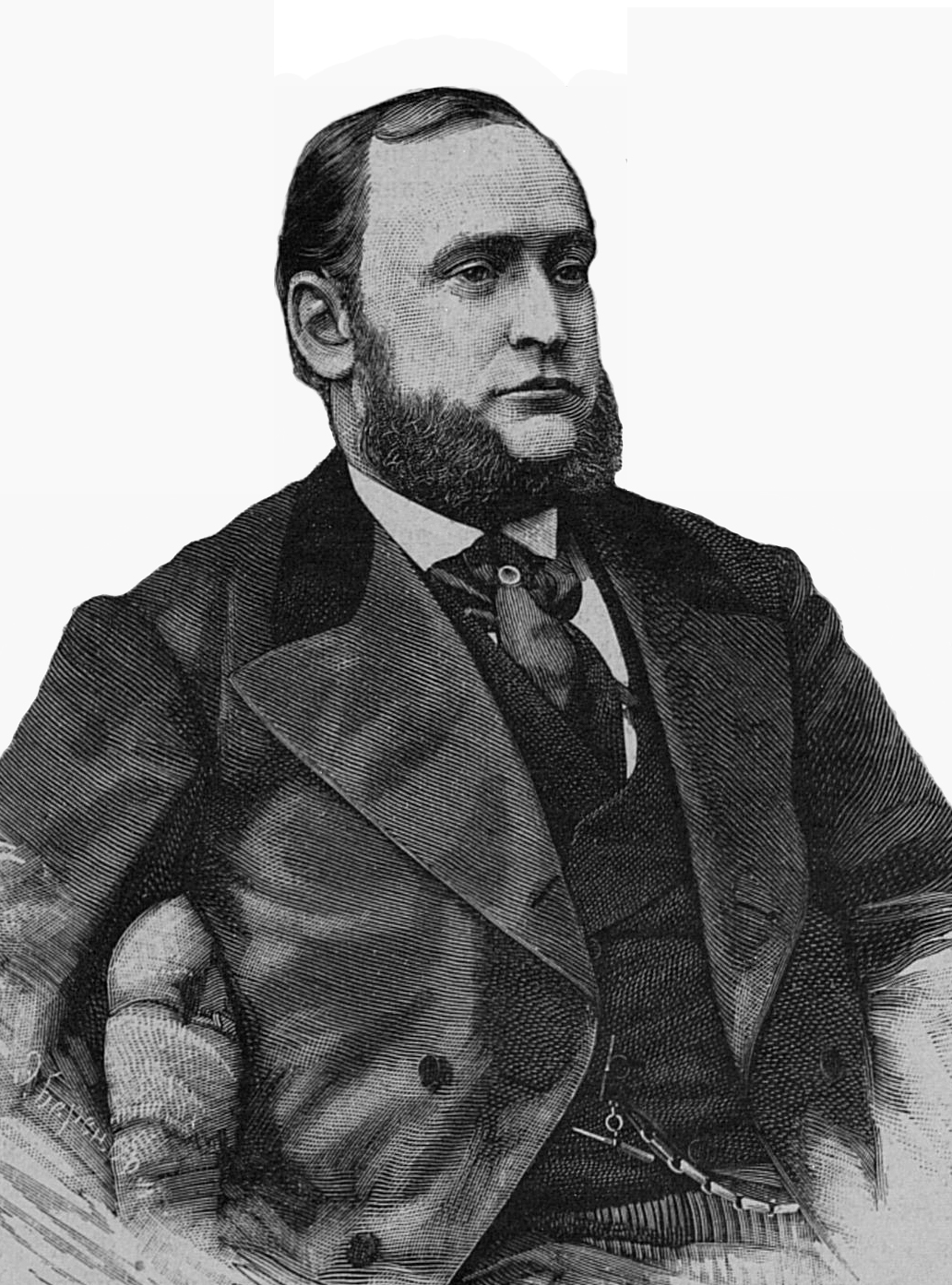
Gustav Kross

Gustav Kross (12 July [O.S. 30 June] 1831 – 25 October [O.S. 13 October] 1885) was a Russian pianist and teacher. He is primarily remembered for being the soloist of the first, negatively-received Russian performance of Tchaikovsky's Piano Concerto No. 1.

== Biography ==
Gustav Gustavovich Kross was born in Saint Petersburg in 1831. He gave solo piano recitals from the 1850s. He was an enthusiastic supporter of the Russian Musical Society 1859-67. In 1862 he was among the first group of students at the fledgling Saint Petersburg Conservatory, where he studied under Anton Rubinstein and Adolf von Henselt. In 1865 he was in the inaugural class of graduates, along with Pyotr Ilyich Tchaikovsky and others.

From 1867 Kross taught piano at the Conservatory. Among his pupils were Vladimir Demyansky and Anna Ornatskaya, who were both early teachers of Sergei Rachmaninoff.

He is credited with the first performance in Russia of Franz Liszt's Piano Concerto No. 2 in A. There is a note of his performance of Litolff's Concerto Symphonique No. 4 in D minor, Op. 102.

But his name is most often associated with the first Russian performance of Tchaikovsky's Piano Concerto No. 1 in B-flat minor. This occurred in Saint Petersburg on 1/13 November 1875, just under three weeks after its world premiere by Hans von Bülow in Boston, Mass., in the United States (25 October). Kross played under the baton of the conductor Eduard Nápravník, and in the presence of the composer. His performance was by all accounts execrable. Tchaikovsky referred to it as "an atrocious cacophony", and the critics were similarly negative, but they extended their remarks to the quality of the concerto itself. One critic said the concerto (Tchaikovsky's first concertante work) was "like the first pancake ...a flop".

Tchaikovsky then chose Sergei Taneyev for the Moscow premiere, and was so delighted with the result that Taneyev premiered all Tchaikovsky's later works for piano and orchestra and his Piano Trio in A minor.

Gustav Kross died in 1885 in the city of his birth, aged 54.
