= Livery Antonovich Sacchetti =

Italian-Russian musicologist (1852–1916)

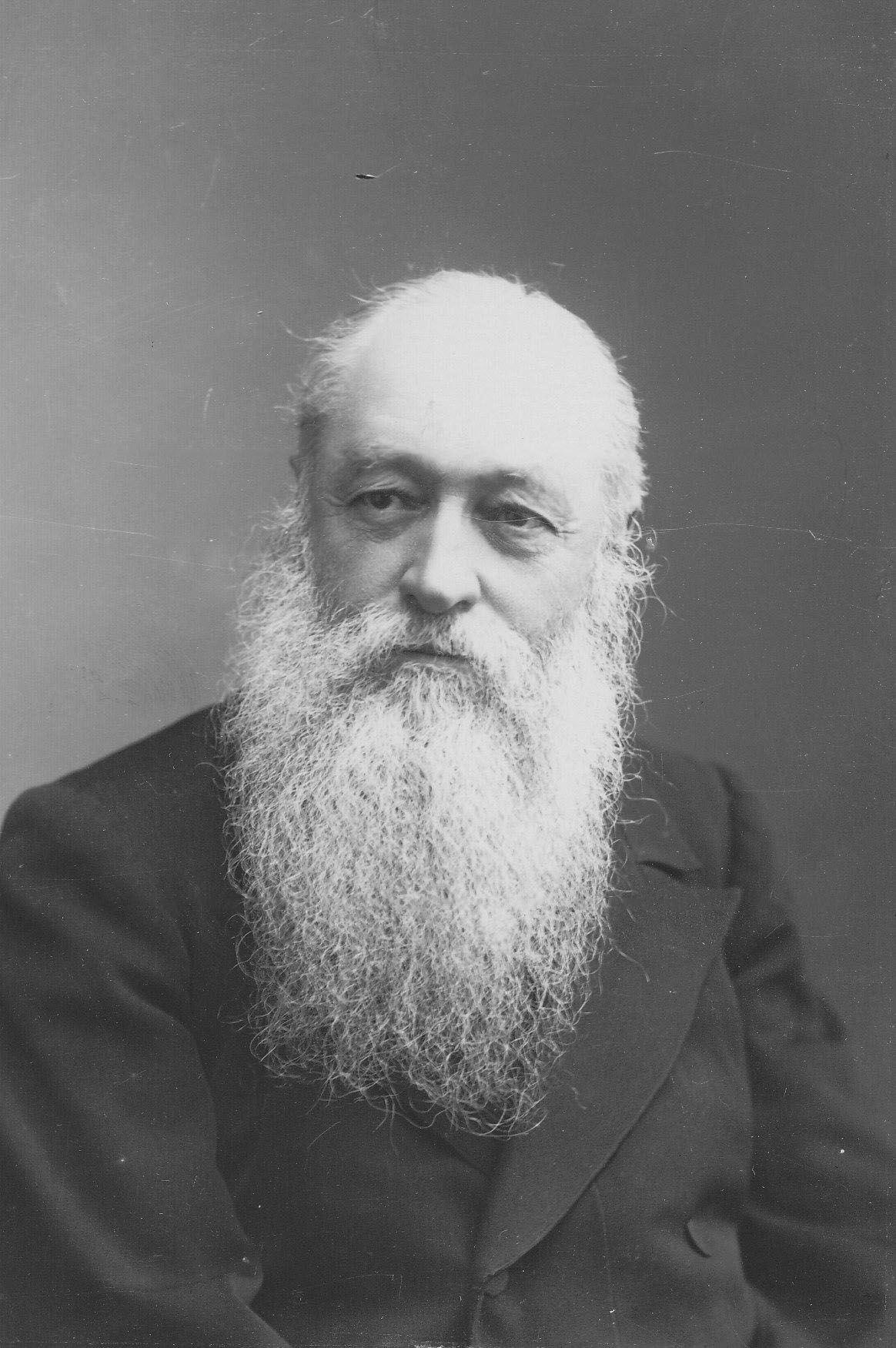
- Livery Sacchetti in 1916
- Born: August 18, 1852; Ust-Kenzar, Tambov Governorate
- Died: February 26, 1916 (aged 63); Petrograd
- Occupation(s): Music historian, theoretician, music critic

Livery Antonovich Sachetti (1852–1916) (Russian: Ливери Антонович Сакетти, romanized: Livery Antonovich Sachetti) was an Italian-Russian music historian, theoretician, and music critic of the 19th century. He was the first professor in music history and aesthetics at the Saint Petersburg Conservatory, and was a member of the Bologna Philharmonic Academy. His 1883 essay entitled "Essay on the General History of Music" is considered to be the earliest systematic study on the history of Russian music in the country, and his detailed studies of music theory, music pedagogy, and musical aesthetics are still used in conservatories and academies today.

He died on February 26, 1916, and was buried at the Smolensk Orthodox Cemetery.

== Family and education ==
Sachetti was born in 1852 in the town of Ust-Kenzar located in Tambov Oblast, Russian Empire.

He was born into a prominent family of Italian flautists who worked for the imperial Russian court, and is confirmed to have had one son, Alexander Sacchetti^{[rus]}. Beginning at the age of seven, he began learning piano and by the age of 11, he began studying cello, eventually taking tutelage under Karl Davydov.

Livery continued with his musical education at the St. Petersburg Conservatory and upon his graduation in 1875, was awarded the title of "Free Artist." He pursued a pedagogical career and in 1895, successfully passed an examination held by the Testing Committee of the St. Petersburg Educational District.

== Career ==
Following his musical studies, Livery went on to pursue a career in teaching beginning as early as 1878. He eventually became a professor in music history and aesthetics at the St. Petersburg Conservatory. In 1886, he began teaching his first classes at the second level, and from 1901 until his death in 1916 began teaching at the first-class level. This marked the first time in Russian conservatory practice where classes on music history and aesthetics were being formally taught.

Beginning in 1896, Livery began work at the Imperial Library of Russia under the directorship of Vladimir Stasov, one of the main ideologues of The Five, known as the "Balakirev Circle." He eventually became a senior librarian in 1911 to 1915. During this time, however, Livery was active in establishing several different societies including the Society of Music Teachers and Other Musical Figures (1889) and the Imperial Musical Historical Society (1910-1916).^{[rus]}

Throughout his career, Livery acted as a representative of the Imperial Russian Musical Society founded by Grand Duchess Elena Pavlovna and composer Anton Rubinstein during cosmopolitan events. Such events include the Exposition Universelle as part of the "International Congress of Music History" and the 1888 Grand International Exhibition held in Brussels. Livery was also a staunch advocate of public access to music history. Thus, he routinely gave public lectures and music classes beginning in the late 1880s up to his death in the 1910s.

== Classes ==
Livery taught several types of classes during his career:

- Harmony (1878–1916)
- Solfeggio (1879–1890, 1895–1916)
- History of music (1880–1916)
- Counterpoint (1886–1887)
- Encyclopedia (1887–1916)
- Musical aesthetics (1883–1916)

== Students ==
Livery Sachetti had many notable students during his years of pedagogical service. Among them include,

- Samuel Maykapar
- K.V. Meghvinetuhutsesi (father of Otar Megvinetukhutsesi)
- Sergei Prokofiev
- Aram A. Ter-Hovhannisyan

== Works ==
- 1891: "An Essay on the General History of Music" (2nd ed.)
- 1892: "Collection of exemplary works of former times" (addition in Russian music magazine "Muse")
- 1894: "On the musical artistry of the ancient Greeks"
- 1896: "Brief historical musical reader from ancient times to the 17th century" (St. Petersburg)
- 1896: "From the field of aesthetics and music" (St. Petersburg)

=== Undated ===
- "Overview of the main foundations of aesthetics" (Included in "Bulletin of Fine Arts")

== See also ==
- List of Russian composers
- Music of Russia

== Further sources ==
1. Саккетти Л. А: (Университетская библиотека ONLINE: Л. Ю., Силенок)
