= Karl Kipp =

Russian pianist and teacher (1865–1925)

- Карл Кипп
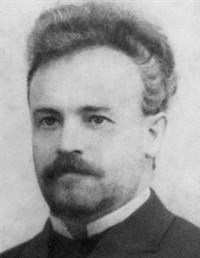
- Born: Ludwig Karl August; November 11, 1865; Saint Petersburg, Russia
- Died: March 26, 1925 (aged 59); Moscow, Soviet Union
- Education: Moscow Conservatory
- Years active: 1888–1921

Karl Avgustovich Kipp (Russian: Карл Августович Кипп; November 11 [O.S. October 30] 1865 – March 26, 1925) was a Russian pianist and teacher. He was a professor at the Moscow Conservatory for three decades, and was widely acclaimed for teaching virtuosic piano technique. He influenced dozens of notable pianists including Sergei Rachmaninoff, Yuri Bryushkov, and Vsevolod Zaderatsky.

== Early life and education ==
Kipp was born Ludwig Karl August in Saint Petersburg, or possibly Minsk, to a family of Volga Germans in the Russian Empire in 1865. He began to study music in Minsk, where he completed his secondary education.

In 1880, he entered the Moscow Conservatory, studying under Russian pianists Pavel Pabst and Eduard Langer. He graduated in 1888.

== Career ==
Soon after completing his studies in Moscow, Kipp discovered an interest in music education. He began his career teaching at the Russian Musical Society in Tambov, where he performed in concerts. In 1892, he returned to the Moscow Conservatory as a piano teacher for younger students. He became a professor in 1909, dedicating himself entirely to instructing senior students. Among his most notable students were Yuri Bryushkov, Vsevolod Zaderatsky, Lyubov Orlova, Mikhail Raukhverger, Leonid Polovinkin, Abram Shatskes, Xenia Prochorowa, Boris Goldovsky, and Boleslav Yavorsky.

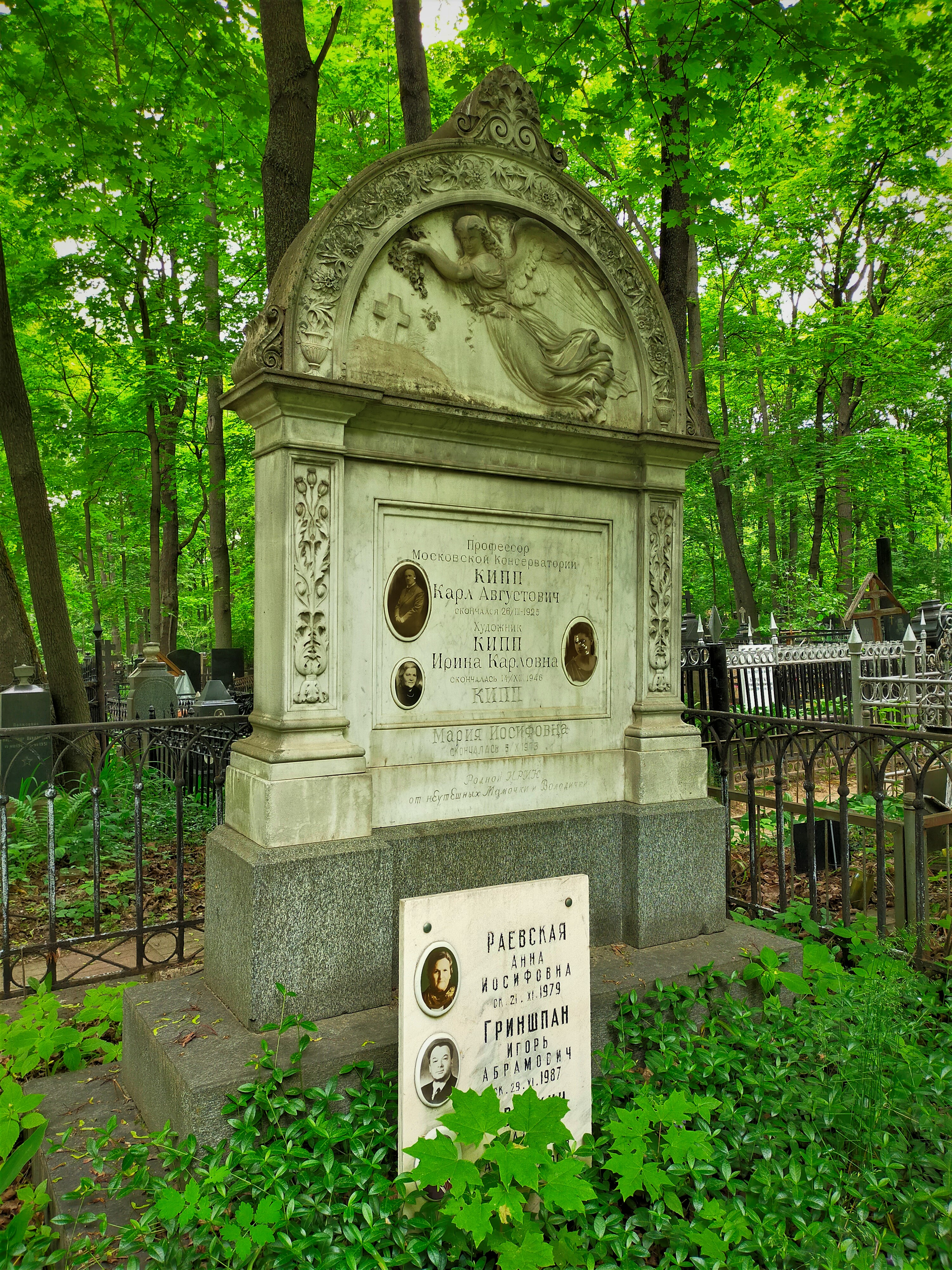
Tomb of Karl and his daughter in Moscow

Kipp performed piano concerts in Moscow for decades, mainly chamber music within private circles. On December 9, 1907, he performed Mozart's Piano Concerto No. 20 under Sergei Vasilenko, with critics lauding his excellent technique and musicality. Kipp played in ensembles with violinists including Jan Hřímalý. He cited the Polish-American pianist Josef Hofmann as an inspiration.

His teaching of virtuosic piano techniques was widely praised, with Alexander Borovsky calling him the "sorcerer professor". Nikolai Medtner jokingly referred to his students, all with impeccable technique, as "Kipp's trotters", and Aleksandr Goldenweiser likened his significance as a teacher to that of his renowned predecessor, Nikolai Zverev.

He died on March 26, 1925, aged 59. He was buried at the Vvedenskoye Cemetery in Moscow.

== Personal life ==
Kipp married Russian singer Maria Iosifovna Nikolaevskaya (1890–1973). The couple had a daughter, Irina Karlovna Kipp, in 1914.

In his apartment, there hung a large photograph of Rachmaninoff by his piano with the inscription: "To the god of technique—a grateful Sergei Rachmaninoff".
