= Margarita Mandelstamm =

Russian violinist

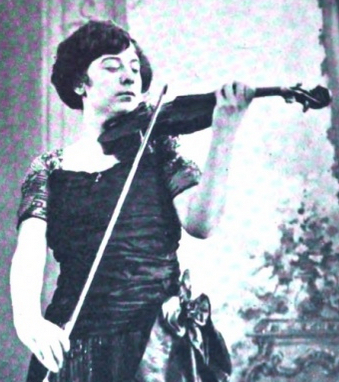
- Margarita Mandelstamm Selinsky, from a 1921 publication
- Born: June 1, 1895; Riga, Russian Empire
- Died: February 11, 1962 (aged 66); Los Angeles, California, US
- Other name: Margarita Selinsky
- Occupations: Violinist, music educator
- Spouse: Max Selinsky
- Relatives: Elsa Gidoni (sister)

Margarita Mandelstamm (June 1, 1895 – February 11, 1962), in Russian Маргари́та Фа́йвушевна (Па́вловна) Мандельшта́м, later known as Margarita Selinsky, was a violinist born in Riga, and based in the United States after 1921.

== Early life ==
Margarita Mandelstamm was born in Riga (then in the Russian Empire), the daughter of Faivush (Pavel) Mandelstamm and Minna Mandelstamm. Her family was Jewish. Her father was a medical doctor in the Russian Army. Her younger sister was architect Elsa Gidoni. Mandelstamm trained as a violinist in Berlin with Willy Hess, and at the Saint Petersburg Conservatory with Leopold Auer.

== Career ==
Mandelstamm made her concert debut in Saint Petersburg in 1915. In 1917, during World War I, she and her family were held for several weeks in a German refugee camp in Ukraine, briefly returned to Riga, then moved to Berlin. She played with the Berlin Philharmonic, and in recitals there. In 1921, she moved to the United States with her American husband, Max Selinsky, a fellow musician. The Selinskys gave their first American recital at New York's Aeolian Hall, and toured North America playing rarely-heard violin duets through the 1920s and 1930s. In 1940 they performed with their pianist daughter in 1940 as the Selinsky Trio.

== Personal life ==
Mandelstamm married American violinist Max Selinsky in 1920. They had a son, Victor, who became an artist and art teacher, and a daughter, Xenia, who became a pianist and performed with her parents from an early age. Margarita Selinsky died in 1962, in Los Angeles, aged 66 years.
