= Pirogov =

Pirogov (Russian: Пирогов), or Pirogova (feminine; Пирогова) is a Russian surname, derived from the word "пирог" (pie or cake). Notable people with the surname include:

- Alexander Pirogov (1899–1964), Russian Soviet opera singer
- Grigory Pirogov (1885–1931), Russian Soviet opera singer
- Kirill Pirogov (born 1973), Russian actor
- Nikolay Ivanovich Pirogov (1810–1881), prominent Russian scientist
  - Pirogov (film), 1947 Soviet film, notable for the musical score composed by Dmitri Shostakovich
  - Pirogov Hospital, a hospital in Sofia, Bulgaria named after him
  - 2506 Pirogov, an asteroid named after him
  - Pirogov Park, a park in Tartu, Estonia, named after him
  - Pirogov, Leonid Gregor (1910-1968), A Soviet Actor.
- Nikolay Nikolayevich Pirogov (1843–1891), Russian physicist and son of Nikolay Ivanovich Pirogov
- Vladimir Pirogov (1918–2001), Soviet aircraft pilot and Hero of the Soviet Union

== See also ==
- Pyrohiv, or "Pirogovo", a historic location in the outskirts of Kiev, Ukraine, that houses an open-air museum
- Pirogovo
