= Hieronymus Weickmann =

Russian viola player and composer (1824–1896)

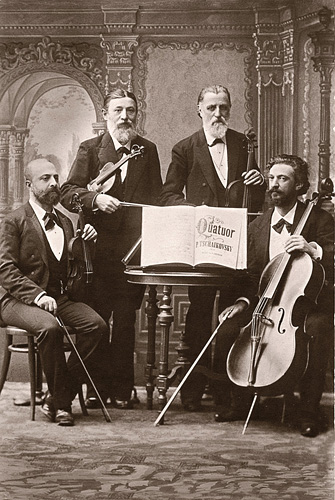
The String Quartet of the Russian Musical Society of Saint Petersburg in the 1880s; (left to right) Leopold Auer, Johann Wilhelm Zacharias Pickel, Hieronymus Weickmann, Aleksandr Verzhbilovich

Hieronymus Weickmann (Russian: Иероним Андреевич Вейкман; 26 February 1825 in Nuremberg – 26 April 1895 in Nuremberg) was an Imperial Russian viola player, composer and music educator of German descent.

Weickmann worked in Saint Petersburg, Russia from 1853 to 1891. He played in the Mariinsky Theatre Orchestra from 1855 to 1890. Along with Leopold Auer, Johann Wilhelm Zacharias Pickel and Karl Davydov, and later Aleksandr Verzhbilovich, he was a member of the quartet of the Russian Musical Society in Saint Petersburg from 1859–1889. He often appeared as viola soloist performing, in particular, the solo part in Hector Berlioz' Harold en Italie conducted by the composer during his tour of Russia in 1867–1868.

Weickmann taught viola at the Saint Petersburg Conservatory from 1863, and was appointed the first Professor of Viola in 1870. Among his students was Vasily Bessel, later a well-known music publisher.

Anton Rubinstein wrote his Viola Sonata for Weickmann who premiered the work in 1855 with the composer at the piano. Henryk Wieniawski also composed his Rêverie in F♯ minor in 1855 for Weickmann.

== Selected works ==
Chamber music

- Gebet in D♭ major (published c.1879)
- Fantasie in F major for cello or viola and piano (1884)
- 2 Stücke (2 Pieces) for viola and piano, Op. 4 (1890)

1. Nachtlied (Night Song) in D♭ major
2. Wiegenlied (Lullaby) in F major

- 6 leichte Stücke (6 Easy Pieces) for violin and piano, Op. 8 (1892)

1. Weihnachtslied
2. Ein Tänzchen im Freien
3. Jagdstück
4. Rundgesang (Kanon)
5. Schaukelpferd
6. Haschen

Vocal

- 6 Lieder for voice and piano (1890)

1. Wiegenlied „Schlafe Kindlein, hold und süß“
2. Komm mit „Es zwitschert ein Vöglein: Komm mit“
3. „Nicht milder ist des Mondes Silberlicht“
4. Waldeinsamkeit „Deine süßen Schauer“
5. Am Strand „Der Hauch der die schäumende Meerflut erregt“
6. Wanderrast „Hier ruht sich's gut“
