= Georgiy Ginovker =

Dr. Georgiy Ginovker
- Born: Saint Petersburg, Russia
- Genre: Classical
- Occupation: Music educator
- Instrument: Cello
- Labels: Melodiya; Bomba-Piter
- Formerly of: Saint Petersburg Philharmonic Orchestra

Georgiy Ginovker (Russian: Георгий Гиновкер) is a Russian cellist. He was born in St. Petersburg, Russia. He was principal cellist of Saint Petersburg Philharmonic Orchestra for almost 30 years. His primary teachers included Mstislav Rostropovich and Aleksander Schtrimer. A winner of several international competitions, Ginovker has appeared as a soloist in Russia, Europe, Japan, and the United States. He was Professor of Cello/Chamber Music at Saint Petersburg Conservatory and Rimsky-Korsakov College. Since 1992, Mr Ginovker resides in New York. Ginovker teaches cello and chamber music in New York. He is acting principal cellist of several orchestras in the New York Metro Area. He has recorded for international labels such as Melodiya and Bomba-Piter.
