= Elsa Gidoni =

German-American architect (1901–1978)

Elsa Mandelstamm Gidoni
- Born: Elsa Mandelstamm; March 12, 1901; Riga, Latvia
- Died: April 19, 1978 (aged 77); Washington, D.C.
- Known for: Architecture
- Movement: International Style
- Spouse(s): Alexander Gidoni, Alexis L. Gluckmann

Elsa Mandelstamm Gidoni (March 12, 1901 – April 19, 1978) was a German-American architect and interior designer.

== Early life ==
Gidoni was born Elsa Mandelstamm in Riga, Latvia, into a Lithuanian-Jewish family. Her father Fayvush (Pavel) Mandelstamm was a physician. She studied at the Imperial Academy of Arts in St. Petersburg from 1916 to 1917 and at the Technische Hochschule in Berlin-Charlottenburg (now Technische Universität Berlin) in the mid-1920s. She then operated her own interior design firm from 1929 to 1933.

== Tel Aviv ==
In 1933, once Adolf Hitler became Chancellor, sweeping anti-Jewish legislation was passed, with the result that Jews were unable to practice their profession in Germany. Gidoni left Berlin and settled in Tel Aviv where she practiced as an architect until 1938. There, she designed an economics school and worked on various projects such as planning the Swedish Pavilion at the Levant-Fair and the Café Galina. Much of Gidoni's work was of the International Style, an architecture style that became popular after World War I and is characterized by the use of industrial materials, lack of color, and flat surfaces.

== New York ==
In 1938, she left Tel-Aviv due to increasing conflict within the political landscape, and moved to New York where she worked as an interior designer for Fellheimer & Wagner before eventually finding work as a project designer at the architectural firm of Kahn & Jacobs. With Kahn & Jacobs she was the lead architect on several significant commissions including the Universal Pictures Building at 445 Park Avenue in Manhattan, completed in 1947. Praising its use of light and other structural features, architectural historian and critic, Lewis Mumford, called the 445 Park Avenue office building "technical milestone." The Britannica Book of the Year 1947 included the building as among the five top architectural achievements of the year. The four other notable structures cited were designed, respectively, by Oscar Niemeyer, Alvar Aalto, Buckminster Fuller, and Le Corbusier.

She became a member of the American Institute of Architects (AIA) in 1943. In 1960, she was one of 260 women in the AIA and only one of 12 working in New York.

Her older sister was violinist Margarita Mandelstamm Selinsky. Her first husband was the art critic and writer Alexander Gidoni. She later married Alexis L. Gluckmann, an engineer. In April 1978, she died at the age of 77 at her home in Washington, D.C.

== Select works ==
Hecht Co Department Store, Ballston, Virginia

- Cafe Galina with Genia Averbuch, Levant Fair Tel Aviv, 1934
- Swedish Pavilion, Levant Fair Tel Aviv, 1934
- WIZO Pavilion, Levant Fair Tel Aviv, 1934
- Domestic Science and Agriculture School Tel Aviv, First Prize 1934. Established by WIZO
- WIZO House, Tel Aviv, 1936. Established by WIZO
- Residence Building, Ayanot Women’s Training Farm, 1935. Established by the General Council of Women Workers and WIZO
- Mothercraft Training Center and Infant Welfare, Enlarged and additional floor, Tel Aviv, 1937. Established by WIZO
- Three Apartment houses, Tel Aviv, 1937
- General Motors Futurama pavilion, 1939 World's Fair
- Research Library, 23 West 26th Street, New York
- Hecht Co Department Store, Ballston, Virginia
- Universal Pictures Building, 445 Park Ave. New York, NY
