= Vsevolod Zaderatsky =

Ukrainian composer (1891–1953)

- Всеволод Петрович Задерацкий
- Born: December 21, 1891; Rivne, Ukraine, Russian Empire
- Died: February 1, 1953 (aged 61); Lviv, Ukraine, Soviet Union
- Education: Moscow Conservatory
- Spouse: Natalia Pasichnyk

Vsevolod Petrovich Zaderatsky (Ukrainian: Всеволод Петрович Задерацький; 21 December 1891, Rivne, Ukraine – 1 February 1953, Lviv, USSR) was a Ukrainian composer, pianist and teacher.

His life was marked by continuous persecution by the Soviet government. Despite his talents as a composer and pianist, his early service as a piano teacher to the Tsar's heir and his enlistment in the White Army made him a political target. Arrested multiple times, he faced execution, imprisonment, and exile, with his compositions repeatedly destroyed. Even as he attempted to integrate into Soviet musical institutions, he was denounced and sent to a labor camp in 1937. Though later released, he remained under state suspicion, forced to spend his final years away from major cultural centers.

Despite repression by Soviet authorities, Zaderatsky created a diverse body of musical work, especially for piano. Today, he is recognized as a pioneering figure in the Russian and Ukrainian musical avant-garde.

== Life ==
In 1891, Zaderatsky was born in Rivne (Volhynian Governorate, Ukraine) into the family of a railway official. His family relocated several times during his early years, however, he spent most of his childhood and youth in Kursk. His mother taught him to play the piano. He studied law and music at the Moscow Conservatory, including under Karl Kipp. From 1915 to 1916, Zaderatsky worked as a piano teacher to the tsar's heir Alexei, which possibly became his downfall later in life.

After the October Revolution of 1917, Zaderatsky chose to enlist in the anti-Bolshevik Russian Volunteer Army under the command of Anton Denikin. In 1921, he was arrested by the Bolsheviks due to his prior service in the White Army during the Russian Civil War. He was condemned to death by firing squad. Reportedly, his life was spared by Felix Dzerzhinsky, after having heard Zaderatsky playing the piano.

Zaderatsky continued his studies under Mikhail Ippolitov-Ivanov and Sergei Taneyev, graduating from the conservatory in 1923. From the mid-1920s he began performing as a pianist, giving many solo concerts and performing together with the famous bass Grigory Pirogov.

In 1926 he was arrested and sent to Ryazan prison for three years. All his compositions and probably even literary productions were obliterated. In 1930, he was permitted to relocate to Moscow and work as a composer for All-Union Radio. He established connections with the Moscow musical avant-garde and befriended the composer Alexander Mossolov.

While in Moscow, Zaderatsky joined the Association for Contemporary Music (ACM), an alternative organization of Russian composers interested in avant-garde music. This association met with opposition from the Russian Association of Proletarian Musicians (RAPM), which by the late 1920s had eclipsed the ACM in terms of cultural influence. The ACM was formally disbanded in 1931.

In 1934, Zaderatsky was once again exiled from Moscow and moved to Yaroslavl to work as a teacher at the city music school. From the autumn of 1936 onward, Stalin's brutal "purge waves" swept across the Soviet Union, leaving no sector untouched—including the cultural scene. In July 1937, Zaderatsky was reported to the authorities and taken into custody. He was charged with an offense under article 58 of spreading anti-Soviet propaganda and attempting to undermine the Soviet government. He received a 10-year sentence in a labor camp in Magadan Oblast in the Far East. Together with other victims of political repression he created an orchestral ensemble. After 1½ years, he was set free.

He relocated several times to cities outside the main music hubs. From 1945 he lived in Zhytomyr (Ukraine) then returned to Yaroslavl, and was a delegate to the first Congress of Soviet Composers in 1948.

From 1949 until his death in 1953, he lived in Lviv and worked at Lysenko Musical Academy.

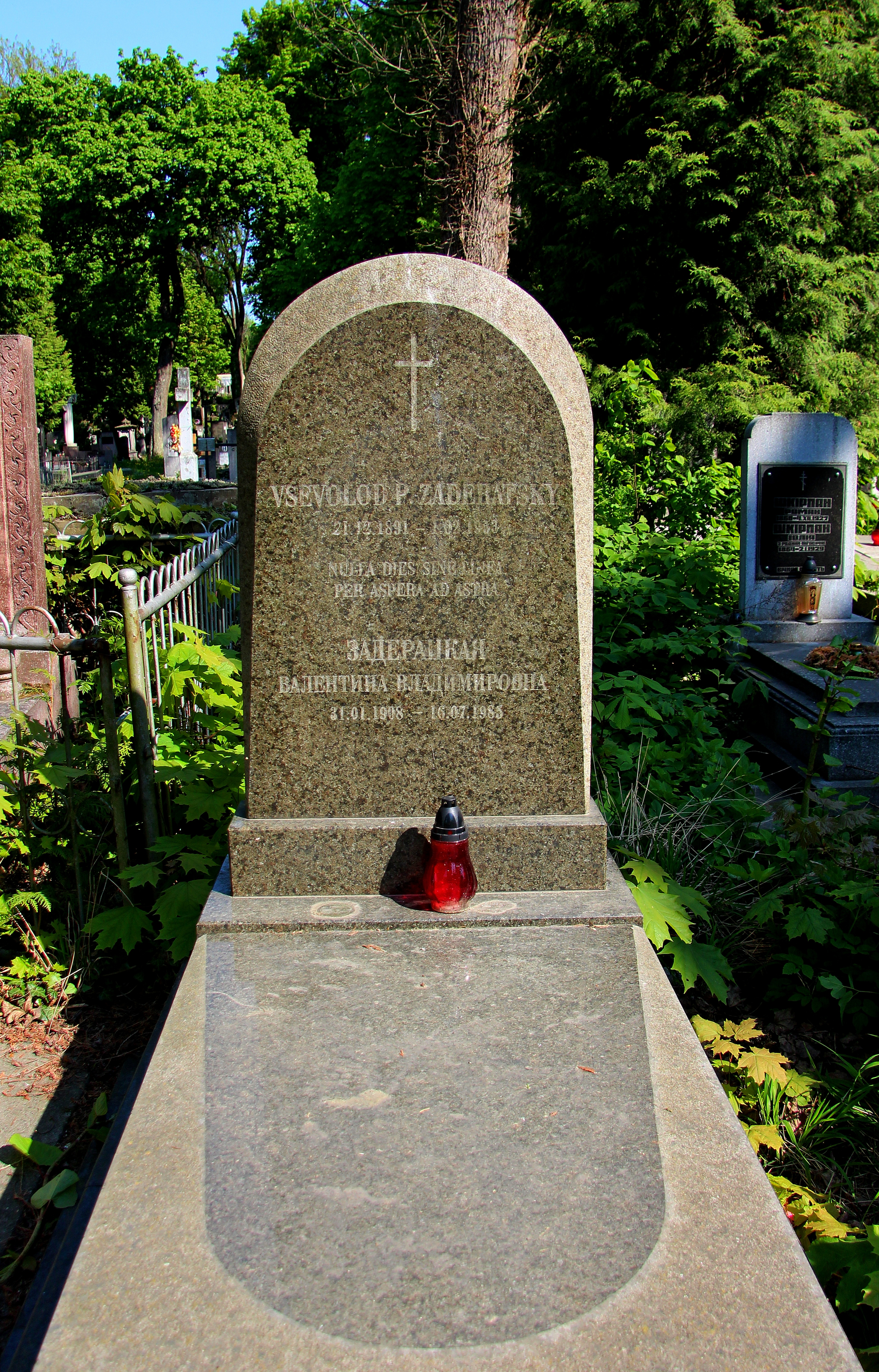
His tomb in Lviv

== Music ==
Zaderatsky's works, composed during the first half of the 20th century, reflected the dominant artistic movements of the time. His style ranged from experimental and modernist approaches to rigorously structured composition, as well as pieces reminiscent of the Romantic era. His early works (from before 1926) did not survive the actions of the Russian authorities.

In the early thirties, while in Moscow, he wrote the opera "Blood and Coal" (not preserved), the symphony "Fundament", the cycles of piano miniatures "Microbes of Lyricism" (1928), "Miniature Notebook" (1929), "Porcelain Cups" (1932), Lyrical Symphony (1932), the vocal cycle for bass "Grotesque of Ilya Selvinsky" (1931).

However, his most notable contributions are in piano music, which includes five sonatas, a suite, and the cycle "24 Preludes and Fugues" in all keys, composed while imprisoned in a labor camp between 1937 and 1938. The cycle demonstrates a sophisticated fusion of tradition and originality, integrating tonal structure with modernist harmonic and structural developments. Additionally, he wrote various smaller piano cycles and individual pieces.

Due to a decree by the Soviet government, Zaderatsky's music was banned from both performance and publication throughout his lifetime. However, Zaderatsky is widely recognized today, and his musical legacy is regarded as one of the most significant contributions to Russian and Ukrainian music in the first half of the 20th century. He is recognized as a pioneer of the Russian musical avant-garde, having, in many ways, anticipated the stylistic innovations later explored by Paul Hindemith and Dmitri Shostakovich. His works are performed by renowned musicians in prestigious concert halls and competitions worldwide, including in Ukraine, the United Kingdom, Germany, Switzerland, and Russia.

=== List of Works (chronological) ===
This list is likely partial, given the zeal with which he was persecuted by Soviet authorities.

- Mikrobï Liriki (Nuancen der Lirik) [?]
- Piano Miniatures [1928]
- Piano Sonata Nr 1, in one movement [1928]
- Piano Sonata Nr 2, in one movement [1928]
- Tetrad' miniatyur (Album of Miniatures, Miniaturenheft), piano [1929]
- Farforovïye chashki [Porcelain Cups, Porzellantasesen], piano [1932]
- Liricheskaya Simfoniyetta [Lyrical Sinfonietta], strings [1932]
- Blood and Coal, opera [1932?]
- Avtodor, symphonic suite [1932?]
- Symphony "The Foundation", orchestra (lost, only the slow movement survived) [1933]
- 24 Preludes, piano, [1934]
- Piano Sonata Nr 3 [1936]
- 24 Preludes and Fugues, piano [1937-38]
- Piano Sonata Nr 4, F minor [1939]
- Chamber Sinfonietta, piano & winds [1940]
- Piano Sonata Nr 5, E-flat minor(?) [1940]
- The Widow of Valencia, opera [1934-40]
- Legendï (Legends, Legenden), piano [1944]
- Front (Die Front), piano [1944]
- The Breath of War, ballad-cycle [1944]
- De Profundis, song-cycle [1944-45]
- Rodina [Homeland, Die Heimat], piano [1945]
- Piano Concerto Nr 1, "for children" [1948]
- Piano Concerto Nr 2, "for children" [1949]
- Symphony "Nr 1", C major, orchestra [1952]
- Violin Concerto, violin & orchestra (unorchestrated, piano score only?) [1952]
- Sonatina, piano [posthumous?, discovered 1985]

Performances of a few piano works are available on YouTube: https://www.youtube.com/results?search_query=Vsevolod+Zaderatsky

== Family ==
In 1914, Zaderatsky married Natalia Pasichnyk. In 1915, his first son, Rostyslav, was born. During the 1930s, Zaderatsky married for the second time and had a second son, Vsevolod Vsevolodovich Zaderatsky (Всеволод Всеволодович Задерацький, born 1935), who was a professor of the Moscow Conservatory. He wrote a book about his father: Per aspera...
