= Rimsky-Korsakov Monument =

Coordinates: 59°55′35″N 30°17′50″E

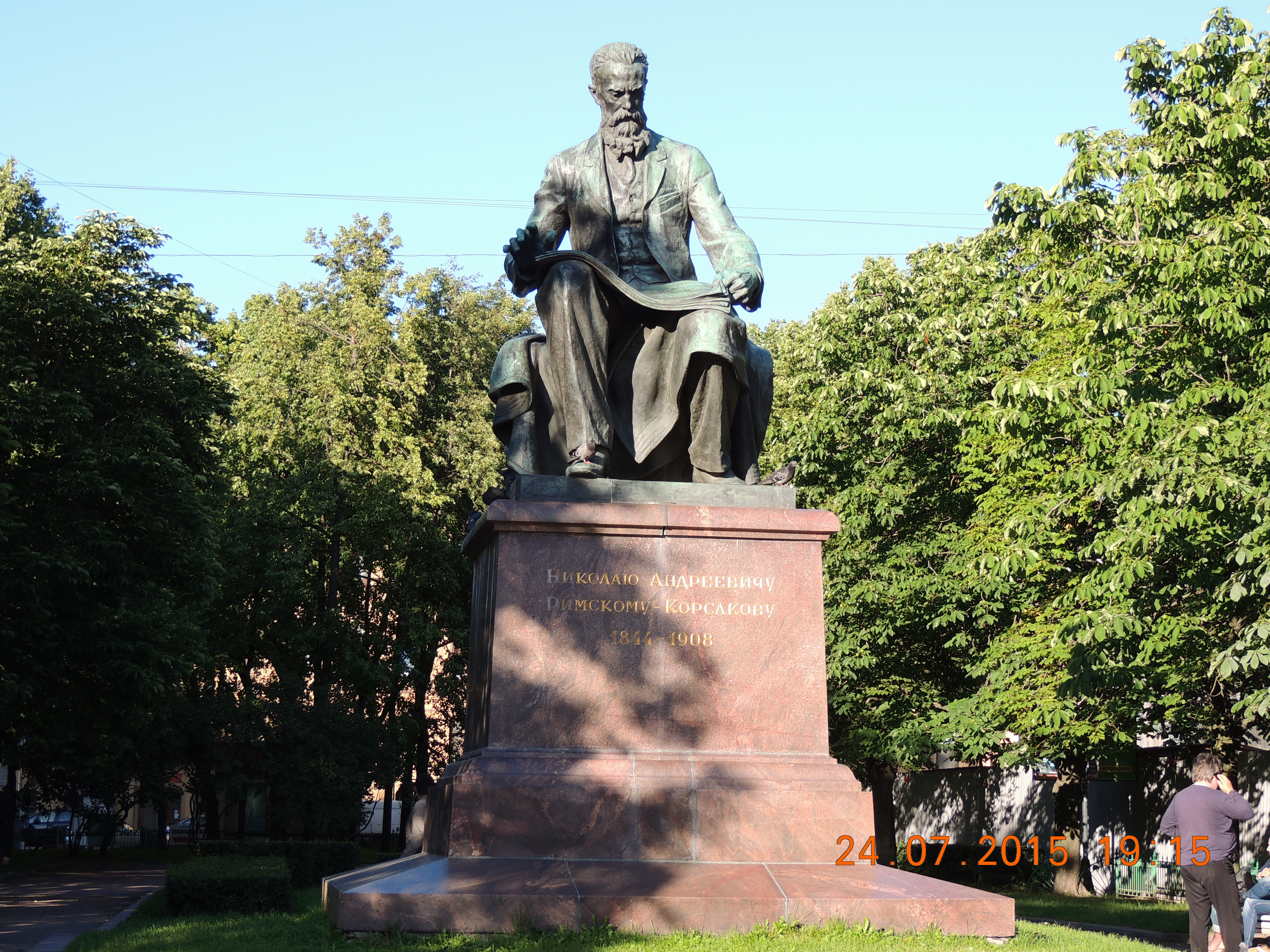
- Interactive map of Rimsky-Korsakov Monument
- Location: Saint Petersburg, Russia
- Type: Statue
- Material: Bronze
- Completion date: 1952
- Dedicated to: Nikolai Rimsky-Korsakov

The Rimsky-Korsakov monument (Russian: Памятник Римскому-Корсакову) is a bronze statue of Nikolai Rimsky-Korsakov (1844–1908), the Russian composer, teacher, conductor, public figure, music critic, and member of the "Mighty Handful".

The monument was erected in 1952 in Saint Petersburg (then known as Leningrad) in Theater Square in front of the N. A. Rimsky-Korsakov Saint Petersburg State Conservatory. Rimsky-Korsakov taught there for almost forty years.

The monument was created by sculptors V. Bogolyubov and V. Ingal, and architect M. Shepilevsky. The statue has been listed as a cultural monument.
