= Xenia Prochorowa =

Russian pianist (1915–1991)

- Ксения Прохорова
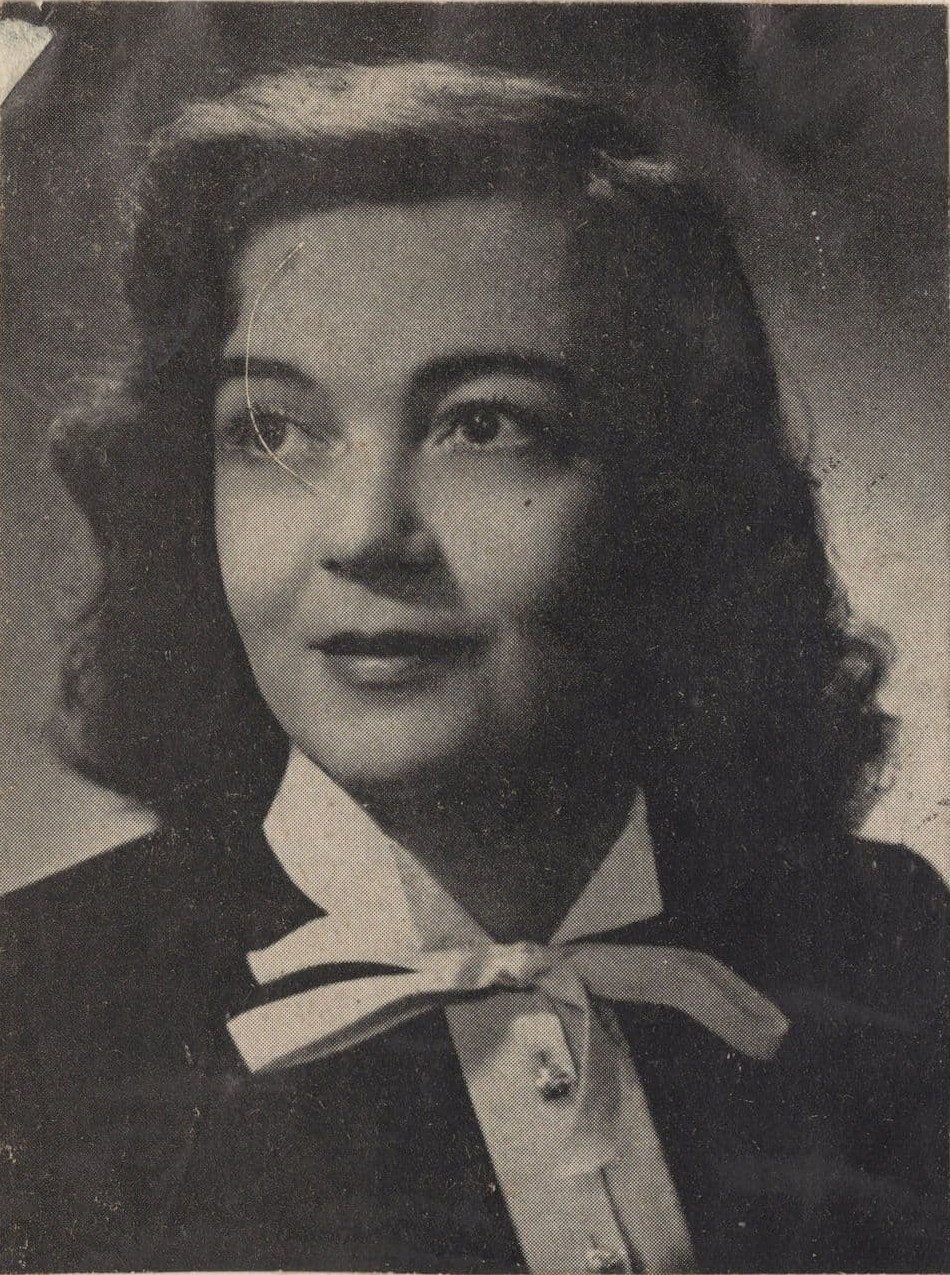
- Born: January 25, 1915; Moscow, Russia
- Died: July 6, 1991 (aged 76); San Francisco, California, U.S.
- Education: Moscow Conservatory
- Years active: 1934–1968

Signature
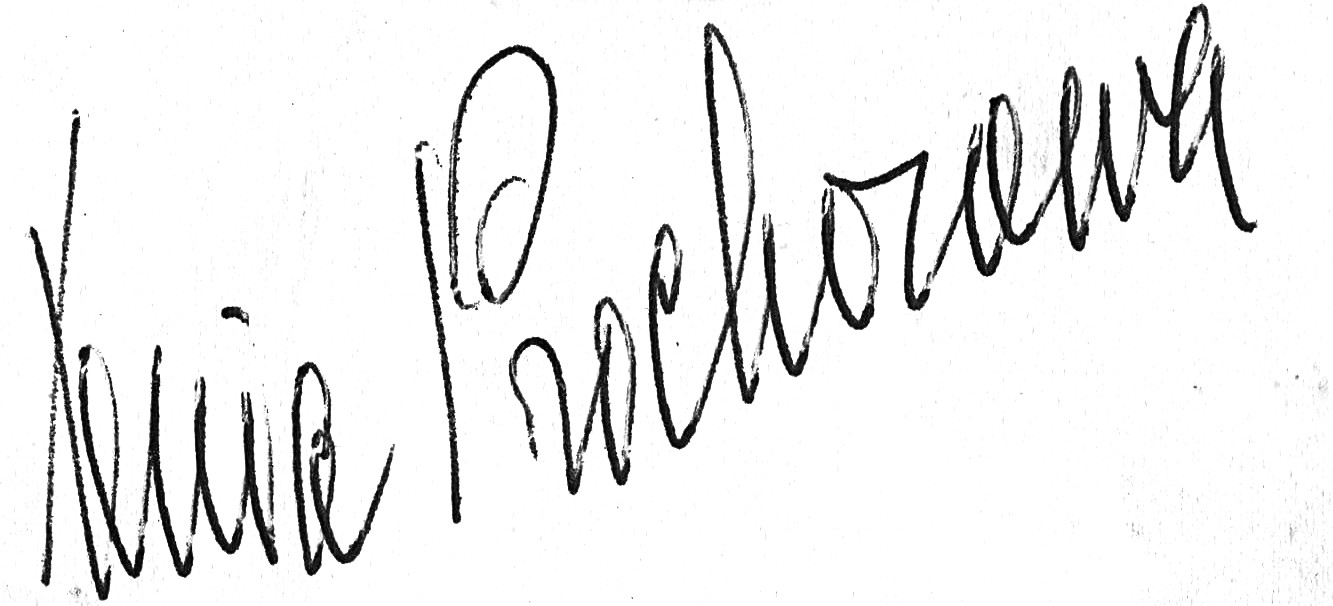

Xenia Prochorowa (January 25 [O.S. January 12] 1915 – July 6, 1991) was a Russian pianist. She competed in the first Franz Liszt International Piano Competition in Budapest in 1933 and performed across Latin America and Europe until 1968.

== Biography ==
Prochorowa was born in Moscow, then part of the Russian Empire, in 1915. She studied piano at the Moscow Conservatory under Karl Kipp, who taught virtuosic technique, and later with Nikolai Medtner.

She gained early acclaim as an interpreter of Franz Liszt in 1925. In 1933, she competed in the Franz Liszt International Piano Competition in Budapest, where she won a prize. Afterwards, she began performing concerts across Latin America from 1933 to 1952, and across Europe until 1963. She recorded a piano solo for Julio Bracho's Mexican film Twilight in 1945.

Her renditions of Russian classical music were published by the Haydn Society of Boston, and recordings of Tchaikovsky and Chopin were republished by Forgotten Records in 2017. A collection of her recordings, letters, and photographs is held in the Stanford University Libraries archive and the Library of Congress.

She was appointed a piano lecturer at the University of Cape Town College of Music in South Africa.

Prochorowa died on July 6, 1991 in San Francisco, aged 76.

== Personal life ==
She married Leo Allan Grönroos (1926–1971), a Finnish aviator.
