= Kemp Stillings =

American musician (1888–1967)

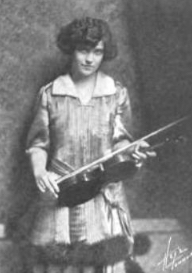
- Kemp Stillings and her violin, from a 1917 publication
- Born: Katharine Kemp Stillings; June 30, 1888; Roxbury, Massachusetts
- Died: April 30, 1967 (aged 78); New York City
- Occupations: Violinist, music educator

Katharine Kemp Stillings (June 30, 1888 – April 30, 1967) was a violinist, composer, and music educator.

== Early life ==
Katharine Kemp Stillings was born in Roxbury, Massachusetts, and began studying violin from a very early age. She went to Berlin to study with Joseph Joachim, and to Saint Petersburg for further studies with Leopold Auer.

== Career ==
Katherine Stillings performed in Russia and Finland before World War I. She played with pianist Frances Nash in 1917 and 1918, in New York and several other American cities, and was a guest soloist with the St. Louis Symphony Orchestra and the Milwaukee Symphony Orchestra. She toured in South America in 1920.

Stillings became suddenly blind in the 1920s, and after that focused on teaching. "It has been a handicap, but also a blessing," she told an interviewer in 1940. "It has made my critical hearing ever so much more acute. Besides, something like this makes us so human." She was on the faculty at the New Jersey College for Women from 1927 to 1952, and taught her own master classes in New York City, which were modeled on the pedagogy of Joachim and Auer. Her students included conductor Walter Eisenberg.

Stillings published violin exercise books for children, The Great Adventure (1928), At the Crossroads (1929), and The Giant Talks (1929), and wrote compositions with titles like "Take a Little Eighth Note", "Tick Tock", and "Double Meaning". She also took an interest in cookery, sharing recipes for fruit dishes with a newspaper in 1940.

== Personal life ==
Kemp Stillings died in 1967, at her home in New York City.
