= Aleksandr Verzhbilovich =

Russian cellist of Polish descent (1850–1911)

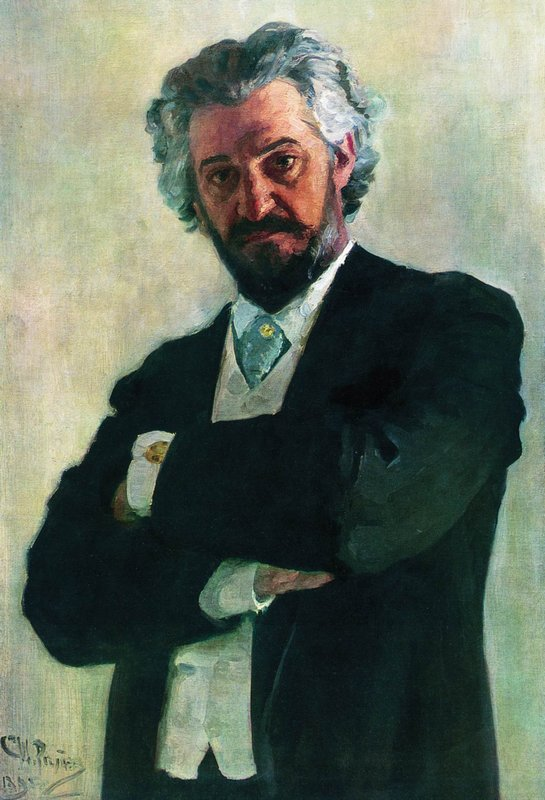
Aleksandr Verzhbilovich by Ilya Repin, 1895

Aleksandr Valerianovich Verzhbilovich (Russian: Александр Валерианович Вержбилович; 8 January 1850 [O.S. 27 December 1849] – 15 March [O.S. 2 March] 1911) was a Russian classical cellist of Polish descent.

His name also appears as Verzhbilovic, Verzhibilovic, Vierzbilovich, Wierzbillowicz, Wierzbiłłowicz, Wierzbilovich, Wierzbilovicz, and Wierzbilowicz. His first name is sometimes given as Anton.

== Life and work ==
Verzhbilovich had a Polish father, spent a considerable time performing concerts in Poland during his career, and at least one major source says he was born in Warsaw and was educated there. These would explain why various references refer to him as a Polish musician. However, the preponderance of sources say he was born and died in Russia, and was based in that country throughout his life.

Aleksandr Verzhbilovich was born in Saint Petersburg on 8 January 1850 (ns). He was a student of Karl Davydov at the Saint Petersburg Conservatory. He was quickly recognised as an outstanding performer, and appeared in concert with names such as Anton Rubinstein, Vasily Safonov, Alexander Siloti, Anna Yesipova, Felix Blumenfeld, Sergei Rachmaninoff, Hieronymus Weickmann, Leopold Auer and others. He often travelled to Poland, where he was a specialist in music for cello solo, but always concluded his recitals with trios with the violinist Stanisław Barcewicz and the pianist Aleksander Michałowski.

From 1877 to 1882 he was principal cello at the Italian Opera. From 1882 to 1885 he was principal cello at the Russian Imperial Opera Orchestra. He was also a member of the Saint Petersburg String Quartet.

From 1882 to 1885 and again 1887–1911 he was a professor at the Conservatory, where his pupils included Leopold Rostropovich (father of Mstislav Rostropovich), Alexey Davydov (nephew of Karl Davydov), Semyon Kozolupov (teacher of Sviatoslav Knushevitsky), Raymond Bööcke and others.

Aleksandr Verzhbilovich had a significant association and friendship with Pyotr Ilyich Tchaikovsky. When writing his Sextet in D minor, Op, 70, Souvenir de Florence, Tchaikovsky wanted Verzhbilovich's advice on the first cello part. While in Saint Petersburg for rehearsals of The Queen of Spades, Tchaikovsky arranged an audition of the Sextet at the Hotel Rossiya, for a small invited audience including Anatoly Lyadov, Alexander Glazunov and Herman Laroche, the performers including Verzhbilovich. Tchaikovsky was not entirely happy with how the work was proceeding, and decided to rewrite the Scherzo and Finale.

Shortly after Tchaikovsky's death, Verzhbilovich attended his apartment, apparently in a drunken state. According to Nikolai Rimsky-Korsakov's memoirs, he kissed the late composer profusely on the face, despite the cholera that had killed him. However, some doubt has been shed on the reliability of Rimsky's memory in this report.

In 1902, in St. Petersburg, he became the first person to record any of the music of Johann Sebastian Bach – the "Air" from the Ouverture No. 3 in D major, BWV 1068, arranged for cello and piano (the pianist's name was not recorded). He made a handful of other 78 rpm sides.

The following works were dedicated to him:

- Alexander Glazunov:
  - Mélodie (Op. 20, No. 1) and Sérénade Espagnole (Op. 20, No. 2), for cello and piano
  - Chant du Ménestrel, Op. 71, for cello and orchestra
- David Popper:
  - Serenata Oriental, Op. 18
  - Spanish Dances, Op. 54
- some works by Eduard Nápravník.

He transcribed some pieces by Tchaikovsky and others for cello, and wrote a small number of original minor works himself (Waltz, Étude, etc.).

Aleksandr Verzhbilovich died in the city of his birth on 15 March 1911 (ns), aged 61.
