= Eduard Langer =

Russian pianist and composer (1835–1905)

- Эдуард Лангер
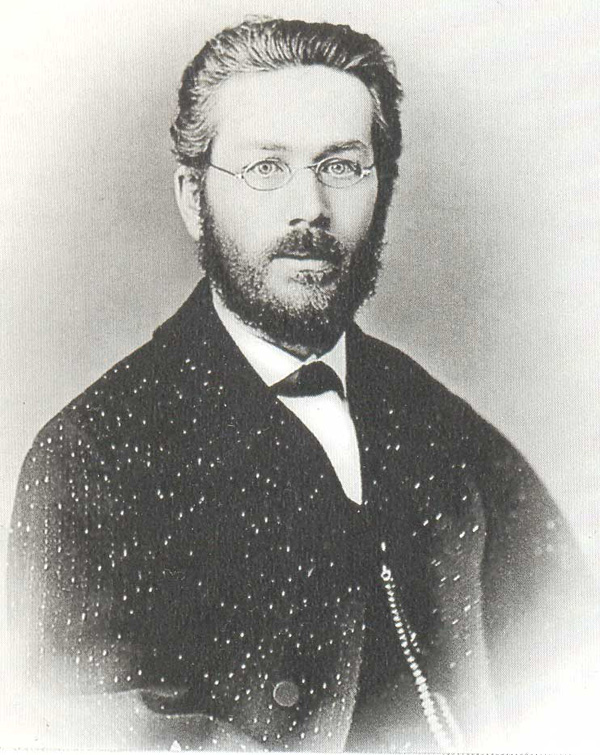
- Born: May 3, 1835; Moscow, Russia
- Died: May 7, 1905 (aged 70); Moscow, Russia
- Education: Leipzig Conservatory
- Years active: 1860–1905

Eduard Leopoldovich (Leontyevich) Langer (May 3 [O.S. April 21] 1835 – May 7 [O.S. April 24] 1905) was a Russian and Swiss pianist, teacher, and composer. He wrote a string quartet, piano trio, and two sonatas for violin and piano. He taught at the Russian Musical Society and Moscow Conservatory from 1860 until his death.

Langer is best known for arranging many of Tchaikovsky's works for piano. Tchaikovsky dedicated his Capriccioso from Six Pieces, Op. 19 to him in 1873.

== Early life and education ==
Langer was born in Moscow, Russia, in 1835. His father Leopold Langer (1802–1885) was a Swiss German organist. He began studying music as a child under his father's guidance.

In 1851, Langer left Russia for Austria to attend the Leipzig Conservatory. There, he studied piano under Ignaz Moscheles and Ernst Wenzel and composition under Moritz Hauptmann and Julius Rietz until 1853.

== Career ==
After returning to Russia from Leipzig, Langer began teaching. In 1860, he was invited by Nikolai Rubinstein to teach piano and music theory at the Russian Musical Society in Moscow. Six years later, he became a professor of piano at the Moscow Conservatory. He also headed organ at the conservatory from 1885 to 1890. In August 1893, he briefly moved to the Moscow Philharmonic Orchestra before returning to the conservatory in April of the following year. His most notable students include the renowned virtuoso teacher Karl Kipp, composer Sergei Taneyev, cellist Anatoliy Brandukov, and Antonina Miliukova, who later married Tchaikovsky.

Langer transcribed the orchestral and symphonic works of Russian composers including Mikhail Glinka, Alexander Dargomyzhsky, Anton Arensky, and Nikolai Rubinstein for piano in two, four, and eight hands. His most notable transcriptions are those of Tchaikovsky, his friend and colleague at the conservatory who dedicated his Capriccioso (op. 19 no. 5) to Langer in 1873.

Two letters sent from Tchaikovsky survive, one from April 1880 in Saint Petersburg and another from September 1880 in Kamenka, Russia. In the latter, Tchaikovsky asks for his aid in republishing 4-hand arrangements of Symphony No. 1, Symphony No. 3, and The Tempest.

He died on May 7, 1905, in Moscow, aged 70.

== Personal life ==
Langer married Amalia Katharina Dempt, with whom had a son, Moritz Otto-Leopold, and a daughter, Ekaterina. He was friends with Karl Klindworth, who like Langer was an admirer of Richard Wagner's music.

He was a Lutheran. He began playing organ at Protestant churches in Moscow in 1855.
