= Grigory Pirogov =

Russian opera singer

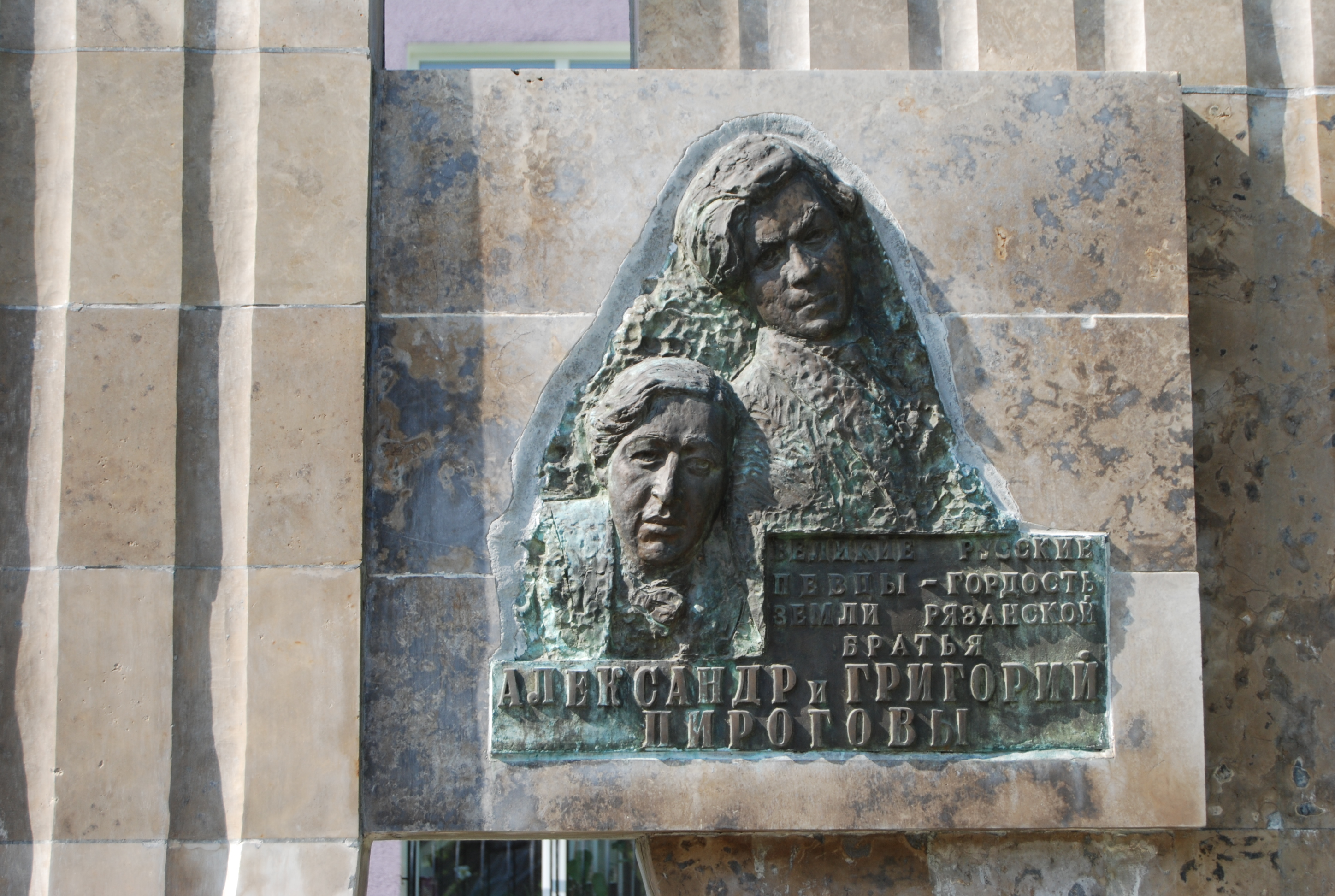

Grigory Stepanovich Pirogov (Григорий Степанович Пирогов) (Ryazan January 24, 1885 – February 20, 1931) was a bass opera singer.

Grigory was born in the village of Novoselki, Ryazan, one of four of five brothers who became singers, most notably including his younger brother Alexander Pirogov who from 1924 to 1954 was one of the bass soloists of the Bolshoi Theatre. Grigory also had earlier performed at the Bolshoi.

Grigory notably followed basses Nikolay Speransky (premiere 1909) and Vasily Osipov (Bolshoi 1909) in performing the role of King Dodon in Rimsky-Korsakov's opera The Golden Cockerel. As a soloist he gave recitals with pianists including Vsevolod Zaderatsky.

A river cruiseship Grigory Pirogov (built 1961) is named after the singer.

== Discography ==
Surviving recordings from 78s.

- 8 arias and songs by Grigory Pirogov with 12 by Alexander Pirogov. Aquarius AQVR 315

=== Track list ===
1. Aria of the Unknown Man. from Verstovsky's "Askold's Grave".
2. Serenade of Mephistopheles from Gounod's "Faust".
3. Stanzas of Nilakantu from Delibes' "Lakme".
4. As the king went to war (Как король шел на войну) music: Fyodor Keneman, text: Maria Konopnicka.
5. Dubinushka (Дубинушка, Russian folk song).
6. Song of the wretched wanderer (Песня убогого странника, music: Nikolai Manikin-Nevstruev (1869–?) Conductor: Nikolai Nekrasov.
7. You come up, red sun (Ты взойди, солнце красное, Russian folk song, arr. Mikhail Akimovich Slonov.
8. Sidste Reis / The Last Voyage, Op. 17 no 2 by Eyvind Alnæs from the Norwegian into Russian (Последний рейс) arr. Slonov.
