= Saint Petersburg Conservatory =

Music school in Saint Petersburg, Russia

N. A. Rimsky-Korsakov Saint Petersburg State Conservatory
- Russian: Санкт-Петербургская государственная консерватория имени Н. А. Римского-Корсакова
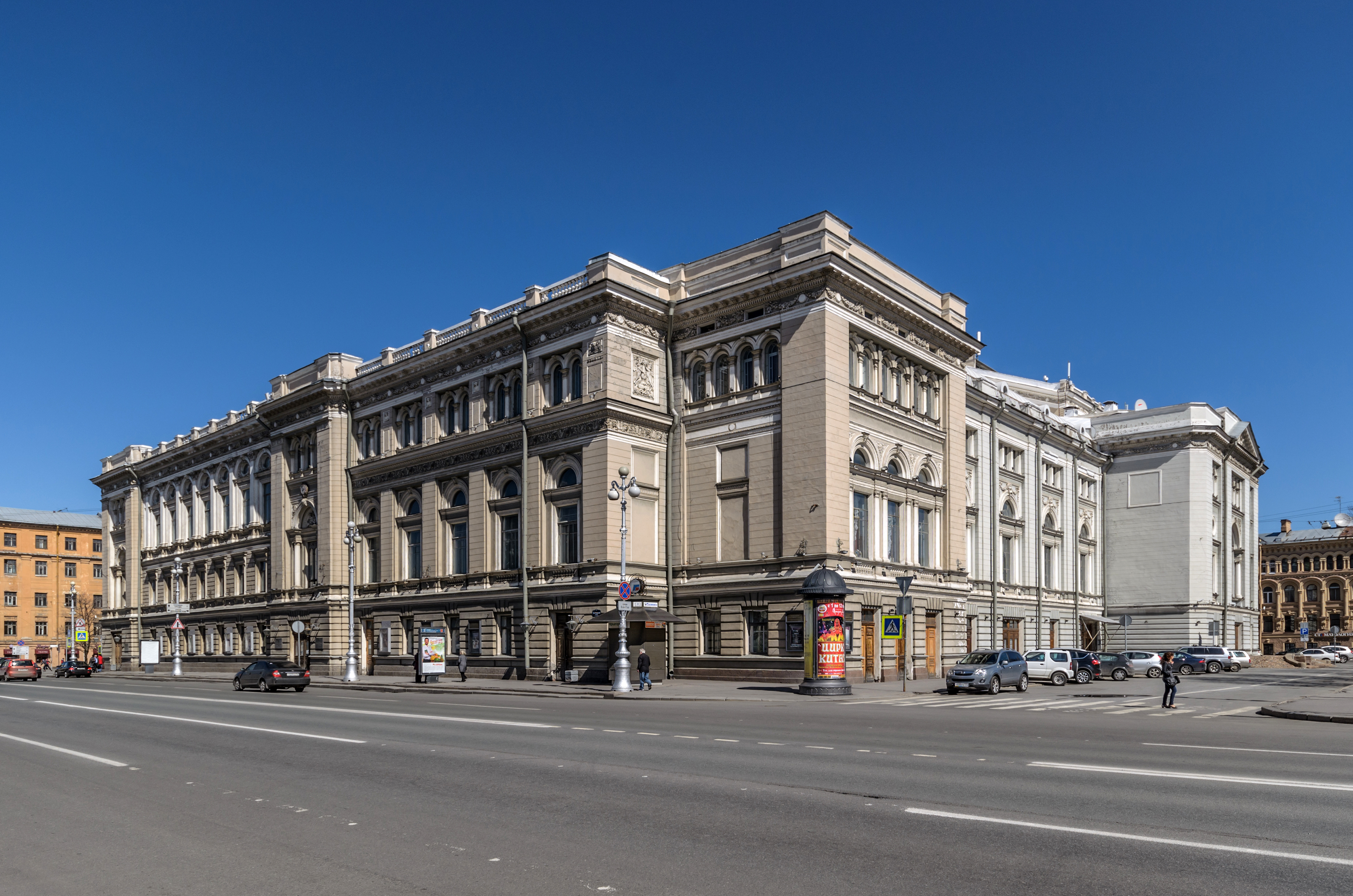
- The conservatory, as seen in 2013

Location
- Saint Petersburg, Russia; 59.9260°N 30.2982°E

Information
- Former names: Petrograd Conservatory; Leningrad Conservatory
- Type: Music school
- Established: 1862 (164 years ago)
- Founders: Russian Music Society; Anton Rubinstein
- Website: conservatory.ru/en

The N. A. Rimsky-Korsakov Saint Petersburg State Conservatory (Russian: Санкт-Петербургская государственная консерватория имени Н. А. Римского-Корсакова) (formerly known as the Petrograd Conservatory and Leningrad Conservatory) is a school of music in Saint Petersburg, Russia. In 2013, the conservatory had around 400 faculty members and over 1,300 students.

== History and operations ==
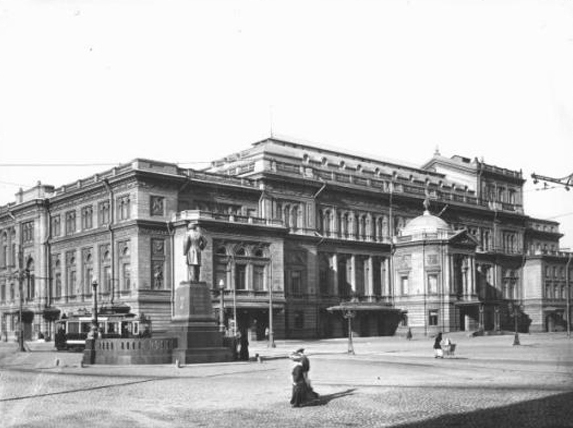
Theatre Square and the conservatory, as seen in 1913

The conservatory was founded in 1862 by the Russian Music Society and Anton Rubinstein, a Russian pianist and composer. On his resignation in 1867, he was succeeded by Nikolai Zaremba. Nikolai Rimsky-Korsakov was appointed as a professor in 1871, and the conservatory has borne his name since 1944, the centenary of his birth. In 1887, Rubinstein returned to the conservatory with the goal of improving overall standards. He revised the curriculum, expelled inferior students, fired and demoted many professors, and made entrance and examination requirements more stringent. In 1891, he resigned again over the Imperial demand of racial quotas.

The current building was erected in the 1890s on the site of the old Bolshoi Theatre of Saint Petersburg. As the city changed its name in the 20th century, the conservatory was renamed Petrograd Conservatory (Петроградская консерватория) and Leningrad Conservatory (Ленинградская консерватория).

School alumni have included such composers as Pyotr Ilyich Tchaikovsky, Sergei Prokofiev, Artur Kapp, Rudolf Tobias, and Dmitri Shostakovich, who taught at the conservatory during the 1960s. Amongst his pupils were German Okunev and Boris Tishchenko. Composer Nikolai Rimsky-Korsakov taught at the conservatory for almost forty years, and his bronze monument is located outside the building in Theatre Square. The youngest musician ever admitted to the conservatory was four-year-old violinist Clara Rockmore, who later became one of the world's foremost theremin players.

== Directors and rectors ==
- Anton Rubinstein (1862–1867 and 1887–1891)
- Nikolai Zaremba (1867–1871)
- Mikhail Azanchevsky (1871–1876)
- Karl Davydov (1876–1887)
- Julius Johannsen (1891–1897)
- Auguste Bernhard (1897–1905)
- Alexander Glazunov (1905–1928) (formally 1930) – rector
- Aleksey Mashirov (1930–1933)
- Veniamin Buchstein (1935–1936)
- Boris Zagursky (1936–1939) – rector
- Pavel Serebryakov (1939–1952, 1962–1977)
- Yuri Bryushkov (1952–1962)
- Yuri Bolshiyanov (1977–1979)
- Vladislav Chernushenko (1979–2002)
- Sergei Roldugin (2002–2004)
- Alexander Chaikovsky (2004–2008)
- Sergei Stadler (2008–2011)
- Mikhail Gantvarg (2011–2015)
- Aleksey Vasilyev (since 2015)

== Notable faculty ==
- Boris Abalyan (conducting)
- Leopold Auer (violin)
- Vladimir Bakaleinikov (viola)
- Louis Brassin (piano)
- Vitaly Bujanovsky (French Horn)
- Alexander Famitsin (musicology, composition)
- Georgiy Ginovker (cello, chamber music)
- Edouard Grikurov (conducting)
- Artur Lemba (piano)
- Theodor Leschetizky (piano)
- Alexander Ossovsky (musicology, history)
- Nikolai Malko (conducting)
- Ilya Musin (conducting)
- Leonid Nikolayev (piano)
- Cesare Pugni (violin, counterpoint, composition)
- Alexander Radvilovich (composition)
- Nikolai Rimsky-Korsakov (composition, orchestration)
- Anton Rubinstein (piano, the history of piano literature)
- Karl Bogdànovich Schuberth (cello)
- Dmitri Shostakovich (composition)
- Sergei Slonimsky (composition)
- Vladimir Sofronitsky – piano
- Nikolai Tcherepnin (conducting)
- Boris Tishchenko (composition)
- Aleksandr Verzhbilovich (cello)
- Zino Vinnikov (violin)
- Jāzeps Vītols (composition)
- Hieronymus Weickmann (viola)
- Henryk Wieniawski (violin)
- Alexander Winkler (piano)
- Anna Yesipova (piano)
- Nikolai Zaremba (composition, harmony)
- Anatoly Zatin (composition, orchestration, chamber music)
- Leah Zelikhman (piano)
- Henri Vieuxtemps (violin)

== Notable graduates ==
=== A–M ===
- Anton Arensky – composer
- George Balanchine – choreographer
- Alexander Barantschik – violin
- Semyon Barmotin – pianist, composer, teacher
- Sidor Belarsky – operatic basso, educator
- Richard Burgin – violinist, conductor
- Semyon Bychkov – conductor
- Gayane Chebotaryan – composer, pianist, musicologist
- Joseph Cherniavsky – cellist, conductor
- Peter Chernobrivets – composer, musicologist
- Leonid Desyatnikov – composer
- Sergei Diaghilev – impresario
- Sandra Drouker – pianist
- Heino Eller – composer
- Valery Gergiev – conductor
- Jascha Heifetz – violinist
- Aida Huseynova – musicologist and ethnomusicologist
- Alexander Ilyinsky – music teacher and composer
- Mariss Jansons – conductor
- Alfrēds Kalniņš – composer, organist
- Emina Kamberović – ballet dancer, choreographer, teacher
- Artur Kapp – composer
- Leokadiya Kashperova – pianist, composer
- Alexander Kashpurin – pianist, conductor
- Yuri Khanon – composer, writer, laureate of the European Film Awards.
- Eduard Khil – singer
- Vladimir Khomyakov – pianist
- Nadine Koutcher – opera singer
- Gustav Kross – pianist
- Miroslav Kultyshev – pianist
- Eugene Levinson – double bassist
- Anatoly Lyadov – composer, teacher, conductor
- Sasha Mäkilä – Finnish conductor
- Witold Maliszewski – Polish composer, teacher, public figure
- Nathan Milstein – violinist
- Nikolai Myaskovsky – composer

=== N–Z ===
- Nevsky String Quartet
- Tomomi Nishimoto – conductor
- Nikolai Obukhov – composer
- Leo Ornstein – composer
- Edina Papo – ballet dancer, choreographer, teacher
- Gavriil Popov – composer
- Sergei Prokofiev – composer, pianist, conductor
- Gal Rasché – conductor, pianist, teacher
- Lauma Reinholde – composer, pianist, teacher
- Nadia Reisenberg – pianist
- Clara Rockmore – violin prodigy, theremin performer
- Livery Antonovich Sacchetti – Russian music historian
- David Serero – opera singer
- Ilya Serov – trumpeter
- Don Shirley – pianist, arranger, composer
- Dmitri Shostakovich – composer, pianist
- Nadezhda Simonyan – composer
- Kuldar Sink – composer, flautist
- Vladimir Sofronitsky – pianist
- Grigory Sokolov – pianist
- Ilza Sternicka-Niekrasz – pianist, composer
- Lyubov Streicher – composer
- Pyotr Ilyich Tchaikovsky – composer
- Yuri Temirkanov – conductor
- Dimitri Tiomkin – pianist, composer
- Elena Tsallagova – soprano
- Vera Vinogradova – pianist, composer
- Zino Vinnikov – violinist
- Solomon Volkov – musicologist
- Ivan Yershov – singer
- Anna Yesipova – pianist
- Mikhail Youdin – composer
- Maria Yudina – pianist
- Aleksandra Zakharina (married name Aleksandra Unkovskaya) – violinist, pedagogue, conductor, musicologist
- Stefania Anatolyevna Zaranek – composer
- Anatoly Zatin – comhyposer, pianist, conductor
- Valery Zhelobinsky – pianist, composer
- Efrem Zimbalist – violinist

== See also ==
- Free Music School
