= Leopold Auer =

Hungarian violinist, academic, conductor, composer, and teacher (1845–1930)

Leopold von Auer
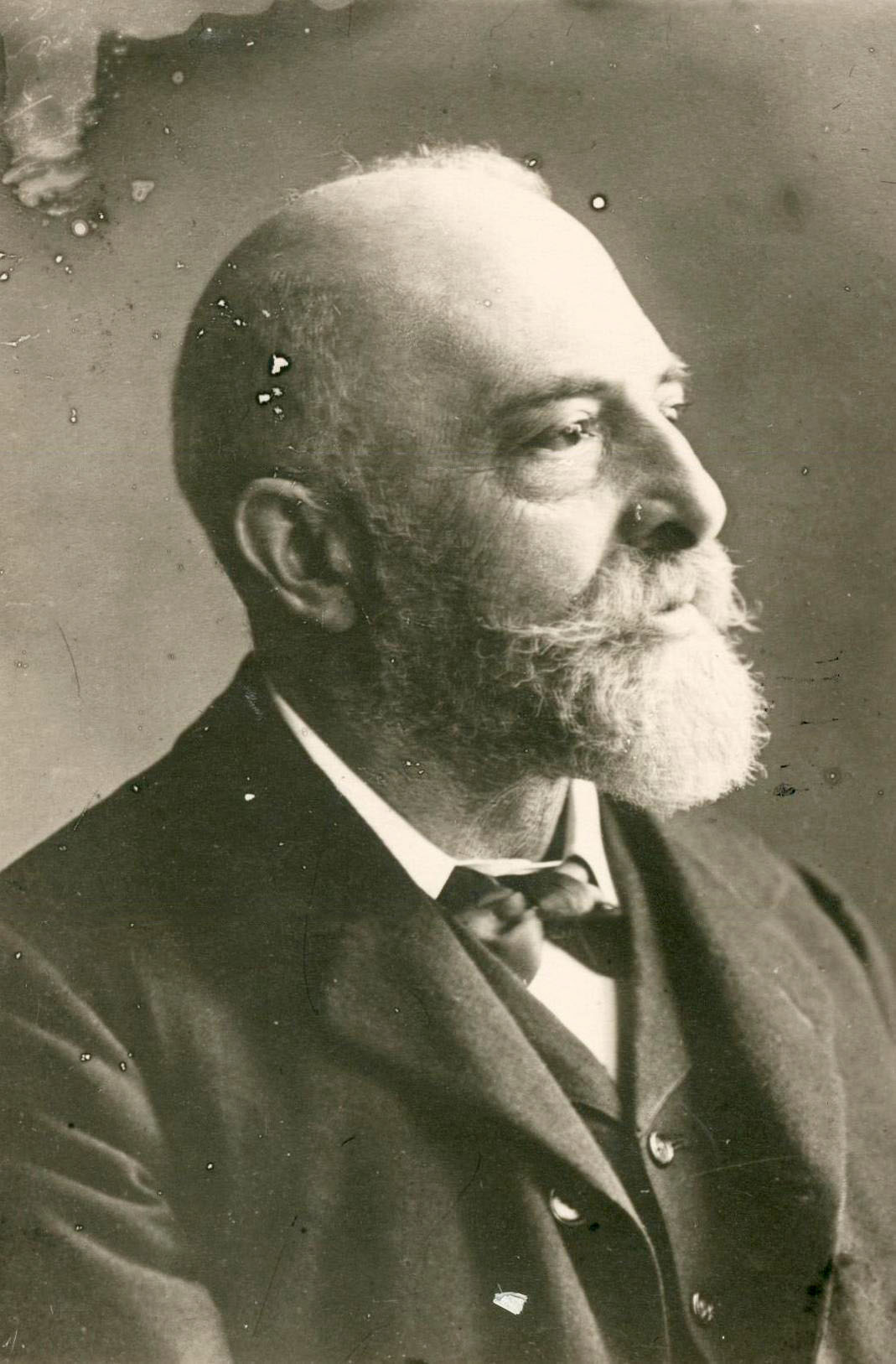
- Born: Leopold Auer; June 7, 1845; Veszprém, Kingdom of Hungary
- Died: July 15, 1930 (aged 85); Loschwitz, Germany
- Resting place: Ferncliff Cemetery
- Occupations: Violinist; academic; conductor; composer
- Years active: 1858-1930

Leopold von Auer (Hungarian: Auer Lipót; June 7, 1845 – July 15, 1930) was a Hungarian violinist, academic, conductor, composer, and instructor. Many of his students went on to become prominent concert performers and teachers.

== Early life and career ==
Auer was born in Veszprém, Hungary, 7 June 1845, to a poor Jewish household of painters. He first studied violin with a local concertmaster. He later wrote that the violin was a "logical instrument" for any (musically inclined) Hungarian boy to take up because it "didn't cost much." At the age of 8 Auer continued his violin studies with Dávid Ridley-Kohne, who also came from Veszprém, at the Budapest Conservatory. Kohne was concertmaster of the orchestra of the National Opera. A performance by Auer as soloist in the Mendelssohn violin concerto attracted the interest of some wealthy music lovers, who gave him a scholarship to go to Vienna for further study. He lived at the home of his teacher, Jakob Dont. Auer wrote that it was Dont who taught him the foundation for his violin technique. In Vienna he also attended quartet classes with Joseph Hellmesberger, Sr.

By the time Auer was 13, the scholarship money had run out. His father decided to launch his career. The income from provincial concerts was barely enough to keep father and son, and a pianist who formed a duo with Leopold, out of poverty. An audition with Henri Vieuxtemps in Graz was a failure, partly because Vieuxtemps' wife thought so. A visit to Paris proved equally unsuccessful. Auer decided to seek the advice of Joseph Joachim, then royal concertmaster at Hanover. The then king of Hanover was blind and very fond of music. He paid Joachim very well, and on those occasions when Auer also performed for the king, he was also paid enough to support him for a few weeks. The two years Auer spent with Joachim (1861–63, or 1863-1865 according to Auer, 1980, p. 9) proved a turning point in his career. He was already well prepared as a violinist. What proved revelatory was exposure to the world of German music making—a world that stresses musical values over virtuoso glitter. Auer later wrote,

Joachim was an inspiration to me, and opened before my eyes horizons of that greater art of which until then I had lived in ignorance. With him I worked not only with my hands, but with my head as well, studying the scores of the masters, and endeavoring to penetrate the very heart of their works.... I [also] played a great deal of chamber music with my fellow students.

Auer spent the summer of 1864 at the spa village of Wiesbaden, where he had been hired to perform. There he met violinist Henryk Wieniawski and pianist brothers Anton Rubinstein and Nicholas Rubinstein, later founder and director of the Moscow Conservatory and conductor of the Moscow Symphony Orchestra. Auer received some informal instruction from Wieniawski. In the summer of 1865 Auer was in another spa village, Baden-Baden, where he met Clara Schumann, Brahms, and Johann Strauss Jr.

There were not so many touring violinists then as there were later, but in Vienna Auer was able to hear Henri Vieuxtemps from Belgium, Antonio Bazzini from Italy, and the Czech Ferdinand Laub; he was especially impressed by Vieuxtemps. Auer gave concerts in 1864 as soloist with the Leipzig Gewandhaus Orchestra, invited by concertmaster Ferdinand David, conductor Felix "Mendelssohn's friend." At that time, Auer says, Leipzig was "more important, from a musical point of view, than Berlin and even Vienna." Success led to his becoming, at the age of 19, concertmaster in Düsseldorf. In 1866 he got the same position in Hamburg; he also led a string quartet there.

During May and June 1868, Auer was engaged to play a series of concerts in London. In one concert, he played Beethoven's Archduke Trio with pianist Anton Rubinstein and cellist Alfredo Piatti.

== Russia ==
Rubinstein was in search for a violin professor for the Saint Petersburg Conservatory, which he had founded in 1862, and he proposed Auer. Auer agreed to a three-year contract, also as soloist at the court of Grand Duchess Helena. At first, music critics in St. Petersburg harshly criticized Auer's playing and compared it unfavorably with that of his predecessor, Wieniawski. But Tchaikovsky's admiration for Auer's playing led to its acceptance. Auer would stay for 49 years (1868-1917). During that time he held the position of first violinist to the orchestra of the St. Petersburg Imperial Theatres. This included the principal venue of the Imperial Ballet and Opera, the Imperial Bolshoi Kamenny Theatre (until 1886), and later the Imperial Mariinsky Theatre, as well as the Imperial Theatres of Peterhof and the Hermitage. Until 1906, Auer played almost all of the violin solos in the ballets performed by the Imperial Ballet, the majority of which were choreographed by Marius Petipa. Before Auer, Vieuxtemps and Wieniawski had played the ballet solos.

Until 1906, Auer was also leader of the string quartet for the Russian Musical Society (RMS). This quartet's concerts were as integral a part of the Saint Petersburg musical scene as their counterparts led by Joachim in Berlin. Criticism arose in later years of less-than-perfect ensemble playing and insufficient attention to contemporary Russian music. Nevertheless, Auer's group performed quartets by Tchaikovsky, Alexander Borodin, Alexander Glazunov and Nikolai Rimsky-Korsakov. The group also played music by Johannes Brahms and Robert Schumann, along with Louis Spohr, Joachim Raff and other lesser known German composers.

Sometime around 1870, Auer decided to convert to Russian Christian Orthodoxy.

At the Conservatory, the leading piano teacher Theodor Leschetizky introduced Auer to Anna Yesipova, who Leschetizky said was his best student. Auer performed sonatas with many great pianists, but his favorite recital partner was Yesipova, with whom he appeared until her death in 1914. Other partners included Anton Rubinstein, Leschetizky, Raoul Pugno, Sergei Taneyev and Eugen d'Albert. One sonata Auer liked to perform was Tartini's "Devil's Trill" Sonata, written about 1713. In the 1890s, Auer performed cycles of all 10 Beethoven violin sonatas. A particular favorite of Auer's was the 'Kreutzer' sonata, which Auer had first heard performed in Hanover by Joachim and Clara Schumann.

From 1914 to 1917, on concert tours of Russia, Auer was accompanied by the pianist Wanda Bogutska Stein.

== America ==
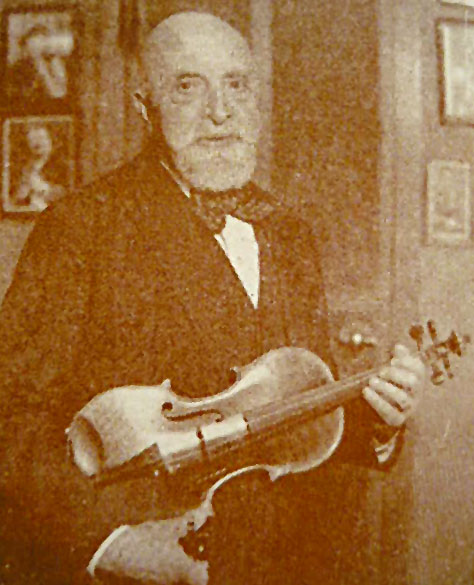
Leopold Auer in the USA

Up through 1917, Auer did not perform in the United States. He said there was "one serious deterrent — the great number of concerts exacted of the artist in a brief period of three or four months. My friends, Anton Rubinstein, Hans von Bülow. and Henri Wieniawski told [me] that, although their American tours had been most interesting, they were reluctant to accept new engagements because of the severe strain" their tours had been for them. "But in 1918...work in Russia became impossible because of the" Russian Revolution. He then moved to the United States, although because of his age, he did not undertake a wide concert tour. He played at Carnegie Hall on March 23, 1918 and also performed in Boston, Chicago and Philadelphia. He taught some private students at his home on Manhattan's Upper West Side. In 1926 he joined the Institute of Musical Art (later to become the Juilliard School). In 1928 he joined the faculty of the Curtis Institute of Music in Philadelphia. He died in 1930 in Loschwitz, a suburb of Dresden, Germany, and was interred in the Ferncliff Cemetery in Hartsdale, New York.

== Playing ==
Pyotr Ilyich Tchaikovsky was especially taken with Auer's playing. Reviewing an 1874 appearance in Moscow, Tchaikovsky praised Auer's "great expressivity, the thoughtful finesse and poetry of the interpretation." This finesse and poetry came at a tremendous price. Auer suffered as a performer from poorly formed hands. He had to work incessantly, with an iron determination, just to keep his technique in shape. He wrote, "My hands are so weak and their conformation is so poor that when I have not played the violin for several successive days, and then take up the instrument, I feel as if I had altogether lost the facility of playing."

Despite this handicap, Auer achieved much through constant work. His tone was small but ingratiating, his technique polished and elegant. His playing lacked fire, but he made up for it with a classic nobility. After he arrived in the United States, he made some recordings which bear this out. They show the violinist in excellent shape technically, with impeccable intonation, incisive rhythm and tasteful playing.

His musical tastes were conservative and refined. He liked virtuoso works by Henri Vieuxtemps, such as his three violin concertos, and Heinrich Wilhelm Ernst, and used those works in his teaching. Once a student objected to playing Ernst's Othello Fantasy, saying it was bad music. Auer did not back down. "You'll play it until it sounds like good music," he thundered at the student, "and you'll play nothing else."

=== Bach's works ===
==== Concertos ====
Auer never assigned either of Bach's solo violin concertos to a student. The Double Concerto, however, was one of his favorites. Auer calls the Double Concerto "the most important" of the three concertos.

==== Unaccompanied violin or violin and piano sonatas ====
Auer wrote that Ferdinand David "earned the undying gratitude of the violinistic world by [re]discovering the 'solo sonatas for violin', BWV 1001-1006, and the "Six sonatas for violin and piano". "David edited and published these works, and Joseph Joachim was the first to introduce them to the musical world at large", making "these compositions ... a fundamental pillar of violin literature." Auer puts special emphasis on the Chaconne from Bach's fourth sonata for unaccompanied violin (depending on editions, later known as Partita No. 2 in D minor, BWV 1004) together with 33 variations.

=== Mozart's concertos ===
Mozart wrote 5 concertos for violin and orchestra, all in 1775, and a well-appreciated double concerto, the Sinfonia Concertante, K. 364. Auer (2012) does not mention it, but mentions two of the single-violin concertos, one in D major, No. 4, and one in A major, No. 5. For another, in E-flat major, it turned out that Mozart did not actually write it.

== Conducting ==
Auer was also active as a conductor. He was in charge of the Russian Musical Society orchestral concerts intermittently in the 1880s and 90s. He was always willing to mount the podium to accompany a famous foreign soloist—as he did when Joachim visited Russia—and did the same for his students concertizing abroad.

== Teaching ==
Auer is remembered as one of the most important pedagogues of the violin, and was one of the most sought-after teachers for gifted students. "Auer's position in the history of violin playing is based on his teaching." Many notable virtuoso violinists were among his students, including Mischa Elman, Konstanty Gorski, Jascha Heifetz, Nathan Milstein, Toscha Seidel, Efrem Zimbalist, Georges Boulanger, Lyubov Streicher, Benno Rabinof, Kathleen Parlow, Julia Klumpke, Thelma Given, Sylvia Lent, Kemp Stillings, Oscar Shumsky, Mischa Mischakoff and Margarita Mandelstamm. Among these were "some of the greatest violinists" of the twentieth century.

Babel (1931) describes how in Odessa (now in Ukraine) very promising young violin students such as Elman, Milstein, and Zimbalist were enrolled in the violin class of Pyotr Stolyarsky, and if successful, sent on to Auer in St. Petersburg.

Auer also taught the young Clara Rockmore, who later became one of the world's foremost exponents of the theremin. See: List of music students by teacher: A to B#Leopold Auer. Most of Auer's students, like Yuliy Eidlin, who became his assistant and stayed on as an esteemed professor, studied with him at the St. Petersburg Conservatory (even Kathleen Parlow, coming all the way from western Canada), but Georges Boulanger, from Romania, studied with him in Dresden, Germany. Benno Rabinof and Oscar Shumsky, born in the United States, studied with Auer there.

Like pianist Franz Liszt, in his teaching, Auer did not focus on technical matters with his students. Instead, he guided their interpretations and concepts of music. If a student ran into a technical problem, Auer did not offer any suggestions. Neither was he inclined to pick up a bow to demonstrate a passage. Nevertheless, he was a stickler for technical accuracy. Fearing to ask Auer themselves, many students turned to each other for help. (Paradoxically, in the years before 1900 when Auer focused more closely on technical details, he did not turn out any significant students.)

While Auer valued talent, he considered it no excuse for lack of discipline, sloppiness or absenteeism. He demanded punctual attendance. He expected intelligent work habits and attention to detail. Lessons were as grueling, and required as much preparation, as recital performances.

In lieu of weekly lessons, students were required to bring a complete movement of a major work. This usually demanded more than a week to prepare. Once a student felt ready to play this work, he or she had to sign up 10 days prior to the class meeting. The student was expected to have the concert ready and to be dressed accordingly. An accompanist was provided. An audience watched—comprised not only of students and parents, but also often of distinguished guests and prominent musicians. Auer arrived for the lesson punctually; everything was supposed to be in place by the time he arrived. During the lesson, Auer would walk around the room, observing, correcting, exhorting, scolding, shaping the interpretation. "We did not dare cross the threshold of the classroom with a half-ready performance," one student remembered.

Admission to Auer's class was a privilege won by talent. Remaining there was a test of endurance and hard work. Auer could be stern, severe, harsh. One unfortunate student was ejected regularly, with the music thrown after him. Auer valued musical vitality and enthusiasm. He hated lifeless, anemic playing and was not above poking a bow into a student's ribs, demanding more "krov." (The word literally means "blood" but can also be used to mean fire or vivacity.)

While Auer pushed his students to their limits, he also remained devoted to them. He remained solicitous of their material needs. He helped them obtain scholarships, patrons and better instruments. He used his influence in high government offices to obtain residence permits for his Jewish students.

=== Jascha Heifetz and his father in the Conservatory ===
There was a somewhat limited area of Russia called the Jewish Pale of Settlement in which Jews were allowed to live. The area consisted approximately of Ukraine, Poland, and Belarus. Around 1900, St. Petersburg had a substantial Jewish community, the largest in Russia outside the Pale. Auer (1923, pp. 156–157) wrote that Jascha, as a boy ten or eleven years old,

was admitted to the Conservatoire without question in view of his talent; but what was to be done with his family? Someone hit upon the happy idea of suggesting that I admit Jascha's father, a violinist of forty, into my own class ... This I did, and as a result the law was obeyed while at the same time the Heifetz family was not separated, for it was not legally permissible for the wife and children of a Conservatoire pupil to be separated from their husband and father. However, since the students were without exception expected to attend the obligatory classes in solfeggio, piano, and harmony, and since Papa Heifetz most certainly did not attend any of them ... I had to do battle continually with the management on his account. It was not until the advent of Glazunov, my last director, that I had no further trouble in seeing that the boy remained in his parents' care until the summer of 1917, when the family was able to go to America."

Auer shaped his students' personalities. He gave them style, taste, musical breeding. He also broadened their horizons. He made them read books, guided their behavior and career choices and polished their social graces. He also insisted that his students learn a foreign language if an international career was expected.

Even after a student started a career, Auer would watch with a paternal eye. He wrote countless letters of recommendation to conductors and concert agents. When Mischa Elman was preparing for his London debut, Auer traveled there to coach him. He also continued work with Efrem Zimbalist and Kathleen Parlow after their debuts.

== Dedications ==
A number of composers dedicated pieces to Auer. One such case was Tchaikovsky's Violin Concerto, which, however, he initially chose not to play. This was not because he regarded the work as "unplayable", as some sources say, but because he felt that "some of the passages were not suited to the character of the instrument, and that, however perfectly rendered, they would not sound as well as the composer had imagined". He did play the work later in his career, with alterations in certain passages that he felt were necessary. Performances of the Tchaikovsky concerto by Auer's students (with the exception of Nathan Milstein's) were also based on Auer's edition. Another work Tchaikovsky had dedicated to Auer was the Sérénade mélancolique of 1875. After their conflict over the Violin Concerto, Tchaikovsky also withdrew the Sérénade's dedication to Auer. British composer Eva Ruth Spalding dedicated one of her string quartets to Auer, who had been her teacher at the St. Petersburg Conservatory.

== Compositions and writings ==
Auer wrote a small number of works for his instrument, including the Rhapsodie hongroise for violin and piano. He also wrote a number of cadenzas for other composers' violin concertos including those by Beethoven, Brahms, and Mozart's third. He wrote three books: Violin Playing as I Teach It (1920), My Long Life in Music (1923) and Violin Master Works and Their Interpretation (1925). He also wrote an arrangement for Paganini's 24th Caprice (with Schumann's piano accompaniment) later performed by Jascha Heifetz, Henryk Szeryng and Ivry Gitlis, in which the final variation is removed and his own composed. There are also alterations to various passages throughout the piece. Auer edited much of the standard repertoire, concertos, short pieces and all of Bach's solo works. His editions are published mostly by Carl Fischer. He also transcribed a great many works for the violin including some of Chopin's piano preludes.

=== Evaluation and selection of concertos and (Beethoven) romances ===
In Violin Master Works...., Auer 2012, Auer gives some rankings. Chapter X is on "Three Master Concertos," namely Beethoven's, Brahms', and Mendelssohn's. To these three, Joachim adds a fourth, by Max Bruch. Auer's Chapter XI on "The Bruch Concertos" mentions two. Bruch's First, in G minor, Op. 26, Auer says is probably the next-most played after the three "master" concertos. Steinberg (1998) does not mention Bruch concertos after the first, although both he and Auer mention the Scottish Fantasy for violin and orchestra. See above about Bach's and Mozart's violin concertos. Beethoven wrote two Romances for violin and orchestra, Romance No. 1 in G, Op. 40, and Romance No. 2 in F, Op. 50. Auer (pp. 52–54) mentions the two Romances as scored for violin and piano in versions he had edited, but the text is about the orchestral version.

== Relatives ==
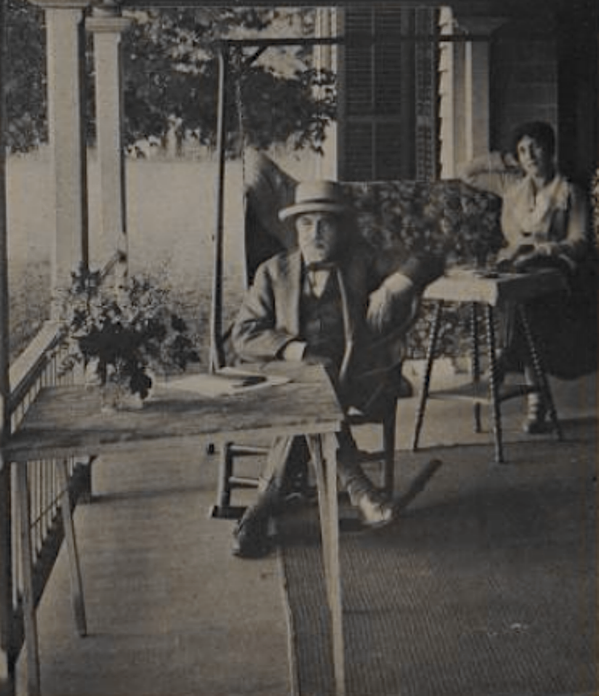
Professor Auer and Mme. Stein at Lake George

Auer's first wife, Nadine Pelikan, was Russian. The jazz vibraphonist Vera Auer is a niece of Leopold Auer. The actor Mischa Auer (born Mischa Ounskowsky) was his grandson. The composer György Ligeti (the name Ligeti is a Hungarian equivalent of the German name Auer) was his great-grandnephew. Prominent Hungarian philosopher and lecturer Ágnes Heller mentions that prominent Hungarian violinist Leopold Auer was related to her family on her mother's side.

Auer's second wife, Wanda Bogutska Stein (Auer), was his piano accompanist on some concert tours (in Russia up to 1917) and later on some recordings.

== Discography ==
- Hungarian Dance No. 1 in G minor, by Brahms, 1920
- Mélodie in E-flat major, Op. 42, No. 3 (from Souvenir d'un lieu cher), by Tchaikovsky, 1920

These were both taken from a live recording in Carnegie Hall where Auer gave a sold out performance toward the end of his life.

== Sources ==
- Auer, Leopold, Violin Playing As I Teach It, Dover, New York, 1980, ISBN 0-486-23917-9; earlier edition, Stokes, New York, 1921
- Auer, Leopold (1923), My Long Life in Music, F. A. Stokes, New York
- Auer, Leopold (1925), Violin Master Works and their Interpretation, Carl Fischer, New York, repr. Dover, 2012, ISBN 0-486-49911-1
- Babel, Isaac (1931), "Awakening," in Maxim D. Shrayer, ed., An Anthology of Jewish-Russian Literature: Two Centuries of Dual Identity, 1801-1953, pub. M. E. Sharpe, 2007, transl. from Russian by Larissa Szporluk, a Google book, pp. 313–315.
- Klier, John D. (1995), Imperial Russia's Jewish Question, 1855–1881, Cambridge University Press, a Google Book
- Nathans, Benjamin, 2004, Beyond the Pale: The Jewish Encounter with Late Imperial Russia, University of California Press, a Google Book.
- Potter, Tully, sleeve note to Great Violinists: Jascha Heifetz, naxos recording 8.111288, of the three Bach violin concertos and Mozart's no. 5.
- Roth, Henry (1997). Violin Virtuosos: From Paganini to the 21st Century. Los Angeles, CA: California Classics Books. ISBN 1-879395-15-0
- Schwarz, Boris, Great Masters of the Violin (New York: Simon and Schuster, 1983)
- Steinberg, Michael (1998), The Concerto, Oxford University Press
- The Violinist, Vols. 22-23, a Google Book, article "American Debut of Leopold Auer", p. 190.
