= Russian Musical Society =

1859–1917 music school in Russia

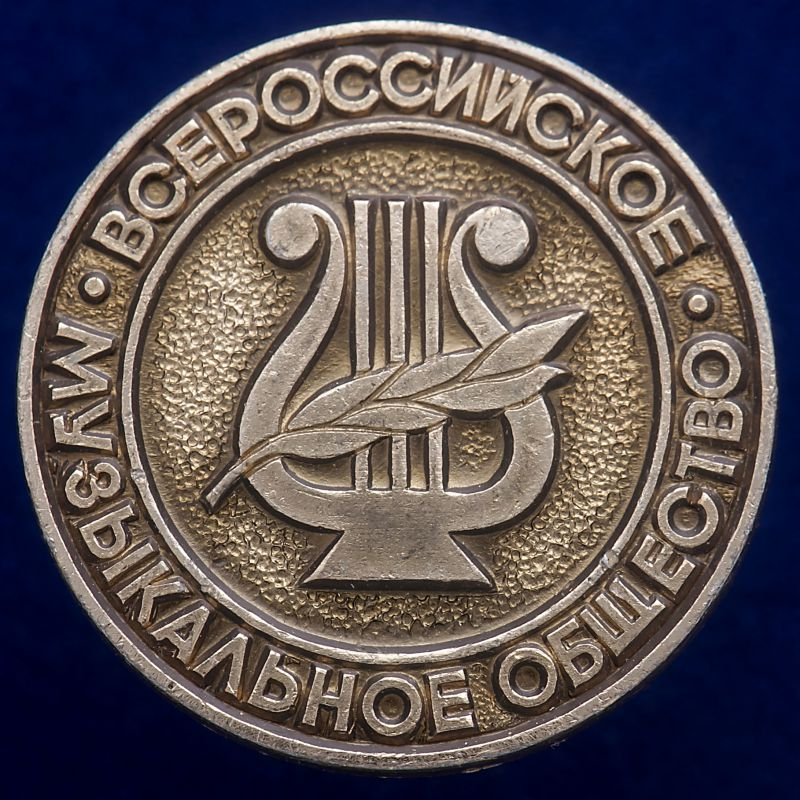
All-Russian Music Society emblem

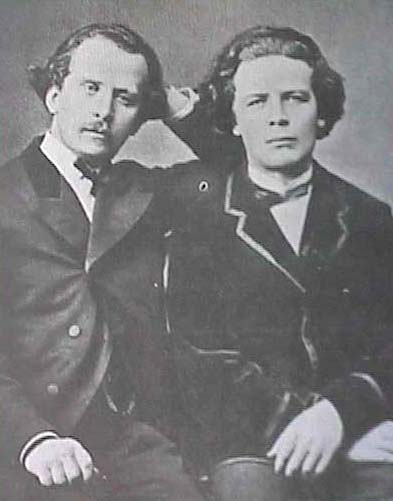
Nikolai (left) and Anton Rubinstein.

The Russian Musical Society (RMS) (Russian: Русское музыкальное общество) was the first music school in Russia open to the general public. It was launched in 1859 by the Grand Duchess Elena Pavlovna and Anton Rubinstein, one of the few notable Russian pianists and composers of the day. Disbanded in the Russian Revolution, it has since been revived.

== Origins ==
The Russian Musical Society (RMS) was an organization founded in 1859 by the Grand Duchess Elena Pavlovna (a German-born aunt of Tsar Alexander II) and her protégé, pianist and composer Anton Rubinstein, with the intent of raising the standard of music in the country and disseminating musical education.

Rubinstein and the Grand Duchess's travels together in Europe a decade earlier had prompted them to set up a permanent society to encourage both the study and performance of music in Russia. The Grand Duchess was the provider and driving force for the RMS, successfully obtaining her nephew's Imperial approval. Rubinstein provided the musical leadership. His presence lent the RMS a further appearance of prestige, given both his international career as a pianist and his reputation as a composer of distinction—qualities uncommon at that time for any native-born musician in Russia.

== Development and influence ==
The RMS's inaugural concert was given in November 1859, with Rubinstein playing one of his piano concertos. By the mid-1860s, concerts given by the RMS had introduced the general public to all the symphonies, piano concertos and overtures of Ludwig van Beethoven. Audiences had also heard oratorios by George Frideric Handel, cantatas by Johann Sebastian Bach, operas by Christoph Willibald Gluck, as well as works by Robert Schumann and Franz Schubert. Russian music had also been performed. Operas by Russian composers which were presented included those of Mikhail Glinka, Alexander Dargomyzhsky and Anton Rubinstein, among others.

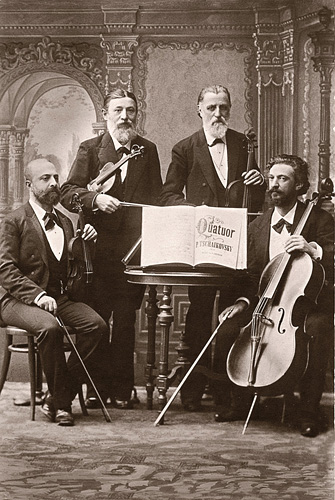
The String Quartet of the Russian Musical Society of Saint Petersburg in the 1880s; (left to right) Leopold Auer, Johann Wilhelm Zacharias Pickel, Hieronymus Weickmann, Aleksandr Verzhbilovich

Most important, however, were the music classes offered by the RMS, open to all students, which eventually gave rise to professorial education. These classes were held at the Grand Duchess's home, the Mikhailovsky Palace.

Until the inception of the RMS, there had been no music school in Russia to provide a basic professional training in music. Music instruction had been limited to the homes of the aristocracy and private schools. Consequently, native Russian musicians and performers were rare. Classical concerts were performed generally by foreign musicians, primarily from Germany.

In addition to the classes of the RMS, the Free Music School, which emphasised choral singing, was also formed. Both the classes and the school quickly became popular. As surprising as the number of students who enrolled was their extreme diversity. Bureaucrats, merchants, tradesmen and university students attended, as well as many young women who lacked the means to study privately.

In 1860, helped and encouraged by his brother Anton, Nikolai Rubinstein and Prince Nikolai Petrovitch Troubetzkoy founded a Moscow branch of the RMS in Rubinstein's own house. This branch proved so successful that they eventually relocated it into larger quarters and expanded their work there. Troubetzkoy was the chairman of RMS for seventeen years.

The RMS's formal successors were the St. Petersburg Conservatory, which opened (also under the auspices of Anton Rubinstein), in September 1862, and the Moscow Conservatory, founded by Nikolai Rubinstein and Prince Nikolai Petrovitch Troubetzkoy in September 1866.

== Disbandment and revival ==
Following the Russian Revolution of 1917, the RMS was disbanded in the same year.

The All-Russian Musical Society, which was established in 1987 is meant to be the legal successor of the Russian Musical Society traditions and cultural legacy. On February 18 of 2010 upon the decision of the All-Russian Music Society Fifth convention the society was renamed back to the original title of the Russian Music Society, which marked the official reincarnation of the original organization. The modern RMS is the public agency with functions of the creative union. It consolidates thousands of people that represent musical and choreographic culture of Russia and its nations on both professional and amateur levels. The Society has chapters in all Russian regions, which allows it to effectively influence the condition and development of the modern musical and choreographic art in the country, as well to track and analyze cultural trends.

Among major forms of the RMS involvement and its regional branches are organization of concerts, folklore holidays, master classes, music festivals and competitions. The RMS also assists Russian soloists and music groups in participation at the International festivals, competitions and concert tours.

== Sources ==
- Brown, David, Tchaikovsky: The Early Years, 1840-1874 (New York: W.W. Norton & Company, Inc., 1978)
- Poznansky, Alexander, Tchaikovsky: The Quest for the Inner Man (New York: Schirmer Books, 1991)
- Struttle, Wilson, Tchaikovsky, His Music and Times (Speldhurst, Kent, United Kingdom: Midas Books, 1979)
- Warrack, John, Tchaikovsky (New York: Charles Scribner's Sons, 1973)
