= Anaida Sumbatyan =

Armenian pianist

Anaida Stepanovna Sumbatyan (Russian: Анаи́да Степа́новна Сумбатя́н; 1905–1985) was an Armenian pianist.

She taught at the Central Moscow Conservatory. She became the first teacher who had two separate students win the International Tchaikovsky Competition: Vladimir Ashkenazy and Vladimir Krainev. Among her pupils were Vladimir Ashkenazy, Vladimir Krainev, Nelly Akopian-Tamarina, Sergey Musaelyan, Oxana Yablonskaya, Konstantin Orbelyan, Igor Bezrodny, Dmitry Feofanov, Maxim Mogilevsky, Philip Koltsov, Elana Varvarova and others. Sumbatyan was friends with Sviatoslav Richter, Nina Dorliak, Heinrich Neuhaus, and Daniil Shafran.
