= Alexei Soutchkov =

Russian pianist (born 1966)

Alexei Soutchkov (also Alexey Suchkov; Russian: Алексе́й Никола́евич Сучко́в; born April 3, 1966 in Moscow) is a Russian pianist, the winner of 80 prizes (43 first prizes) national, european and international piano competitions in the Soviet Union, Germany, France, Italy and in the United States of America.

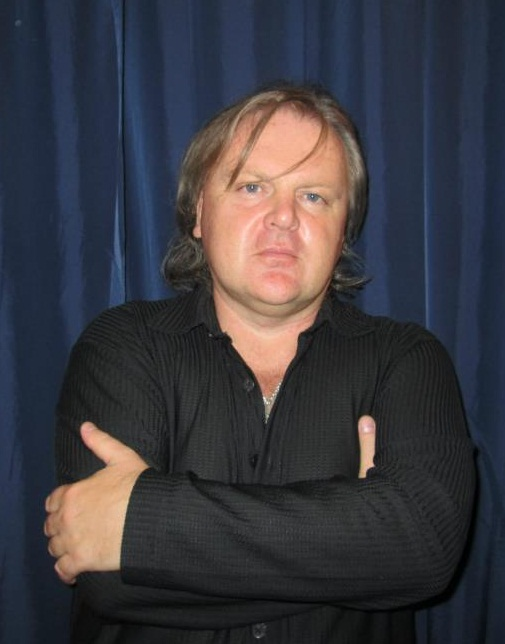
Alexei Soutchkov

== Biography ==
Born in a family of piano teachers, Soutchkov began his studies in the Central Music School of Moscow, after he has continued to study in the Moscow Conservatory "Tchaikovsky" with Professor Yevgeny Malinin (assistant to Maestro Heinrich Neuhaus), obtaining his Diploma and specialization in piano in 1991 and completing the doctorate of study in 1993.

He is the winner of First Prizes in national and international piano competitions: Cup Pianists of Italy in Osimo, Palma d'Oro in Finale Ligure, Seiler Prize in Palermo, Carlo Mosso Prize in Alessandria, International Piano Competition in Rome, Riviera Etrusca prize in Piombino, Onde Musicali prize in Taranto, Mario Polovineo Tribute in Teramo, Prize Citta di Brindisi, Prize Citta di Cesenatico, Pietro Argento Prize in Gioia del Colle.

He has given concerts as a soloist in the Soviet Union, Italy, Germany, France, Poland and in the United States of America. He is currently President of the Italian Artistic Association "Suchkov & Suchkov", founded in Sassuolo in 2011 together with his son Ivan, who is also a pianist and artistic director of the association.

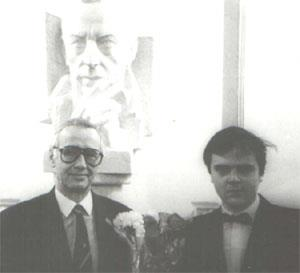
Alexei Soutchkov with Maestro Yevgeny Malinin. Moscow, Rachmaninov Hall
