= Wissam Boustany =

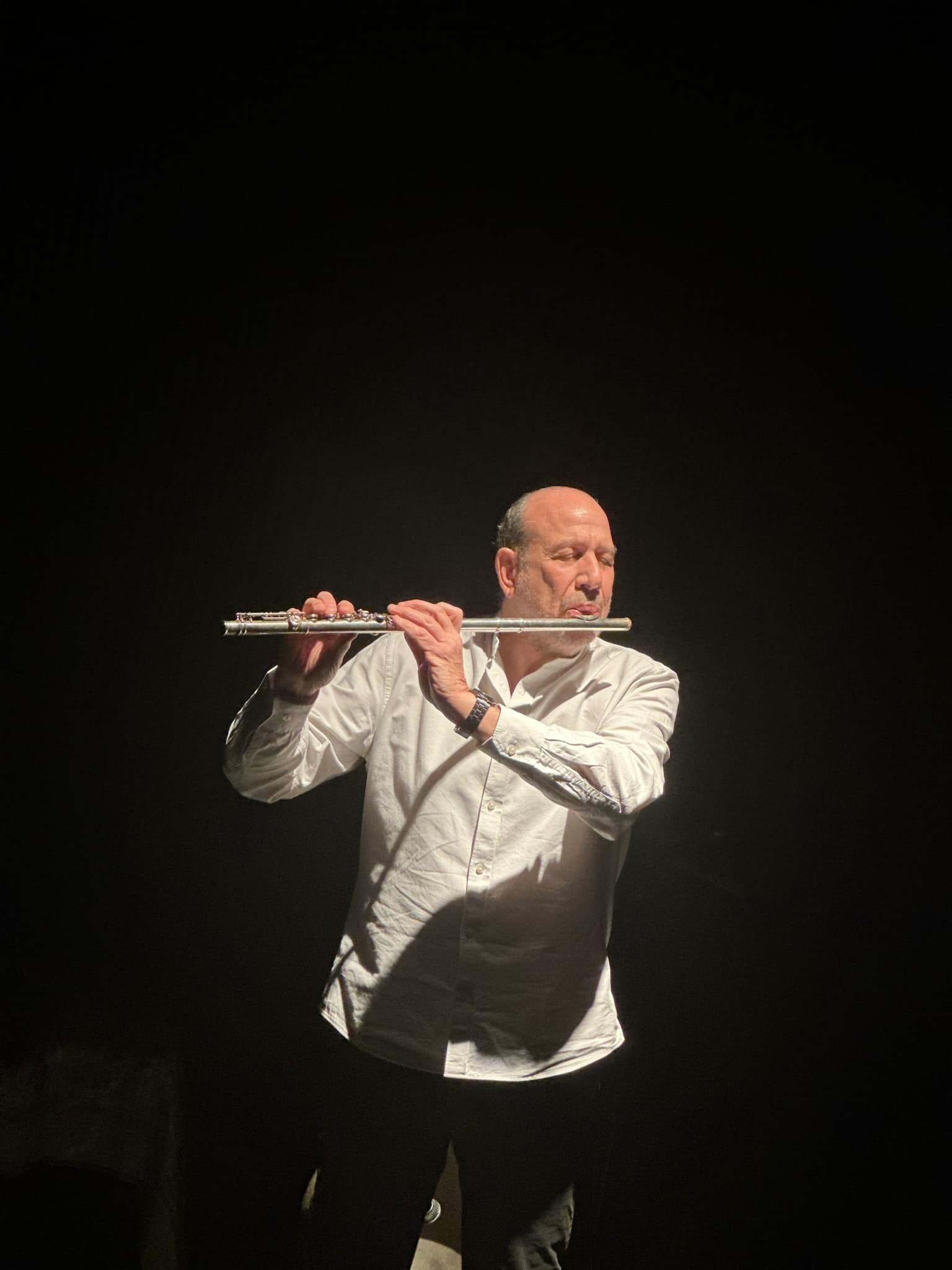

Background information
- Born: Wissam Boustany; October 1, 1960 (age 66); Lebanon
- Genre: Classical
- Occupations: Solo Concert Flutist, Composer
- Instrument: Flute
- Years active: 1982 –present
- Labels: Nimbus Alliance, Chandos, Deutsche Grammophon
- Website: www.towardshumanity.org

Wissam Boustany (born 1 October 1960) is a Lebanese/British concert flautist. Boustany has toured and collaborated with a number of symphony and chamber orchestras. Conductors Boustany has worked with include Claudio Abbado, Ivan Fischer, Bramwell Tovey, John Eliot Gardiner, Roger Norrington, Georg Solti, Peter Szilvay, Lubnan Baalbaki, James Judd, Jordi Mora, Volodymyr Sirenko, Levon Parikian, Nicholas Cleobury, Martyn Brabbins, Michel Brandt, Varujan Kodjan, Clark Rundell, Jerzy Maksymiuk, Evelyne Aiello, Ludwig Carrasco, Nader Abbassi, Andrew Morley and Toby Purser. He is a recipient of The Crystal Award, awarded to him in 1998 at the World Economic Forum, Davos, Switzerland.

== Background ==
Boustany was born in Beirut, Lebanon, the son of a pipeline engineer, Fayez Boustany. His mother, Nadia Saba, is of Palestinian descent. Raised in Lebanon, Wissam studied flute with Dr Hussam Yacoub (Iraqi flute player) and his step-father Emile Nouné (Lebanese violinist). In 1977, at the age of 17, Boustany left Lebanon and the civil war behind to study with Trevor Wye at Chetham's School of Music and the Royal Northern College of Music (RNCM) in Manchester, England, graduating from the RNCM in 1982.

== Early career ==
Upon graduating Wissam moved to London, where he started his freelance career. He was Principal Flute of the Chamber Orchestra of Europe under the conductor Claudio Abbado at the age of 23 and was also associated with several orchestras including the London Symphony Orchestra, London Mozart Players, London Chamber Soloists Chamber Orchestra. During the mid-1980s, Boustany presented his London debut concerts at the Wigmore Hall, Queen Elizabeth Hall, Purcell Room and Barbican Centre. In 1986 he stood down from all orchestral playing in order to pursue a solo and teaching career.

== Instruments ==
Boustany plays on a Brannen Kingma-System Flute, a revolutionary key system that facilitates the playing of quartertones, multiphonics and allows for subtle venting/shading to improve intonation and tone quality. Boustany has recently switched to a wood headjoint made by Tobias Mancke.

== Professional works ==
Boustany has performed in the Wigmore Hall, Royal Festival Hall, Queen Elizabeth Hall, Purcell Room, Barbican, St John’s Smith Square, St James Piccadilly, Lincoln Center, Musikverein, Concertgebouw, Gran Teatre del Liceu, Kilden Performing Arts Centre, Beiteddine Festival, Al-Bustan Festival and others. As a soloist he has collaborated with the BBC Scottish Symphony Orchestra, BBC Philhamonic, London Soloists Chamber Orchestra, State Symphony Orchestra of Ukraine, Utrecht Chamber Orchestra, St Paul's Sinfonia, Polish Chamber Orchestra, Qatar Philharmonic Orchestra, Cairo Opera Orchestra, Orquestra 5 de mayo and Chamber Orchestra of Europe and the Lebanese Philharmonic Orchestra.

Boustany has collaborated with several composers on commissions and première performances; composers include: Bushra El-Turk, Houtaf Khoury, Yevhen Stankovych, David Sutton-Anderson, Alun Hoddinott, Tarek Younis, Paul Reade, Peter Cowdrey, Carl Witt, Pierre Thilloy, Paul Renan, Dai Fujikura, Michael Oliva, Beat Furrer, Simon Holt, Boghos Gelalian, Waleed Howrani, Marcel Khalife, and Shaun Bracey.

Boustany has developed a duo partnership with pianist Aleksander Szram, which has developed a unique reputation because they both perform from memory on stage and when recording.

Boustany has recorded music on labels including Nimbus Alliance, Deutsche Grammophon, and Chandos.

== Discography ==
- GIOACCHINO ROSSINI - IL VIAGGIO A REIMS (Deutsche Grammophon, released 1985) with the Chamber Orchestra of Europe conducted by Claudio Abbado; this Opera featured Wissam Boustany on stage with the baritone Samuel Ramey.
- "HOMMAGE AT TARKOVSKY" (Deutsche Grammophon, released 1998)
- SOUNDS FROM WITHIN (Nimbus Alliance, re-released 2011)
- WANDERING WINDS (Nimbus Alliance, re-released 2011)
- VIVALDI’S CHILDREN (Nimbus Alliance, re-released 2011)
- MIRROR OF ETERNITY (Nimbus Alliance, re-released 2011) with the National Symphony Orchestra of Ukraine conducted by Volodymyr Sirenko
- THIS INVISIBLE WORLD (double-CD, Nimbus Alliance, released 2011)
- GREGSON (Chandos, released 2014) with the BBC Philharmonic conducted by Bramwell Tovey

== Teaching ==
Boustany was Professor of Flute at Trinity Laban, London (1999-2009), where he was made an Honorary Member in 2011. He also taught at the Royal Northern College of Music (2010-2015).

He gives masterclasses worldwide, having launched his In Search of Inspiration summer courses in Minnesota, Brussels, Penzance, France and Greece. He has also been giving yearly summer masterclasses at the Scottish International Flute Summer School in St Andrews, Scotland, and the Grolloo Sessions with colleague flautists Matthias Ziegler and Ian Clarke, which take place in Grolloo, The Netherlands.

Boustany has served on judging panels of examinations and auditions. He has served on the juries of competitions in countries including the NFA Competition (USA), the BFS Competition (London, UK), Flute Meeting, (Larissa, Greece), and Abertawe Music Festival (Wales, UK).

== Awards and competitions ==
- 1998: The Crystal Award, Presented at the World Economic Forum - Davos, Switzerland
- 1997: National Order of the Cedar, Knighthood (Chevalier de l’order du Cèdre), awarded by the Lebanese Government
- 1982: Madeira International Flute Competition - silver medallist
- 1981: London Symphony Orchestra/Shell Competition - silver medallist
- 1978: BBC Young Musician of the Year - 2nd Prize, woodwind section
