= Valentina Kameníková =

Czech pianist and Ukrainian music teacher

- Born: 20 December 1930; Odesa, Soviet Union
- Died: 29 November 1989 (aged 58)
- Occupations: pianist, music teacher

Valentina Kameníková (née Valentine Mikhaylovna Wax; 20 December 1930 – 29 November 1989) was a Czech pianist and Ukrainian music teacher, respectively. She came from a musical family. During World War II in 1941, due to her Jewish origin she was evacuated to Siberia, studying and playing the piano, first in Odesa at a local music school, then at the Odesa Conservatory, and later at the Moscow Conservatory under Prof. Heinrich Neuhaus.

In 1954 she married, and in 1957 moved with her family to Czechoslovakia. From 1959 to 1961, she undertook postgraduate studies in piano at the Prague Academy of Performing Arts under Prof. František Rauch. Starting in 1963 she taught at the Prague Conservatory, and in 1970, was worked as a lecturer at the Prague Academy of Performing Arts. In 1976, she was a jury member for the Paloma O'Shea Santander International Piano Competition. She was a notable classical interpreter of Russian music with superb piano technique, and was highly acclaimed by critics. She eventually left a legacy of about fifty recordings.
