= Pavel Berman =

- Birth name: Pavel Berman
- Born: January 13, 1970 (age 55); Moscow, Soviet Union
- Genres: classical music
- Instrument: violin
- Years active: 1990 – present
- Labels: Koch International, Audiofon, Discover, Phoenix Classics, Dynamic

Pavel Berman (born January 13, 1970, Moscow) is a violinist and conductor of Russian origin, laureate of international competitions.

== Biography ==
Pavel Berman was born in Moscow. Father — renowned Russian pianist Lazar Berman, mother — pianist Valentina Berman (Sedova). He studied at the Tchaikovsky Conservatory with Igor Bezrodnyi. In 1992 he moved on to study with Isaac Stern and Dorothy DeLay at the Juilliard School in New York.

Pavel Berman attracted the international attention when he won the First Prize and gold medal at the International Violin Competition of Indianapolis in 1990.

Berman has appeared as a soloist and/or conductor with such orchestras as Italian Virtuosi, Moscow Virtuosi, Mantua Chamber Orchestra, Haydn Orchestra of Bolzano and Trento, Teatro Farnese Orchestra, Teatro Filarmonico Orchestra, Teatro Carlo Felice Orchestra, RAI National Symphony Orchestra, Philharmonic Orchestra of Fenice, Santa Cecilia Orchestra, Moscow Symphony Orchestra, Prague Philharmonic Orchestra, Prague Symphony Orchestra, National Radio Orchestra of Romania, Gulbenkian Orchestra, Royal Liverpool Philharmonic, Teatro Nacional de São Carlos Orchestra, Württemberg Chamber Orchestra Heilbronn, Staatskapelle Dresden, Berliner Symphoniker, Lithuanian National Symphony Orchestra, Indianapolis Symphony Orchestra, Atlanta Symphony Orchestra, Dallas Symphony Orchestra, China Philharmonic Orchestra, etc.

Pavel Berman has reached audiences at the Carnegie Hall in New York, Théâtre des Champs Elysées and Salle Gaveau in Paris, Herkulessaal in Munich, Auditorio Nacional in Madrid, Bunka Kaikan in Tokyo, Teatro alla Scala in Milan, Palais des Beaux Arts in Brussels and others.

In 1998 Pavel Berman founded and became a musical director of the Kaunas Chamber Orchestra in Lithuania, which eventually grew into Kaunas Symphony Orchestra.

Berman has recorded for Koch International, Audiofon, Discover, Phoenix Classics and Dynamic.

== Teaching ==
Pavel Berman teaches at the Conservatory of Southern Switzerland and the Academy Lorenzo Perosi in Biella, Italy. Berman is also a Master Teacher for iClassical Academy. With iClassical, Berman has recorded a series of online videos with the name "Paganini Unlocked" with all 24 Caprices in violin instruction and performance.
