= Oxana Yablonskaya =

Soviet, American, and Israeli pianist

- Оксана Яблонская
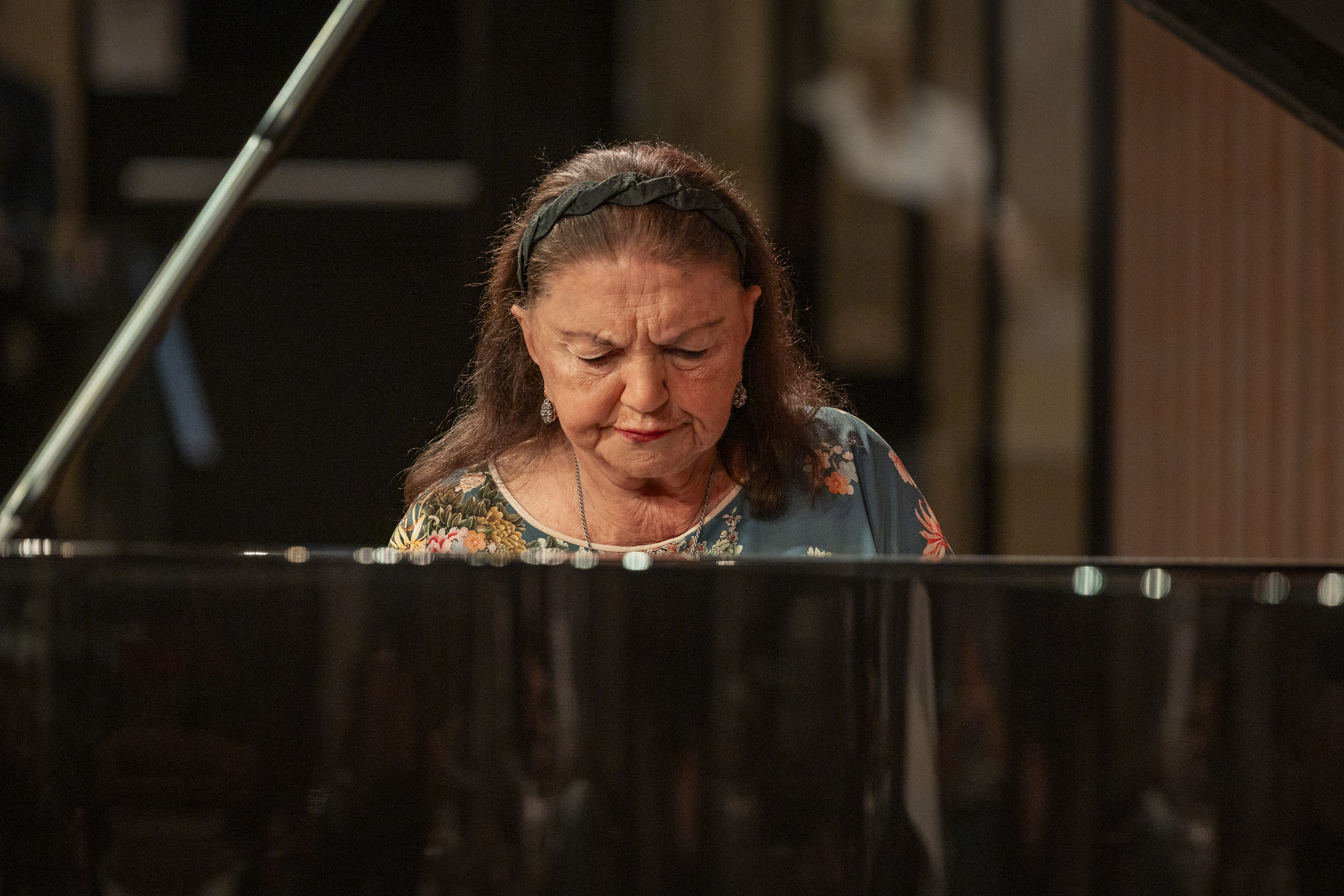
- Born: December 6, 1938; Moscow, Russia
- Musical career
- Occupation: Pianist
- Instrument: Piano

Oxana Yablonskaya (Russian: Оксана Михайловна Яблонская; born December 6, 1938) is a Soviet, American, and Israeli pianist who has had an active international performance career since the early 1960s. She began her career in the USSR and, although winning several important competitions in the West, was denied permission by the Soviet government to accept any performance engagements outside of the Soviet bloc. Frustrated by her career limitations, she emigrated to the United States in 1977. Described by The New York Times as an "internationally known virtuoso" and "one of the country's most distinguished musical residents", Yablonskaya has toured in concert and recital throughout the world and has made numerous recordings. She taught as a member of the piano faculty at the Juilliard School for more than 30 years, until 2009. She later emigrated to Israel, where she took up a position teaching at the Jerusalem Academy of Music and Dance.

== Life ==
Born in Moscow to a Jewish family, Yablonskaya was a pupil of pianist Anaida Sumbatyan at the Moscow Central School for the Gifted where she studied from the ages of six through sixteen. She then pursued further studies in her native city with Aleksandr Goldenweiser upon entering the Moscow Conservatory as well as Goldenweiser's Assistant Dmitry Bashkirov. She was a student of Tatiana Nikolayeva in her Doctorate program. After graduating from the conservatory in 1965, she joined the school's piano faculty. She went on to win top prizes in the Long-Thibaud-Crespin Competition in 1963, Rio de Janeiro Piano Competition in 1965 and the International Beethoven Piano Competition Vienna in 1969.

Yablonskaya was invited to perform with orchestras and in concert halls in the West during the 1960s and 1970s, but was never allowed to accept the engagements by the Soviet government. She also performed throughout the USSR and made numerous recordings on the Melodiya label. She was named a "Soloist of the Moscow Philharmonic" and was also highly active as a soloist with the Bolshoi Orchestra.

In 1975 Yablonskaya, along with her father and son, applied for a visa to emigrate to the United States, originally wanting to go to Israel, thus becoming a refusenik, a move which caused her to be fired from her post at the Moscow Conservatory and which blacklisted her from all concert venues in the USSR. She waited for over two years to obtain a visa which was approved largely due to a petition which had been organized by American composers, conductors, musicians, movie actors, writers and senators such as Elie Wiesel, Isaac Bashevis Singer, Leonard Bernstein, Stephen Sondheim, Katharine Hepburn, Shelley Winters, Norman Mailer, Henry Miller and many others. The family came to New York City (where her sister was already living) in 1977 and later that year Yablonskaya gave a critically acclaimed recital at Carnegie Hall. This launched her career in the west, and she went on to appear with many of the world's finest symphony orchestras. As recording artist, Yablonskaya recorded for labels such as Melodiya, Connoisseur Society, and Naxos,. Yablonskaya is the Winner of the Grand Prix du Disque from the Liszt Society in Budapest for her recording of Schubert transcriptions by Liszt. She is an Honorary Academician of the International Academy of the Arts at the United Nations, International Academy of the Arts in San Francisco and Independent Academy of Liberal Arts at the Russian Academy of Sciences. She is a Yamaha Artist.

Yablonskaya is Online Master Teacher at iClassical Academy with whom she has recorded several online Masterclasses.

Yablonskaya's son, Dmitry Yablonsky, is a noted cellist. They have given mother and son recitals to critical acclaim. The two have also been joined in concert by Oxana's clarinetist-husband Alexander Volchonok. In 2016 she emigrated to Israel with her son, after becoming a citizen of the country in 2014, where she took up a position teaching piano at the Jerusalem Academy of Music and Dance.
