= Stanislav Neuhaus =

Soviet-Russian classical pianist

Stanislav Genrikhovich Neuhaus
- Станислав Генрихович Нейгауз
- Born: 21 March 1927; Moscow, Soviet Union
- Died: 24 January 1980 (aged 52); Peredelkino, near Moscow
- Occupation: Pianist
- Father: Heinrich Neuhaus

Stanislav Genrikhovich Neuhaus (Russian: Станислав Генрихович Нейгауз; 21 March 1927 – 24 January 1980) was a Soviet-Russian classical pianist, and son of the pianist and pedagogue Heinrich Neuhaus.

Neuhaus was born in Moscow, during the time in which his father was a professor at the Moscow Conservatory. He studied piano with his father from 1953 to 1957 and, in his father's later years, was one of his three assistants, alongside Lev Naumov and Yevgeny Malinin. Brigitte Engerer was one of his students at the Moscow Conservatory, studying with him for five years, and his son, Stanislav Bunin, also went on to become a well known pianist. He died in Peredelkino, near Moscow, in 1980, aged 52.

The composer Aram Khachaturian, in the paper Soviet Musician, called Neuhaus the best pianist in the Moscow Conservatory, and The International Stanislav Neuhaus Piano Competition is named in his honor.
