= Jacques Leiser =

- Occupations: Artist manager, photographer
- Known for: Managing classical musicians and photographing famous artists

Jacques Leiser is an international artist manager and photographer who has represented and collaborated with many classical musicians.

== Biography ==
Very early in his life, Leiser became fascinated with photography, and for most of his career, he has never been far from his camera. Today his photo archives are a vast treasure trove of images of famous musicians and artists including Dmitri Shostakovich, Aram Khachaturian, Krysztof Penderecki, Heitor Villa-Lobos, Maria Callas, Sviatoslav Richter, Maurizio Pollini, Krystian Zimerman, Lazar Berman, Vladimir Ashkenazy, Artur Rubinstein, Julius Katchen, Alfred Cortot, Edwin Fischer, Annie Fischer, Clara Haskil, Heinrich Neuhaus, David Oistrakh, Mstislav Rostropovich, Otto Klemperer, Claudio Abbado, as well as Pablo Picasso, Serge Poliakoff, Tennessee Williams, Queen Elisabeth of Belgium and Premier Nikita Khrushchev.

Leiser first met and photographed Sviatoslav Richter while working with the Artists Department of EMI Records. At EMI Leiser had created the milestone series of the "Great Recordings of the Century". Determined to sign up Richter for EMI, Leiser sought out the Russian pianist during his first visit to the West (Helsinki in 1960). What followed this initial contact was a 37-year professional association and friendship one that included the creation of a remarkable photographic essay on one of the giants of the piano.

Early in 1998, some of Leiser's photographs of Sviatoslav Richter were featured at the Louvre Museum as part of its Film Festival of Great Pianists of the 20th Century. Subsequent exhibits were held at Lincoln Center, the San Diego Museum of Art, at Portland State University in 1999, at the Brooks Institute of Photography in Santa Barbara in 2001 and at USC in Los Angeles in 2002. A major exhibit, consisting of about 70 photographic portraits was displayed at the Music Conservatory in Zürich in October 2005. Future exhibits are planned in 2006 at prominent Swiss Music Festivals and at the Geneva Conservatory of Music.

Leiser is currently preparing a book of his recollections of music celebrities with whom he has been associated and will include numerous photographs.
