= Tamara Guseva =

Soviet musician (born 1926)

Tamara Nikolayevna Guseva (born 15 August 1926) was a Soviet classical pianist and People's Artist of Russia. She was born in Baku.

After graduating from the Moscow Conservatory under Heinrich Neuhaus, she took part at the IV Fryderyk Chopin competition, where she was awarded the 9th prize. That same year Guseva won, ex-aequo with Yevgeny Malinin, the International Youth and Students Festival in Budapest. She had previously been awarded a 4th prize at the 1945 All-Soviet Music Performance Competition.

Guseva served as Lev Oborin's assistant before being appointed teacher at the Moscow Conservatory (1959–66). During the 1950s she was a soloist at the newly founded Moscow Philharmonic Orchestra.
