= Stanislav Bunin =

Stanislav Bunin Станислав Бунин

Background information
- Born: 25 September 1966 (age 60); Moscow, Russian SFSR, Soviet Union
- Genre: Classical
- Occupation: Musician
- Instruments: Piano
- Labels: Deutsche Grammophon, EMI Classics

Stanislav Stanislavovich Bunin (Russian: Станислав Станиславович Бунин; born 25 September 1966) is a Russian-born concert pianist.

== Life ==
Bunin was born in Moscow in 1966 into an established European musical family which included his grandfather Heinrich Neuhaus, his grandmother Zinaida (Boris Pasternak's second wife), and his father, Stanislav Neuhaus.

In 1985, Bunin won first prize and the gold medal in the XI International Chopin Piano Competition in Warsaw. He spent much of the next decade in Japan, teaching for six years at Senzoku Gakuen Music College in the city of Kawasaki; his wife is Japanese. He obtained German citizenship in 2012.

Bunin recorded his interpretations of works by Haydn, Mozart and, most notably, Chopin. Those include works he played for the soundtrack to the 2007 video game Eternal Sonata.

In 2023, Bunin returned to stage after a 10-year absence because of his love for music and upon his wife's encouragement. His decade-long absence was due to various illnesses and ailments.
