= Konstantin Albrecht =

Russian composer

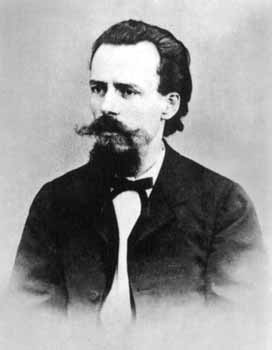
Konstantin Karlovich Albrecht

Konstantin Karlovich Albrecht (4 October 1836 – 26 June 1893) was a cellist in the Moscow Bolshoi Theater orchestra, a teacher and administrator. Interested in choral music, he founded the Moscow Choral Society in 1878. He also helped to found the Russian Musical Society and the Moscow Conservatory.

== Friendship with Tchaikovsky ==
Tchaikovsky and Albrecht met while both were working at the Moscow Conservatory. The two became friends, and Tchaikovsky dedicated his Serenade for Strings to Albrecht. Tchaikovsky also contributed to Albrecht's Collections of Choral Pieces for Single and Mixed Voices.

== See also ==
- with Tchaikovsky List of letters from Tchaikovsky to Albrecht at Tchaikovsky Research
