= Pavel Klinichev =

Russian conductor

- Павел Евгеньевич Клиничев
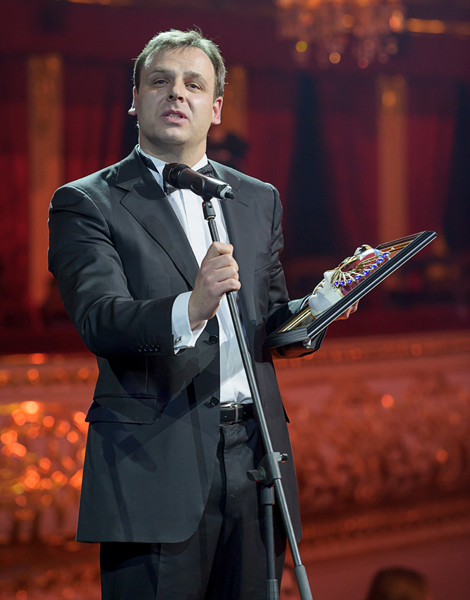
- Pavel Klinichev in 2014
- Born: 1974; Moscow
- Education: Moscow Conservatory
- Occupation: Conductor

Pavel Klinichev (Russian: Павел Евгеньевич Клиничев; born 1974) is a Russian conductor.

== Biography ==
Klinichev was born in Moscow and graduated from its Conservatory in 2000. In 2001 he became the Bolshoi Theatre conductor and by 2002 became its music director. The same year he conducted dramatic opera of Marice Jarre called Notre-Dame de Paris which used choreography by Roland Petit. In 2006 he was a conductor Dmitri Shostakovich's The Golden Age and next year conducted Le Corsaire following by Cesare Pugni's Esmeralda in 2009 and Johann Sebastian Bach's Passacaglia in 2010. Besides international operas he also conducted national ones such as both Yekaterinburg based The Tsar's Bride and Swan Lake and Romeo and Juliet in Rostov-on-Don. Other national operas that were conducted by him included both Ruggero Leoncavallo's Pagliacci and Eugene Onegin of Tchaikovsky in Astrakhan.

He also took part in conducting of Bolshoi Theatre opera, ballet and orchestra as well as Saint Petersburg Philharmonic Orchestra. Beside Russian orchestras he also was a conductor of French operas such as the Palais Garnier Metropolitan Opera, and Royal Opera House. Besides those, he conducted at the John F. Kennedy Center for the Performing Arts and Californian Orchestra of the West as well as both Chinese National Centre for the Performing Arts and Japanese Bunka Kaikan as well as Italian La Scala. As of now, he have recorded both CD and DVD of Bolshoi Chamber Orchestra and published it under Decca Recordslabel. Currently he is a teacher at the Moscow Conservatory and since 2010 works as a chief conductor of the Yekaterinburg Opera Theatre.
