= Evangeline Benedetti =

American cellist

- Occupations: Cellist, Author, Teacher of Cello and the Alexander Technique
- Employer(s): New York Philharmonic Orchestra, 1967-2011
- Notable work: Cello, Bow and You: Putting it All Together | Oxford University Press
- Website: www.evangelinebenedetti.com

Evangeline Benedetti (b. February 22, 1941) is an American cellist who was first woman cello player to play in the New York Philharmonic Orchestra.

== Education and training ==
Benedetti was born and raised in Austin, Texas. She was interested in playing in the band as a child and started playing on the French horn and the bassoon. She was also able to take free cello lessons at the University of Texas String Project, and her childhood teachers were Walter Coleman and Phyllis Young. After a year at University of Texas under the tutelage of Horace Britt, she received a full scholarship to study with Bernard Greenhouse at the Manhattan School of Music where she earned her Bachelor and Master of Music degrees. Benedetti also trained with Zara Nelsova and Pablo Casals.

== Career ==
In 1965, Benedetti gave her debut solo recital at the age of 24 in Carnegie Recital Hall. Her performance earned rave reviews, with the New York Times calling her approach to playing as “strikingly similar to Casals” and praising her "technical capacity," her "big, vibrant tone" and her "enormous communicativeness".

Benedetti's career with the New York Philharmonic began in 1967 after winning her audition during Leonard Bernstein's tenure as the orchestra's music director. Before the start of her audition, her cello fell and broke so she performed for her audition on a borrowed cello. She was the first cello player and the second woman to join the New York Philharmonic Orchestra, after Orin O'Brien a double bassist who joined the group in 1966. As one of the first female members in the New York Philharmonic, she became a subject of the 1969 Human Rights Commission's case investigating the orchestra's hiring practices for membership. In 1971, Benedetti and the other three women in the Philharmonic Orchestra talked with a New York Times reporter about conditions for women in the orchestra, including day-to-day activities and challenges. She retired in 2011.

Benedetti also teaches people to play string instruments. Her means of teaching, in particular her teaching of the Alexander Technique, has been analyzed by American String Teacher's Magazine. She is on the faculty of iClassical Academy and also presents cello classes on Medici.TV.

== Selected works ==
- Cello, Bow and You: Putting it All Together. Oxford, New York: Oxford University Press. 2016-10-20. ISBN 978-0-19-049739-2.
  - Reviewed by International Musician and Strad
- Sonata Op. 119 for Cello and Piano / Sonata Op. 40 for Cello and Piano by Evangeline Benedetti / Pedja Muzijevic
- Carnegie Hall 1971 recital included pieces by Chopin, Bach, Boccherini, and Ravel and was reviewed by the New York Times
