= Maurizio Baglini =

Italian pianist

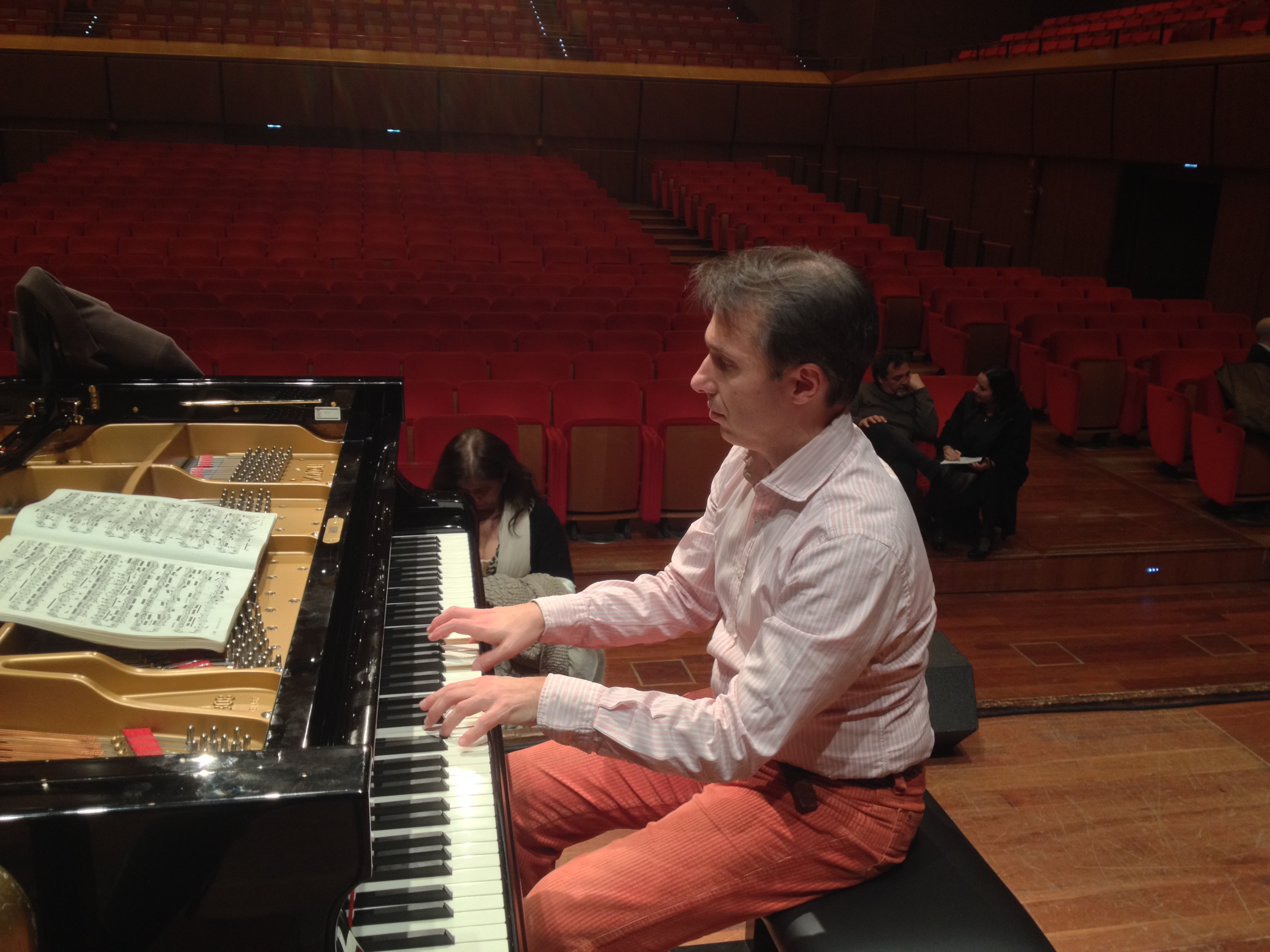
Maurizio Baglini playing the piano

Maurizio Baglini (born 1975 in Pisa), is an Italian pianist.

== Career ==
Prizewinner in major international piano competitions such as Concorso Busoni in Bolzano, Fryderyk Chopin Competition, he subsequently was awarded the 1998 William Kapell Competition's 3rd prize in Maryland, and 1999, aged only 24, he won the World Music Piano Master in Montecarlo. He is Online Master Teacher at iClassical Academy with whom he has recorded several online Masterclasses.

Baglini is internationally active as a concert pianist. He performs as a soloist in important Orchestral Seasons - Philharmonique de Montecarlo, Barcelona, Zürich, New Japan Philharmic, Orchestra Toscanini di Parma with E. Krivine, A. Jordan, H. Griffiths, D. Renzetti, B. Wright. In several famous worldwide Festivals, he performed as soloist like at La Roque-d'Anthéron, Lockenhaus, Yokohama Piano Festival, Israel Festival Jerusalem, Festival Berlioz à la Côte St. André, Nuits Romantiques à Aix les Bains, Australian Chamber Music Festival, Benedetti Michelangeli Festival Bergamo e Brescia, Festival Jaque Klein Rio de Janeiro, among concerts in several famous concerthalls all over the world. His performances have been reviewed by international press magazines like Le Monde, Le Figaro, Washington Post, American Record Guide.

Among his recordings, there's a period performance of Fryderyk Chopin's Etudes for Phoenix Classics. He has also recorded Ernest Chausson's Double Concerto for violin, piano and string quartet together with Pavel Berman, his teacher's Lazar Berman son, all Bach - Busoni piano works edited by Tudor, and Beethoven - Liszt Symphony n. 9 op. 125 published by Decca - Italy in 2009, following Liszt 2011 by Decca, and in Duo with Silvia Chiesa, Violoncello several other cds by Decca, since he has a permanent duo with the most famous Italian cellist Silvia Chiesa. In 2005, Baglini founded the Amiata Piano Festival, hosted since 2015 at the Fondazione Bertarelli Concert Hall in Cinigiano, where he is the artistic director. In 2011, he also became the artistic director of the Concerts at Palazzo Reale in Pisa, and the leader of the Chamber Music Festival in Montcaud, Provence.
