= Enrico Elisi =

Italian pianist

Enrico Elisi is an Italian pianist from Bologna, Italy. He has gained international recognition for his performances across four continents. He has been lauded for his "mastery of elegance, refinement, and fantasy" (La Nueva España) and "remarkable sensitivity, imagination, and polish" (Baltimore Sun). Elisi's career spans numerous prestigious venues and collaborations, establishing him as a distinguished pianist.

== Life and career ==
Throughout Europe, Elisi has performed at venues such as the Bemberg Museum in Toulouse, France; Centro del Carmen in Valencia, Spain; Dante Society in Bonn, Germany; Wolfsburg Castle and Kiel Universität's Bach-Saal in Germany; and the Cyril and Methodius Foundation in Piestany, Slovakia. In Italy, he has performed at historic locations, including La Fenice Theatre in Venice, Dante's Church and the Hall of the Five Hundred in the Medici-owned Palazzo Vecchio, and Sala del Buonumore in Florence. Other Italian performances occurred at the Pavarotti-Freni Opera House in Modena, the Bibiena Theatre and Palazzo Guerreri-Gonzaga in Mantua, and the Sala dei Giganti in Padua.

He has performed in Japan, South Korea (IBK Hall, Seoul), China, Taiwan, Indonesia, Singapore, Peru (Centro Cultural de España, Lima), and Canada (Banff Centre) as well as at notable venues in the United States, including the National Gallery of Art, the Italian Embassy in Washington, DC, the New York Public and Morgan Libraries, and Carnegie Hall’s Weill Hall. Recently, he received praise at the Great Pianists at Stetson, Kent Keyboard and Coastal Carolina Steinway Series, and the Chopin Society (San Francisco).

As a soloist, Elisi has collaborated with renowned orchestras, including the Florence Symphony in Italy, Orchestra Classica de Porto in Portugal, Jakarta Sinfonietta in Indonesia, and various symphony orchestras in the United States such as the Bay Atlantic Symphony, Greeley Philharmonic, Williamsport Symphony, Pennsylvania Centre, and Central Texas Philharmonic.

Elisi's contributions extend beyond his performances as he has recorded works by Mozart, with a forthcoming release featuring selected Partitas and Preludes by Bach. His performances have been featured in TV broadcasts such as Rádio e Televisão de Portugal and WPSU in the United States. Radio stations worldwide, including Montebeni Classica FM in Italy, WCLV Cleveland, UNC, KCNV Nevada Public Radio, KGCS, and Via Classica Radio in Germany, have also showcased his playing.

During her career as a chamber musician, Elisi has collaborated with ensembles such as the New Orford String Quartet as well as principal players from the Baltimore, Chicago, and American Symphony Orchestras.

He has championed new music by performing works by contemporary composers, including Fedele, Berio, and Sciarrino, and has premiered compositions by Kye Ryung Park and Paul Chihara. Elisi's diverse new music repertoire includes notable recordings of Chihara's "Two Images" on Albany Records and the highly anticipated release of J. V. Grossmann's "Angelus and Songs," a collection of works by the native Peruvian composer.

Elisi's reputation as a distinguished musician has led to invitations to music festivals worldwide, including "Art of the Piano" in Cincinnati, Texas State, Artciál, RPPF, and the Chautauqua Institution in the United States; VIPA Valencia in Spain; Todi Music Masters and Conero Festival in Italy; Borromeo in Switzerland; The Thinking Pianist in England; and the Ameri-China Foundation and Sichuan International Piano Festival in China.

Additionally, Elisi has served on the jury of numerous international piano competitions, including the Peabody Yale Gordon, Iowa, SMU Concerto, and Dallas International competitions in the United States; the Stepping Stone and RCM's Glenn Gould School Concerto competitions in Canada; and the Pacific Rim competition in Australia and New Zealand. He has also held positions as the chairperson for the Nuova Coppa Pianisti in Osimo and the Palma d'Oro in Italy.

Dr. Enrico Elisi has conducted interactive workshops for institutions such as the Pinerolo Accademia di Musica, Royal College of Music in London, and the Royal Northern College in Manchester. As a Yellowbarn Festival Artist-in-Residence, he performed an all-Bach recital and shared his insights on ornamentation and articulation in selected dances.

Elisi's teaching career spans various esteemed institutions. He holds the Harold D. and Imogene Herndon Endowed Professorship of Music in Piano at Texas Christian University. His teaching positions have included the University of Toronto, Eastman School of Music, Penn State University, and UNLV. He has also been a visiting professor at Hanyang University and Ewha Womans University in Korea. Elisi's affiliation with the China Zhejiang Art School has resulted in frequent return engagements as a visiting teacher.

Enrico Elisi was trained by renowned pianists and teachers, including Leon Fleisher, Lazar Berman, Alexander Lonquich, Franco Scala, Boris Petrushansky, and Giuseppe Fricelli. Boris Slustky provided him with invaluable mentorship. Elisi's musical education began at the Conservatories of Bologna and Florence in Italy. He further honed his skills at the International Piano Academy of Imola, the Peabody Institute of Johns Hopkins University, and the Taos and Ravinia Festivals. These opportunities allowed him to delve into chamber music with esteemed mentors such as Robert McDonald, Menahem Pressler, Gilbert Kalish, and Claude Frank.

Enrico Elisi is recognized as a Steinway Artist.

External audio
- You may listen to Enrico Elisi performing works by Maurice Ravel, Felix Mendelssohn, Wolfgang Amadeus Mozart, Sergei Prokofiev, Johannes Brahms, Luciano Berio, and Salvatore Sciarrino on SoundCloud.com.
