= Serenade for Strings (Tchaikovsky) =

1880 composition for strings by Pyotr Ilyich Tchaikovsky

- by Pyotr Ilyich Tchaikovsky
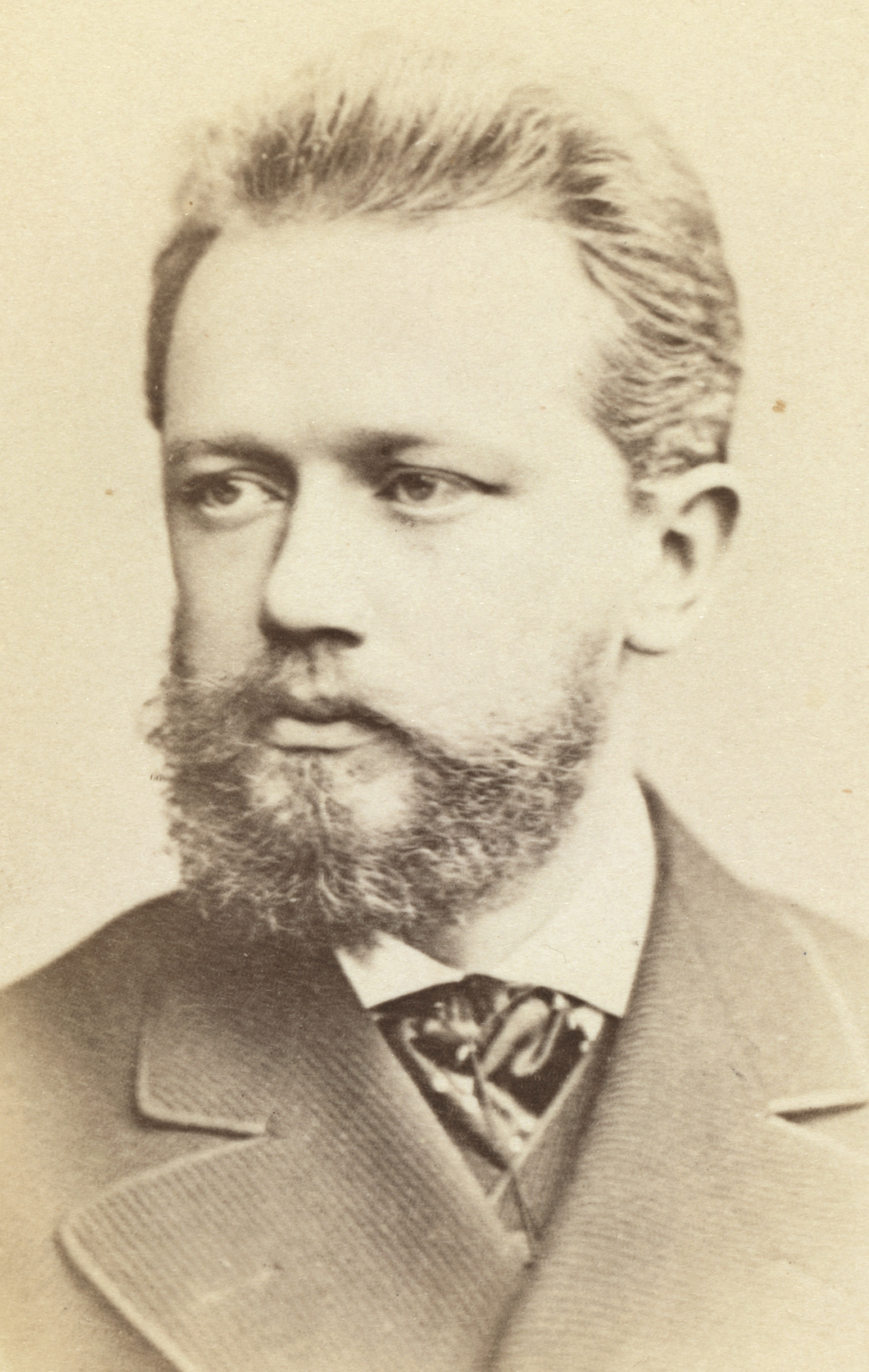
- The composer, c. 1880
- Key: C major
- Opus: 48
- Composed: 1880
- Dedication: Konstantin Albrecht
- Published: 1881, Moscow
- Publisher: P. Jurgenson
- Movements: 4

Premiere
- Date: October 30 1881
- Location: St. Petersburg
- Conductor: Eduard Nápravník

Tchaikovsky's Serenade for Strings in C major, Op. 48, was composed in 1880. It was first performed October 30, 1881, in St. Petersburg at a Russian Musical Society concert conducted by Eduard Nápravník. The Serenade was given a private performance at the Moscow Conservatory on 3 December 1880. Its first public performance was in St Petersburg on 30 October 1881 under Eduard Napravnik.

== Form ==
Serenade for Strings has four movements:

1. Pezzo in forma di sonatina: Andante non troppo – Allegro moderato
2. Valse: Moderato – Tempo di valse
3. Élégie: Larghetto elegiaco
4. Finale (Tema russo): Andante – Allegro con spirito

=== I. Pezzo in forma di sonatina: Andante non troppo – Allegro moderato ===
Tchaikovsky intended the first movement to be an imitation of Mozart's style, and it was based on the form of the classical sonatina, with a slow introduction. The stirring 36-bar Andante introduction is marked "sempre marcatissimo" and littered with double stops in the violins and violas, forming towering chordal structures.

Then, the allegro moderato arrives. This section is characterized by numerous dancing passages by the upper strings and cellos. Then, a darker section of the piece comes, with the violins playing in a minor key and the cellos playing a complicated and exposed passage. Suddenly, the beginning section of the allegro moderato is restated, this time with the rests being replaced by an ascending passage played by the seconds and violas. The piece then transitions into a part where a fast 16th note phrase is passed around across the upper strings and cellos. The section then ends in a G-major cadence.

The B section is then played, with a fast passage played by the firsts and violas. The section is then dotted with fast runs from the cellos and basses. The violins then play a crying phrase, which is echoed by the violas and cellos throughout the remainder of the section. The B part is then restated, this time with hints of a cadence from the lower strings. Suddenly, the passage rises into a final 8th and 16th note run by all of the strings. This is then followed by a scale and a cadence, concluding the first part of the movement.

The entire allegro moderato is then repeated, except that the G major motifs are replaced with C major. The introduction is then restated at the end of the movement, which then concludes with a heavy C chord.

=== II. Valse: Moderato – Tempo di valse ===
The second movement, Valse, or Waltz, has become a popular piece in its own right. Characterized by the melody sung by the first violins, the other parts play a classic waltz rhythm which features a heavy bass note and lighter notes on the second and third beats. Suddenly, the violins climb up to an F♯–A chord, and stay there until coming back down. The second violins join the firsts for the latter half of the melody. It is then passed to the cellos and 2nd violins, played on a lower octave.

The piece then transitions into a B section, where the first violins play repeated descending passages and the cellos and basses play a heavy lower octave passage. The A passage with the violin melody then reappears, this time with pizzicato coming from the lower strings and a harmony played by the violas. The melody then is passed onto the cellos and seconds. Finally, the first violins play a reconfigured version of the melody, this time, descending into a cadence which concludes the movement.

=== III. Élégie: Larghetto elegiaco ===
The third movement, Élégie, is a long slow movement. It echos the motifs of life and death (hence the name Élégie, which literally translates into “song of mourning”), with mournful and shockingly beautiful melodies. The introduction is characterized by a slow and powerful ascending melody by the upper strings and descending countermelody by the lower strings. The introduction then resolves into two heavy D-major chords. The movement then evolves into a section in which the first violins play a romantic melody with the other strings playing a D major arpeggio harmony in pizzicato. The melody is then passed onto the violas and cellos, with the violins playing an echoing countermelody. The seconds play repeated D major arpeggios, while the basses play heavy octaves. The section then concludes with a rising arpeggio.

Then, the B section arrives. This section is characterized by a domiant A bass note. The first violins and cellos play a repeating echoing version of the original melody, this time in a minor key, with the seconds and violas playing repeated triplets out of key to increase tension. The section then explodes into a climax and transitions into a descending melody by the violas, with solid chords played by the rest of the orchestra. The viola then plays the original melody, this time back in its major form. The melody returns to the first violins, which is stretched above its original register. It is dotted with sections of the cellos playing a descending countermelody.

The movement then transitions into a dark section in a minor key. After that, the first violins run free from the orchestra, playing a quick 16th note run, ending on the third of the D major scale. The introduction to this movement is then restated by muted strings, but never resolves. Dark, descending chords litter this section of the movement. Finally, the movement transitions into the ending. The basses play heavy triplets, while the firsts, violas, and cellos play the melody in a minor key. The seconds also play a minor harmony. Eventually, the section descends into a perfect D-major resolution. The movement is concluded by one final ascending scale, before finally resolving on a high D.

=== IV. Finale (Tema russo): Andante — Allegro con spirito ===
The fourth movement, Finale (Tema Russo), is a lighthearted Russian dance, which concludes this piece. The introduction, Andante, is a lighthearted dance played by muted strings, with a D motif. Even though it is in G major, it hints at the leftover D major from the third movement. The end of the introduction is marked with quiet, reflective chords.

Suddenly, the unmuted strings jump into a dance in C major, beginning with the first violins. Repeated 16th note runs dot the section. The violins then play a lush, repeated version of the melody, with full, bright chords from the lower strings. The melody is then passed onto the cellos and basses, with pizzicato echoing from the upper strings. The cellos then play a bright melody centered around Eb major, which is then passed onto the violins. A modified version of the dance is then played, ascending into a climax, which is then brought down by a scale played by the lower strings. The upper strings keep up with repeated 16th note runs, and the entrance melody is then repeatedly passed around the orchestra, before ascending and descending in an E♭-major cadence. The lower strings then play another descending version of the dance, with suspenseful ascending quarter note phrases played by the upper strings. Finally, it bursts into a C♭-major chord, with ascending passages played by the seconds and violas. It then descends once again, to then play a D major chord, also accompanied by ascending passages played by the seconds and violas.

A bridge is reached, this time in C major. A crescendo among the strings transition into the first version of the dance, with a different harmony. 16th note runs follow, which transition into the dancing melody once again. The lower strings then receive their melody once again, before transitioning into the cello melody played before, but in C major instead of Eb. The melody finds its way into the violins. An ascending passage leading into a descending scale by the lower strings ensue. Another repeat of the melody is then passed around by the orchestra, before coming to a C major scale, which is then run through twice, before reaching a stop at the end of the section.

The introduction from the first movement is then restated as a coda. Finally, the introduction collapses back into original dance played by the first violins. The lower strings echo this for the final time, before reaching a powerful C major cadence, which ends the piece.

On the second page of the score, Tchaikovsky wrote, "The larger number of players in the string orchestra, the more this shall be in accordance with the author's wishes."

== Performance history ==
Performance history of Tchaikovsky's Serenade for Strings, excluding the premiere.

- Tiflis, Russian Empire: 8 April 1884, conducted by Mikhail Ippolitov-Ivanov
- New York, United States: 24 January 1885, conducted by Leopold Damrosch at the Academy of Music
- Saint Petersburg, Russian Empire: 17 March 1887, conducted by Tchaikovsky himself (second and third movements only)
- Hamburg, German Empire: 20 January 1888, conducted by Tchaikovsky himself
- Prague, Austria-Hungary: 21 February 1888, conducted by Tchaikovsky himself at the National Theatre
- Paris, France: 28 February 1888, conducted by Tchaikovsky himself (second and third movements only)
- Paris, France: 4 March 1888, conducted by Tchaikovsky himself at Théâtre du Châtelet
- Paris, France: 11 March 1888, conducted by Tchaikovsky himself at Théâtre du Châtelet (second and third movements only)
- London, Great Britain: 22 March 1888, conducted by Tchaikovsky himself at St James's Hall
- Berlin, German Empire: 26 February 1889, conducted by Tchaikovsky himself
- Geneva, Switzerland: 9 March 1889, conducted by Tchaikovsky himself at Théâtre de Neuve
- Kiev, Russian Empire: 2 November 1889, conducted by Aleksandr Vinogradsky
- Amsterdam, Netherlands: 27 April 1890, conducted by Willem Kes at Concertgebouw (second movement only)
- Tiflis, Russian Empire: 1 November 1890, conducted by Tchaikovsky himself
- Vienna, Austria-Hungary: 5 April 1891, conducted by Hans Richter
- Baltimore, United States: 15 May 1891, conducted by Tchaikovsky himself at the Lyceum Theatre
- Philadelphia, United States: 18 May 1891, conducted by Tchaikovsky himself at the Academy of Music
- Warsaw, Russian Empire: 14 January 1892, conducted by Tchaikovsky himself (second and third movements only)
- Brussels, Belgium: 14 January 1893, conducted by Tchaikovsky himself (second and third movements only)
- Odessa, Russian Empire: 3 February 1893, conducted by Tchaikovsky himself (second movement only)
- Kharkov, Russian Empire: 26 November 1893, conducted by Ilya Slatin (second movement only)

== References in other contexts ==
- The score was used as the foundation of the George Balanchine ballet Serenade in 1934.
- The waltz in the second movement was arranged for soprano and full orchestra for the 1945 MGM film Anchors Aweigh under the name "From the Heart of a Lonely Poet" and performed by Kathryn Grayson with José Iturbi conducting the MGM studio orchestra.
- The piece incidentally accompanied the final countdown for the Trinity atomic bomb test July 16, 1945, when it was being broadcast by a Voice of America station on the same frequency being used to transmit test communications.
- The waltz section was also used as the startup theme for British television station Channel Television in the 1980s.
- Excerpts from the score were used in the 2005 ballet Anna Karenina, choreographed by Boris Eifman.
- The waltz was used in the Google Doodle for the 100th anniversary of the completion of the Trans-Siberian Railway in 2016.
- The first movement (Pezzo in forma di sonatina: Andante non troppo — Allegro moderato) is the motif of Stefano Valentini, one of the main antagonists in the game The Evil Within 2.
- Excerpts from the score were used during NBC's broadcast of a 1983 NFL playoff game between the San Diego Chargers and the Pittsburgh Steelers as a lead in to commercial breaks.
- The second movement was used a few times in the 2021 South Korean survival drama TV series Squid Game.
- The waltz in the second movement is featured in "On Wine: How to Select & Serve," which in turn is sampled on the Beastie Boys "The Blue Nun" from "Check Your Head."
- The second movement is featured in the game Grand Theft Auto: San Andreas during the mission Saint Mark's Bistro.
