= Aleksandr Goldenweiser =

Russian and Soviet pianist and composer (1875–1961)

Aleksander Goldenweiser
- Александр Гольденвейзер
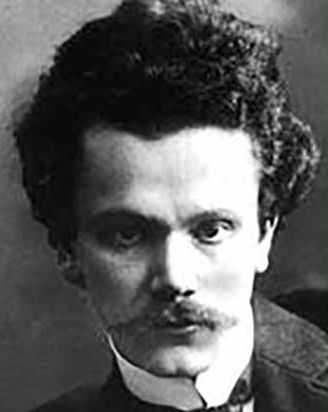
- Aleksander Goldenweiser, c. 1910
- Born: 10 March [O.S. 26 February] 1875; Kishinev, Bessarabia, Russian Empire
- Died: 26 November 1961 (aged 86); Moscow Oblast, Russian SFSR, Soviet Union
- Occupations: Pianist; teacher; composer

Aleksandr Borisovich Goldenweiser, sometimes given as Alexander Borisovich Goldenweiser, (Note: Russian: Александр Борисович Гольденвейзер, romanized: Aleksandr Borisovich Goldenveyzer.) 10 March [O.S. 26 February] 1875 – 26 November 1961) was a Russian and Soviet pianist, teacher and composer.

== Life ==
Aleksandr Borisovich Goldenweiser was born on 10 March 1875 Kishinev (now Chişinău), the capital of Bessarabia Governorate in the Russian Empire. In 1889, he was admitted to the Moscow Conservatory in the class of Alexander Siloti (also Ziloti). He graduated from the Moscow Conservatory in 1895 in the piano class of Pavel Pabst (previously with A.I.Siloti), winning the Gold Medal for Piano in 1897 – in the composition class of Mikhail Ippolitov-Ivanov. He also studied composition with Anton Arensky and counterpoint with Sergei Taneyev (1892–1893).

He joined the faculty of the Conservatory shortly afterward, where he worked as the dean, and during his tenure there, his pupils included Grigory Ginzburg, Lazar Berman, Samuil Feinberg, Rosa Tamarkina, Dmitry Kabalevsky, Galina Eguiazarova, Nikolai Kapustin, Alexander Braginsky, Sulamita Aronovsky, Tatiana Nikolayeva, Dmitry Paperno, Nodar Gabunia, Oxana Yablonskaya, Nelly Akopian-Tamarina, Dmitri Bashkirov, Dmitry Blagoy, and many others. See: List of music students by teacher: G to J#Alexander Goldenweiser.

Rachmaninoff's Second Suite, Op. 17, was dedicated to him as well as Medtner's Lyric Fragments, Op. 23.

He was a close friend of Leo Tolstoy. He published memories of his relationship with Tolstoy in his book Vblizi Tolstogo.

He made a number of renowned recordings as a pianist, including four recordings on piano roll for the Welte-Mignon reproducing piano in 1910. He died on 26 November 1961, in Moscow Oblast.

In 1955, Goldenweiser arranged that his possessions, including his archive, pianos, apartment and all its contents, would become the property of the Soviet Union upon his death. The adjoining apartment was acquired in 1959 in order to create a museum, the Goldenweiser Memorial Flat Museum, open to the public while Goldenweiser and his wife were still living there.

Goldenweiser died in Moscow on 26 November 1961.

== Honours and awards ==
- People's Artist of the RSFSR (1931)
- Stalin Prize, first class (1947)
- Two Orders of Lenin (including 9 March 1945)
- Order of the Red Banner of Labour, three times (27 April 1937, 29 April 1950, 9 March 1955)
- People's Artist of the USSR (1946)

== Selective discography ==
as composer and pianist

- Piano Trio in E minor, Op. 31. Leonid Kogan, violin. Mstislav Rostropovich, cello. Composer, piano. Melodiya D-9123-4 (LP); released 1961

as composer

- Contrapuntal Sketches, Op. 12. Sonata Fantasia', Op. 37. 'Skazka, Op. 39. Jonathan Powell, piano. Toccata TOCC 044, CD, released 2009. The Contrapuntal Sketches were written in the 1930s. With this work Goldenweiser can perhaps stake claim as being the first Russian composer to write a set of polyphonic pieces in each of the major and minor keys, all of which appear on this recording.

as pianist

- Russian Piano School, Vol 1: Alexander Goldenweiser. Music by Tchaikovsky, Arensky, Borodin, Rachmaninoff (also with G. Ginsburg), Medtner, Goldenweiser – original recordings 1946–1955 by Melodiya. NoNoise transfers distributed BMG 74321 25173 2
- Russian Piano School. Rachmaninoff: Suites for Two Pianos nos. 1 & 2; Six Morceaux pour piano duet. Talents of Russia. RCD 16260
- Grieg: Lyric pieces, opp. 12, 43, 47, 65. Melodiya. MEL CD 10 02118
- Medtner: Sonata in E minor for Violin and Piano, op. 57 (with David Oistrakh, violin). Melodiya.
- Catoire: Violin Sonatas nos. 1 & 2 (with David Oistrakh, violin). Melodiya.

== Sources ==
- The New Grove Dictionary of Music and Musicians London: Macmillan, 1980
- Archive of Alexander Goldenweiser Papers at the International Institute of Social History
- Herbert Aptheker: The Fraud of Soviet Anti-Semitism New York, N.Y.: New Era Books, 1962. Online Version
