= Dmitri Novgorodsky =

Russian pianist (born 1965)

Dmitri Novgorodsky (Ukrainian: Дмитро Новгородський; born 1965) is a classical pianist. He is the first Moscow Tchaikovsky Conservatory graduate in piano performance and the first Russian-Soviet musician who has earned the Doctor of Musical Arts in Piano Performance degree from Yale University. He is currently an associate professor of music performance at Ithaca College.

== Biography ==
Novgorodsky was born into a family of musicians in 1965 in Odessa, the former USSR. He began to play the piano at age five and was admitted into a special music school for gifted children a year later. By the age of 16, Mr. Novgorodsky had won the First Prize at the Kazakhstan National Piano Competition, and later the Gold Medal of the Kazakhstan National Festival of the Arts. In 1990, he graduated from the studio of professor Victor Merzhanov at Moscow Tchaikovsky Conservatory with high honors and qualifications of concert pianist, chamber musician and teacher. In 1992, he was offered a full scholarship to study at Yale University with Boris Berman. While at Yale, Novgorodsky received four Distinguished Honorary Awards for the best piano recitals and a Special Faculty Prize to an outstanding pianist in the graduating class.

In 1998, he was granted the "Extraordinary Abilities in the Arts" permanent US residence.

He graduated from Yale in 2003. Novgorodsky became an American citizen in 2004.

== Career ==
Novgorodsky has appeared in Russia, Kazakhstan, France, Belarus, Ukraine, Israel, Canada, Austria, Turkey, Taiwan, and at such venues in the United States as Carnegie Hall, Steinway Hall, Kennedy Center and "Sunday Afternoon Live" recital broadcasts on Wisconsin Public Radio. In April 2002, he became the only Moscow Conservatory alumnus to be honored by an invitation from Raisa Scriabine and the Scriabin Society of America to perform at a Special Scriabin Gala Concert for the Russian Ambassador to the United States.

Together with the clarinetist Arthur Campbell, Novgorodsky gave a world premiere to the "Prophesy from 47 Ursae Majoris" by Andrew Paul MacDonald in 2001. In 2001, the recording of this work won the Third Web Concert Hall Competition, which "...was created to open exciting new frontiers in the performance of serious music, from the point of view both of the performers and of those interested in hearing them, and to do so in a context which radically enlarges the educational impact of musical performance as we move into the Twenty First Century". The composition was released by "Gasparo Records" on CD "Premieres" in the same year. After teaching at the University of Wisconsin–Oshkosh and Grand Valley State University, Michigan, Novgorodsky was appointed as Assistant Professor of Piano at Lawrence University Conservatory of Music in Appleton, Wisconsin in 2003. He resigned his faculty position in 2008. In August 2015, Novgorodsky was appointed into the music performance faculty at Ithaca College. In 2020, he attained the rank of Associate Professor of Music Performance.

== Reviews ==
The New Britain Herald, a newspaper in Connecticut, reviewed Novgorodsky's performance of Chopin's Piano Concerto No. 1 with the Connecticut Virtuosi Chamber Orchestra in New Britain, Connecticut in May, 2001. His solo recital in February 2007 was reviewed by the Lawrence University student newspaper, The Lawrentian. His recent performance as a concerto soloist was reviewed by The Post-Crescent and by the Northeast Wisconsin Music Review.
