= World Music Cultures Center (Moscow Conservatory) =

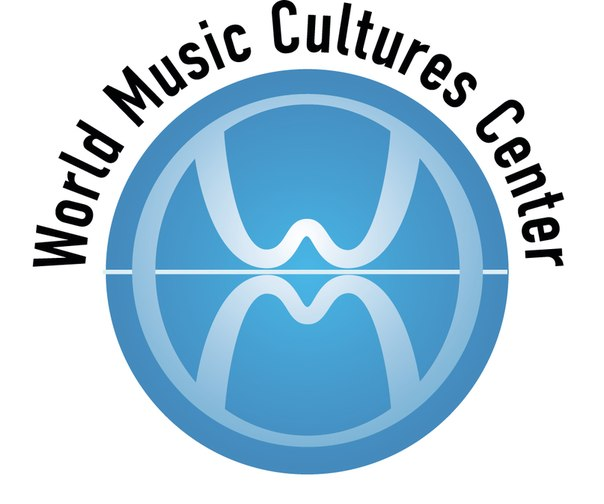
- Formation: September 1976; 49 years ago
- Headquarters: Bolshaya Nikitskaya street, 13
- Head of the center: Margarita Karatygina
- Website: https://mosconservatoria.wixsite.com/wmcc

World Music Cultures Center is a scientific and creative center at the Moscow State Conservatory, which conducts scientific, informational, organizational, concert, festival and educational activities. The scientific and creative center organizes festivals and conducts master classes with famous performers of traditional music from around the world.

== History ==
The “World Music Cultures” structure at the Moscow Conservatory was founded in September 1976 by composer Jivani Mikhailov. Personal connections and acquaintance of the composer with musicians of traditional cultures of Africa, Asia and America had already played a significant role by the time of the creation of “World Music Cultures”. A look at various cultures from the inside and the composer’s direct, in-depth acquaintance with them allowed him to study the deeper layers of traditional cultures and begin to introduce them to the Moscow audience, gradually expanding it.

In the early 1970s. J. Mikhailov’s concept “of the multiplicity and dissimilarity of sound systems” was not taken seriously by many; Soviet musicology had basically only a Eurocentric orientation, trying to embrace all the musical cultures of the world precisely from these ideological positions.

At first, this structure functioned in the form of a training course, then a system of courses “Music cultures of Asia, Africa, America, Australia and Oceania”. At the same time, the Department of the History of Foreign Music established an educational and support structure in the form of the “Sector of World Music Cultures” (1980–1984), and later the Cabinet with the same name (since 1984). At various times, the office operated under the Department of Musical Cultures of the World (1990–1995), then became an independent structure (1995–2003), and in 2003 it was included in the Office for Coordination of International Activities Programs (since 2015 - Office of International cooperation) as the Department-Center “Musical Cultures of the World”. In 2010, the department-center received its current name: the Scientific and Creative Center “World Music Cultures”

== Activities of the center ==
Today, the scientific and creative center operates under the Department of International Cooperation of the Moscow Conservatory and plays an important role in the creation and implementation of various international cultural and musical projects. The center operates the “Russian-Japanese Center for Musical Culture”, as well as a number of creative groups: the Iranian music group “Caravan”, the Chinese music ensemble “Dragon and Phoenix”, the Japanese music ensemble “Wa-On”.

Over the course of many years of cultural activity of the center, a unique fund of materials was accumulated, along with it a special library, a music library and a video library were created. The center organizes numerous concerts, creative meetings, lectures by famous performers of traditional musical cultures, as well as other scientific and educational events, theatrical projects (“The Legend of the Flower of Style”, Opera “O-Natsu”, weeks of Iranian theater in Moscow), and also annually conducts large-scale international creative projects, such as the “Universe of Sound”, “Soul of Japan”, “Descendants of Arctida”, “Gathering Friends” festivals, etc.

The center conducts educational activities at the Moscow Conservatory, an important place in this activity is given to lecture courses for undergraduate and graduate students, in addition to this, diploma and dissertation research is conducted. Along with this, there are classes in traditional Japanese, Chinese, Indian and Iranian music.

Since 1999, the international festival “Soul of Japan” has been held annually from September to December; since 2003, from May to June, “The Universe of Sound”; since 2007, in August, “Gathering Friends”.

In the context of the epidemiological situation with COVID-19 and the closure of concert halls and other venues in Moscow and other Russian cities, the center implemented a number of creative projects online (“Moscow - a crossroads of cultures”, etc.).

The center’s festivals take place not only in Moscow and Russian cities, but sometimes also include concert venues in Japan, China, Colombia and other countries near and far abroad.

The center employs such musicians as Atish Mukhopadhyay (India), Hossein Nursharg (Iran) and others.

Today, the head of the center is Margarita Ivanovna Karatygina.

== Conceptual basis of the center ==
The center's methodology was developed by its founder, Jivani Mikhailov. Its peculiarity lies in the fact that all layers of musical culture (academic, traditional, popular music) are recognized as equally important and they are studied in depth in the context of interaction. At the heart of the methodology, one of the key places is occupied by the regional civilizational approach, on the basis of which nine regional civilizations are identified on the “musical map of the world”, each of which is studied by comparison with each other: Europe, the Near and Middle East, Tropical Africa, South Asia, Central Asia, Southeast Asia, Far East, Australia and Oceania, America.

== Festivals ==
- “The Universe of Sound” (May–June)
- “Gathering Friends” (August)
- "Soul of Japan" (September–December)

== Bibliography ==
- Мациевский, Игорь, ed. (2011). Актуальные проблемы когнитивной музыкологии: Материалы Международной научно-теоретической конференции (Санкт-Петербург, 20-21 июня 2011 г.). СП(б): Российский ин-т истории искусств. p. 30.
- Аль-Халифа, Асим Абдалла (1985). Вопросы современного развития городской музыкальной культуры Судана: диссертация ... кандидата искусствоведения. М. pp. 4–5.
- Ф. Бахтиари (February 2021). "Слушая иранских пардэ-ханов". Караван: от древности к нашим дням (журнал) (in Russian) (87): 92–98.
- Т. А. Алиханов (etc.), ed. (2006). Московская консерватория: материалы и документы из фондов МГК имени П. И. Чайковского и ГЦММК имени М. И. Глинки. М.: Прогресс-Традиция. pp. 210–212. ISBN 5-89826-234-2.
- Миронова, Наталья, ed. (2005). Московская консерватория : от истоков до наших дней : историко-биографический справочник / Моск. гос. консерватория им. П.И. Чайковского, Пробл. науч.-исслед. лаб. музыки и муз. образования; ред.-сост. Н. А. Миронова]. - Москва : Прогресс-Традиция, 2005. - 743 с. : портр.; 24 см.; ISBN 5-89826-232-6 : 1500. М.: Прогресс-Традиция. pp. 250–252. ISBN 5-89826-232-6.
- Коляда, Мария Сергеевна (2007). Мировоззрение воинов в японской культуре XIII века : автореферат дис. ... кандидата философских наук. Москва. p. 2.

== Links ==
- Официальный сайт Научно-творческого центра "Музыкальные культуры мира"
