= Lazar Berman =

Russian classical pianist (1930–2005)

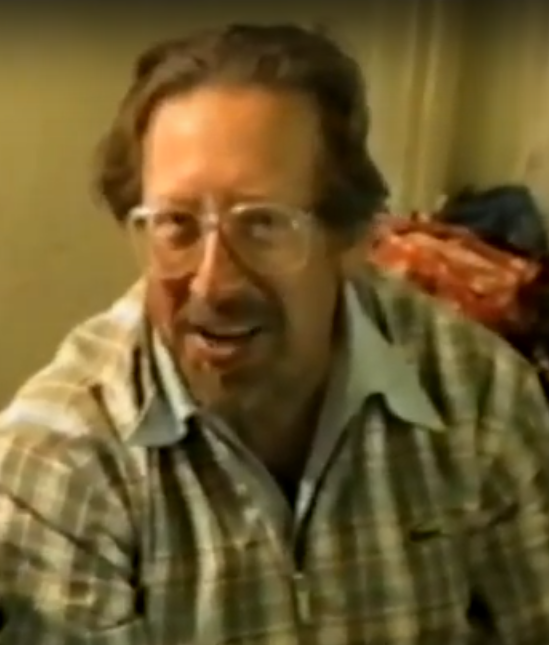
- Lazar Berman in 1988

Background information
- Born: Lazar Berman; February 26, 1930; Leningrad, Soviet Union
- Died: February 6, 2005 (aged 74) Florence, Italy
- Genre: Classical piano
- Years active: 1935–2005

Lazar Naumovich Berman (Russian: Ла́зарь Нау́мович Бе́рман, Lazar Naumovich Berman; February 26, 1930 – February 6, 2005) was a Soviet Russian classical pianist, Honoured Artist of the RSFSR (1988). He was hailed for a huge, thunderous technique that made him a thrilling interpreter of Liszt and Rachmaninoff and a late representative of the grand school of Russian Romantic pianism. Emil Gilels described him as a "phenomenon of the musical world."

== Biography ==
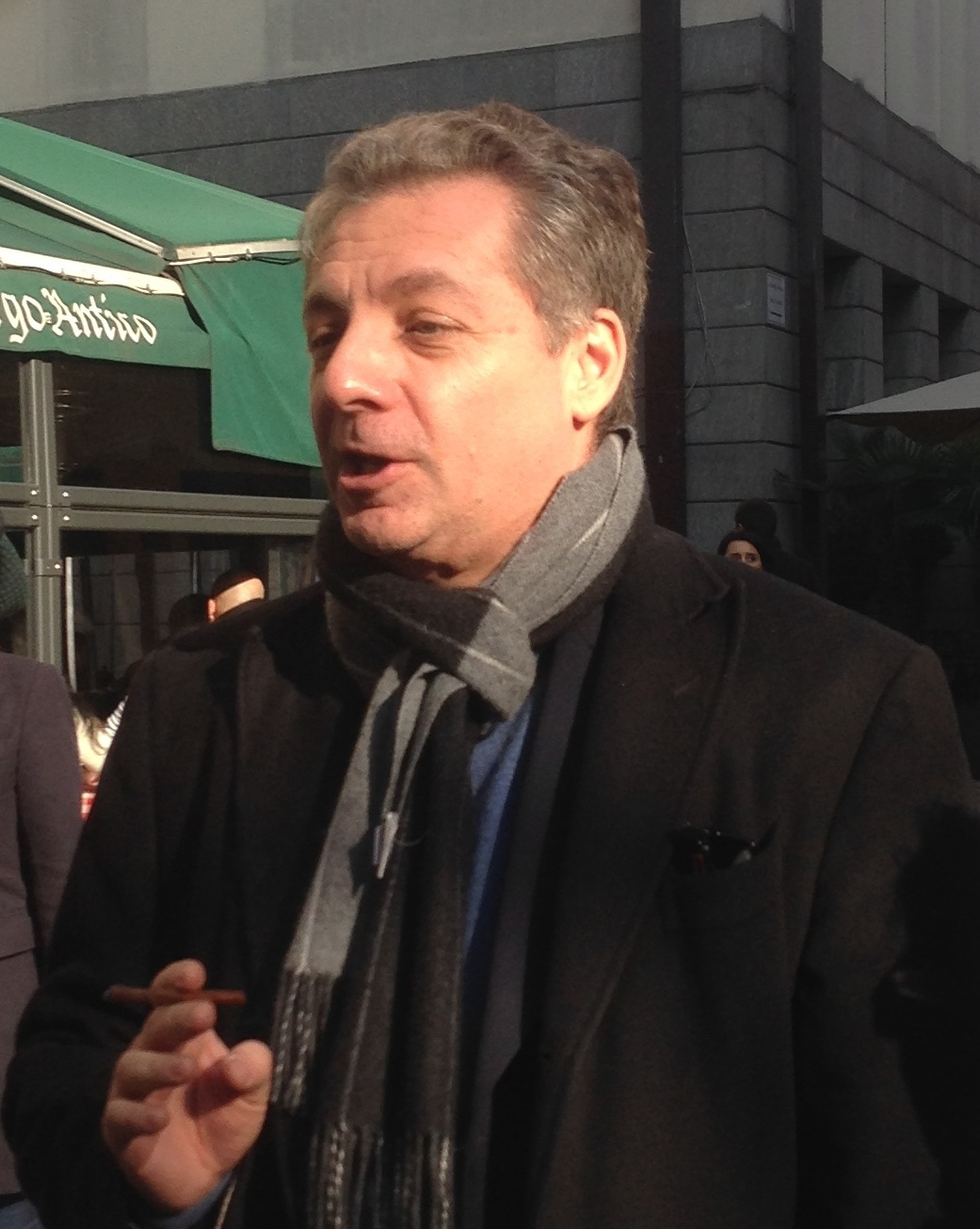
Pavel Berman, Lazar Berman's son

Berman was born to Jewish parents in Leningrad (Russian SSR, Soviet Union). His mother, Anna Lazarevna Makhover, had played the piano herself until prevented by hearing problems. She introduced her son to the piano at the age of two. Berman entered his first competition at the age of three, and recorded a Mozart fantasia and a mazurka that he had composed himself at the age of seven, before he could even read music.

Berman was first noticed while participating in city young talents competition. The jury under the chairmanship of Leonid Nikolaev noticed the child's "rare exceptional case of musical and piano skills". Now, after being officially given title "prodigy" at the age of four, he started studying with Leningrad State Conservatory professor, Samariy Savshinsky.

In 1939 when Berman was nine, the family moved to Moscow so that he could study with Aleksandr Goldenweiser, first at Central Musical School, and then at the Moscow Conservatory, where he graduated in 1953. In 1940, he made his formal debut playing Mozart's Piano Concerto No. 25 with the Moscow Philharmonic Orchestra. In 1941, students, pupils and parents were evacuated to Samara (then Kuybyshev), a city on the Volga, because of World War II. Living conditions were so poor that his mother had to cut the fingers from a pair of gloves to allow him to continue to practise without freezing his hands.

He subsequently began to acquire international prominence. At the age of 12 he played Franz Liszt's La campanella to a British audience over the radio. In 1956 became a laureate of two international piano competitions: Queen Elisabeth Competition in Belgium, with Vladimir Ashkenazy, and the Franz Liszt Competition in Budapest, Hungary. As a result of these accomplishments, Berman was offered an international tour, and landed a recording deal, which included recordings of Liszt's sonata and Beethoven's "Appassionata". In 1958, he performed in London and recorded for SAGA.

From 1959 to 1971 Berman was not allowed to travel abroad due to his marriage to a French national (the marriage soon fell apart); however, he continued to tour around Soviet Union, and did some recordings at Melodia studio, including Liszt's Transcendental Études. That recording became one of the first Soviet recordings done with the use of stereo technology.

In 1968 he married Valentina Sedova and in 1970 their son, Pavel, was born.

From the mid 1970s, Berman was again allowed to tour abroad, which he did to high acclaim.

When The New York Times critic Harold C. Schonberg heard Berman in Moscow in 1961, he wrote: ‘This pianist has 20 fingers that blaze with fire’.

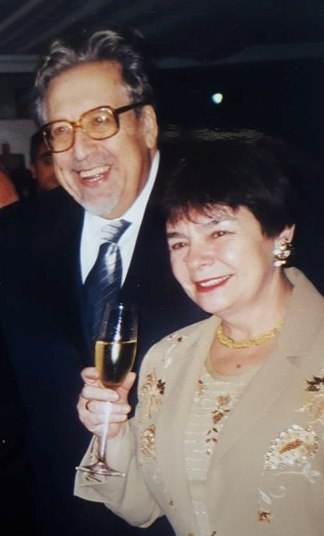
Lazar and Valentina Berman (2000)

Although he was known to international music aficionados who had heard the occasional recording on the Russian Melodiya record label, as well as those who visited the Soviet Union, he was not generally well known outside Russia before his 1975 American tour, organized by the impresario Jacques Leiser. His now legendary New York debut at the 92nd Street Y, where he played Liszt's Transcendental Études, struck the music world like lightning. He became an overnight sensation. Before that, he had been generally restricted to the Soviet concert circuit, playing on old and decrepit pianos to audiences of varied degrees of interest. Invitations to tour outside the Soviet Union were ignored by the Soviet state concert agency, Gosconcert. He lived in a tiny two-room apartment in Moscow, with a grand piano occupying an entire room. But after his 1975 tour, he was immediately in great demand, with Deutsche Grammophon, EMI, and CBS vying to record him. He recorded the Tchaikovsky First Piano Concerto with Herbert von Karajan, as well as broadcasting it on international television with Antal Doráti, to mark United Nations Day in 1976. In 1977, he played the Prokofiev Piano Concerto No. 1 and the Rachmaninov Piano Concerto No. 3 at a New York Philharmonic concert conducted by Leonard Bernstein.

His playing of Chopin is well documented, in both a concert film and a Deutsche Grammophon recording of the polonaises from the 1970s.

Most of his British appearances came in the late 1970s and early 1980s. In December 1976, he performed music by Sergei Prokofiev and Franz Liszt at the Royal Festival Hall.

In 1980, at the height of his popularity, Berman was again barred from leaving the Soviet Union. This time it was because a book by an American writer (censored in the USSR) was found in his luggage while he was passing customs in Moscow's airport.

In August 1990 Berman left the USSR for Norway, followed by final relocation to Italy, where he became a teacher at the International Piano Academy ‘Incontri Col Maestro’ in Imola. Four years later he became an Italian citizen, and the following year he was invited to the Musical School of Weimar, Germany, where he continued teaching until 2000. He often performed along with his son, violinist Pavel Berman.

Berman died in 2005, survived by his second wife, Valentina Sedova, also a pianist, and their son, talented violinist and conductor Pavel Berman. His students included Sonya Bach, Italian pianists Giuliano Mazzocante, Maurizio Baglini, Enrico Elisi, and Enrico Pace, Vladimir Stoupel, Rutsuko Yamagishi, Ioana Lupascu, Gintaras Januševičius, Vardan Mamikonian, Victor Chestopal, Rueibin Chen, Antonio Formaro and Viktoriya Yermolyeva, as well as Korean pianist Chong Park and Japanese pianist Chiharu Aizawa, who later got married and perform as the piano duo “Duo VIVID”.

Berman is buried at the Cimitero delle Porte Sante in Florence. The epitaph on his burial stone says: "You and your music are always with us".
