= Rueibin Chen =

Taiwanese concert pianist

Rueibin Chen (Chinese: 陳瑞斌; pinyin: Chén Ruìbīn; Taiwanese Hokkien: Tân Sūipin) is a Taiwanese-Austrian concert pianist, who was selected by the government in a talent search and sent to Vienna, where he obtained a concert diploma at the Conservatory. Subsequently, he received a soloist's examination award from the Hannover Hochschule für Musik and then continued his study under the Russian pianist Lazar Berman.

== Early life and education ==
Rueibin Chen was born in Tainan City, into the family of an elementary school music teacher. His parents noticed his musical talent as early as the age of two. At five years old, his father started his piano lessons, practicing four hours daily. At the age of six he won his first piano competition in Taiwan playing Beethoven's piano sonata "Pathétique."

At the age of 13 he was selected by the Taiwanese government as extraordinarily gifted student and was granted a passport to study abroad. Accompanied by his uncle, who was his piano teacher at the time, he left home for Vienna and passed the entrance exam of the Conservatory. It provided scholarships but did not provide lodging nor piano; with the help of an uncle, he was settled in an apartment and his uncle then returned to Taiwan. It was ten years before he saw his family again, when he was invited back to Taiwan to perform at the presidential concert.

At the Vienna Conservatory he was the youngest student admitted, under special waiver of age requirement, into the conservatory division, all his classmates being twenty-something competition winners. During those years he devotedly practiced piano to the extent that he got evicted by landlords several times for disturbing neighbors. Besides playing piano, he developed a passion for opera.

At the Vienna Conservatory Chen studied with master teacher Dianko Iliew. After graduating with a diploma of piano performance on highest mark, he continued to study under maestro Arie Vardi at the Hannover Hochschule für Musik and received the soloist's examination award. Later he studied with the Russian piano virtuoso Lazar Berman and was the only Asian among the maestro's limited number of disciples.

== Career ==
=== Soloist ===
Ruiebin Chen debuted at the age of ten with the Taipei Symphony Orchestra. He was named the Principal Soloist of "Moldova" Iasi and Tirgu Mures Philharmonic Orchestra in Romania. As a solo pianist, he appeared in many orchestras around the world, including: the Los Angeles Philharmonic, Utah Symphony, Pacific Symphony, Budapest Symphony, Prague Symphony, Czech State Philharmonic of Brno, Moscow State Symphony, Russian State Symphony, Polish National Radio Symphony, Singapore Symphony, New Philharmonia Japan, Shanghai Symphony, National Symphony Taiwan, Taipei Symphony, Hong Kong Sinfonietta and London Chamber Players, among others.

Chen has been the soloist for many different orchestras around the world. He's also been invited to play in various festivals such as:the International Salzburg Music Festival, Vienna Spring Festival, Schleswig-Holstein Music Festival, Hong Kong Festival, Taipei Music Festival, Taipei Arts Festival, the International Rachmaninoff Music Festival in Moscow, the Janáček Music Festival in Czechoslovakia, the Chopin Festivals, and more. He made his European debut in the Grosser Saal of the Konzerthaus in Vienna in 1984.

Depicted "...one of those geniuses that come along once in twenty years..." (Neue Zuercher Zeitung, Switzerland), Chen's career as a concert pianist kick-started upon his victories at major international piano competitions.

At 16 he became the youngest winner of the Rachmaninoff Piano Competition. Before the age of 20 he already won eighteen medals at major international piano competitions, five of them gold medals. The competitions he won including the world-renowned: Rubinstein(Tel Aviv), Chopin(Warsaw), Bachauer (Utah), Rome, Rachmaninoff and Bellini (Italy), to name a few.

Chen debuted at the age of ten with the Taipei Symphony Orchestra. He made his European debut at the Vienna Konzerthaus in 1984. As a soloist he has performed with the a number of major orchestras. Chen has performed at the Salzburg Music Festival, Vienna Spring Festival, Schleswig-Holstein Music Festival, Hong Kong Festival, Taipei Music Festival, Taipei Arts Festival, the International Rachmaninoff Music Festival in Moscow, the Janáček Music Festival in Ostrava, the Chopin Festivals, and more.

Regularly touring the world, Chen has performed at all the major concert venues including the Musikverein (Vienna), Konzerthaus (Vienna), Gewandhaus (Leipzig), Bolshoi Hall (Moscow), F. Mann Auditorium (Tel Aviv), Opera House (Sydney), Carnegie Hall (NY), Lincoln Center (NY), Kennedy Center (Washington D.C.), Davies Symphony Hall (San Francisco), Walt Disney Concert Hall (Los Angeles), Segerstrom Concert Hall (Southern California), Hollywood Bowl (Los Angeles), Verizon Wireless Amphitheater (Southern California), Suntory Hall (Tokyo), the Concert Hall at National Center for the Performing Arts (Beijing), Oriental Art Center (Shanghai), Cultural Center (Hong Kong), and National Concert Hall (Taipei).

Chen is known for performing the complete Rachmaninoff piano concertos and "Rhapsody on a Theme of Paganini" in two consecutive evenings. The rarely heard Rachmaninoff "Three Nocturnes" was premiered by him in Vienna, Asia and California, USA. He made history in being the first Taiwan-born pianist invited by the Chinese government to perform the "Yellow River Piano Concerto" in China, and impressed critics with his "unimaginable" and "unbelievably passionate" performance of the iconic piece.

New composition of piano solos and concertos are also included in his repertoire. The "Love River Piano Concerto," composed for piano and orchestra of Chinese instruments, was premiered by him in Taiwan, Hong Kong (Cultural Center), Sydney (Opera House) and New York (Lincoln Center). He also premiered the "Wintry Night Trilogy," a large-scale theatrical composition based on the epic literary work of the same title.

== Other projects ==
Aside from live performances, Chen has also performed on radio shows and acted as a music director for various chamber festivals. Chen is also an active chamber musician and has performed with international chamber groups such as the Lark Quartet and Shanghai Quartet. He has given master classes in musical strongholds such as the New England Conservatory in Boston and the Masterplayer International Music Academy in Lugano. He has also served as a jury member in international piano competitions in Switzerland. Chen has devoted much of his time in helping the underprivileged and various causes. In 2012, he was the keynote celebrity performer at the American Red Cross Gala in Los Angeles and performed for the gala guests and Ms. Jane Seymour. The same year, he organized the first National Piano Competition for Disabled Youngsters in Taiwan. Most recently, he participated in a special project called “Play Me I’m Yours” with the Los Angeles Chamber Orchestra and a Benefit Concert in honor of Maestro Marvin Hamlisch with the Pasadena Symphony.

== Recordings ==
Chen has produced a dozen CD recordings with labels such as Universal, Naxos International, KKM Austria and Jingo Records with works by Chopin, Liszt, Wagner-Liszt, Grieg, Tchaikovsky, Debussy, Rachmaninoff, Stravinsky, Piazolla and his own transcriptions. His concerts have been broadcast on many radio and television programs in Europe, Asia, America, and Australia.

== Prizes and recognition ==
In addition to the awards from various international piano competitions, Chen has been the recipient of various recognitions such as the "Bösendorfer" prize in Vienna and was chosen by the Minister of Culture in Taiwan as the "Best Young Artist". Chen won the "Best Prize for Contributions to Music" at Salzburg International Music Festival and the "Albert Roussel Prize" in Paris. He was invited by the President of Taiwan, Teng-Hui Lee to his Festival Concert at the Presidential Palace, which was broadcast by national radio and television networks. He was awarded the "Taiwan Millennium Best Artistic Performance Award" in 2000, the "Golden Melody Awards" for "Best Performance" and for "Best Album", and the "Character of Highest Potential" in Taiwan. Chen was also honored by the County Supervisor of Greater Los Angeles County for promoting diplomacy between the United States and Taiwan through music with his solo recital at the Walt Disney Concert Hall)

== Reviews and critique ==
Chen's musicianship has been highly praised by many renowned musicians and critics. Dietrich Fischer-Dieskau was particularly impressed with his astonishing technique. Spanish pianist Alicia de Larrocha described his playing as "magnificent" and "full of promise." After his performance of Rachmaninoff's second Piano Sonata in a piano competition, he received tremendous accolades from former New York Times critic Harold C. Schonberg, who wrote that Chen's interpretation was the best he had heard by a young artist for a long time. The Boston Globe raved, "He plays with white-hot energy, steel-fingered power and athletic virtuosity,” and that he also “show(s) that he can play with delicacy and imagination. Additionally, Christoph Braendle, a well-known Swiss writer, gives a detailed account of the Taiwanese-Austrian pianist's musical achievements in his book, Die Wiener.
