= Sergey Musaelyan =

Russian pianist

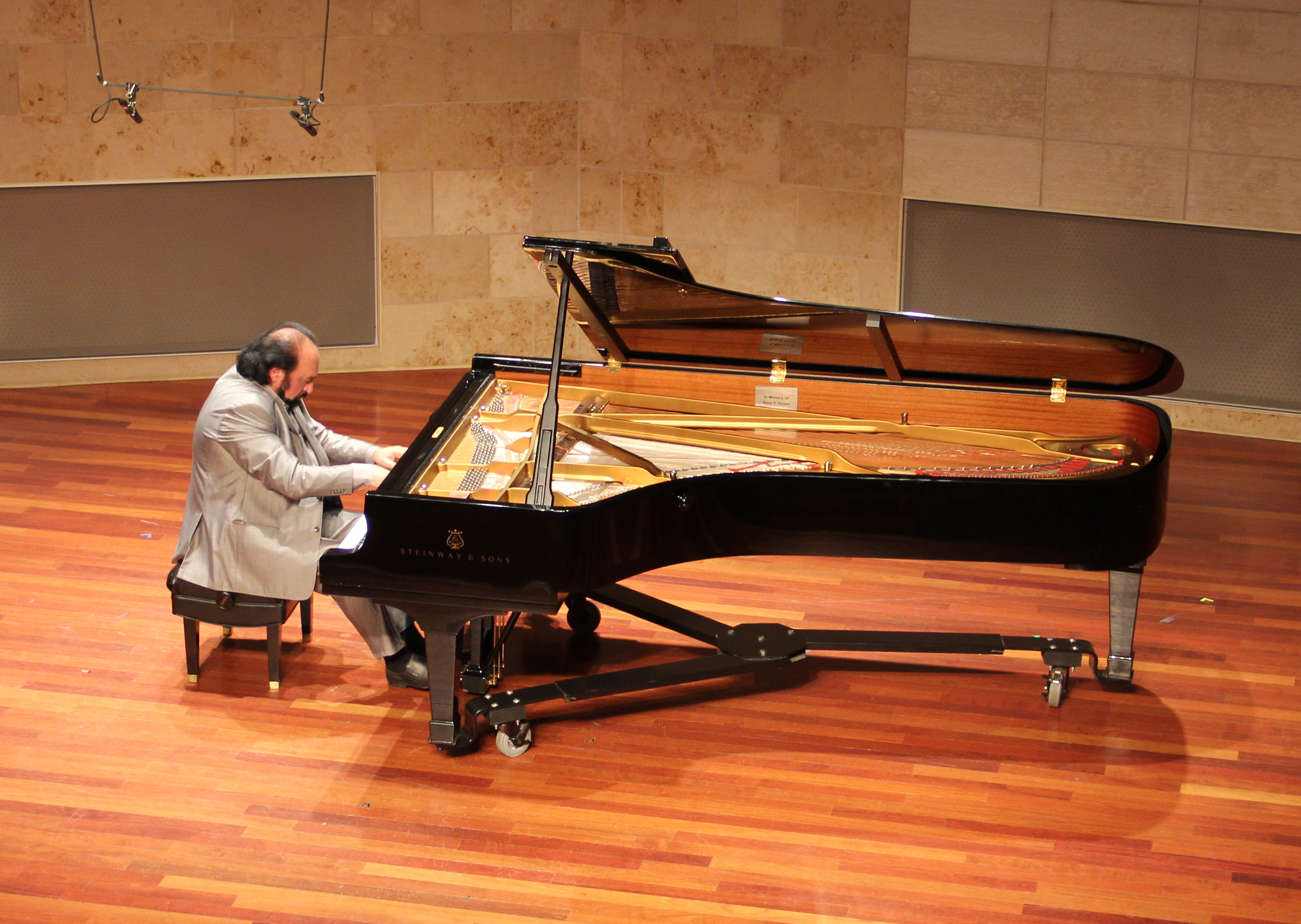
- Sergey Musaelyan during his concert in San Francisco, USA, July 18, 2016

Background information
- Born: Сергей Александрович Мусаелян; November 23, 1950 (age 75)
- Origin: Moscow, Soviet Union
- Genres: Classical music
- Instrument: Piano

Sergey Aleksandrovich Musaelyan (Russian: Сергей Александрович Мусаелян; born November 23, 1950, in Moscow) is a Russian pianist. He is of Armenian descent. He is a member of The Berkeley Hillside Club, an artistic organization that supports notable musicians and artists.

== Life and career ==
=== Parents ===
Musaelyan's father, Aleksander Musaelyan, was a mining engineer, who took part in the construction of the first Moscow Metro. His mother, Eleonor Musaelyan (née Balayan), an Honoured Cultural Worker of the Russian SFSR, was a music teacher; she studied under Konstantin Igumnov and Alexander Goedicke in the Moscow Conservatory, and went on to work at the Conservarory's Central Music School.

=== Education ===
Musaelyan's first piano lessons were with his mother. In 1958, he was admitted to the Central Music School of the Moscow Conservatory and studied with A Sumbatyan, T Bobovitch, E Musaelyan and E Timakin. He later studied first with G Axelrod and Professor Y Flier, a teacher and pianist who was also a People's Artist of the USSR. After Conservatory, Musaelyan entered the graduate school Gnessin State Musical College and studied with Professor B Berlin.

=== Career ===
He took part in the 1976 Vianna da Motta International Music Competition in Lisbon. That year he joined Mosconcert and began to give concerts across the USSR.

In 1988, Sviatoslav Richter took an interest in Musaelyan's career. Richter gave Musaelyan quite contradictory characterisations in his diaries. However, he began to support Musaelyan, and thanks to his help the pianist started to give concerts outside the Soviet Union. Since the late 80s, Musaelyan has toured in Europe, North and South America, Korea, and China.

Also in 1988, Sergey Musaelyan met famous Finnish musicologist and journalist Seppo Heikinheimo. Musaelyan gave more than 100 concerts in Finland for a year with Heikinheimo's help. In 1989, the pianist gave a recital for the Red Cross in Geneva. Together with Araik Babajanyan, he founded the Arno Babajanyan Memorial Foundation in 1990. Festivals in memory of Babajanyan have been organized in Moscow, Yerevan and Los Angeles. The first international chamber music festival to be held in Mikkeli (Finland) had Musaelyan as Artistic Director and Vladimir Ashkenazy as Honorary President. After 2000, the pianist gave concerts in Russia and toured the United States, Denmark and Poland.

In 2011, Sergey Musaelyan was involved in the creation of the Yakov Flier Piano Arts Development Fund. He participated in a festival to mark the 100th anniversary of Flier's birth in 2012. The festival was also attended by other students of Flier: M.Pletnev with the Russian National Orchestra, V Feltsman, I Berkovich, D Ratser, A Zandmanis, M Abramyan, I Olovnikov and others.

Since 2005, Musaelyan has also been engaged in teaching, giving master classes at University of Texas–Pan American and the M.M.Ippolitov-Ivanov State Musical Pedagogical Institute in Moscow, and lecturing on pianistic art in different countries.

Sergey Musaelyan's piano repertoire includes works from Bach to contemporary composers. He has a particular focus on the works of Chopin and Rachmaninoff.

Sergey Musaelyan has at various times performed with such conductors as Vladimir Ashkenazy, Valery Gergiev, Ulf Soderblom, Mikhail Pletnev, Osmo Vanska, Saulius Sondeckis, Fuat Mansurov, Peter Dabrowski, Kristjan Järvi, and Konstantin Krimets.

== Honours ==
- Honoured artist of Russian Federation (1999)
