= Houtaf Khoury =

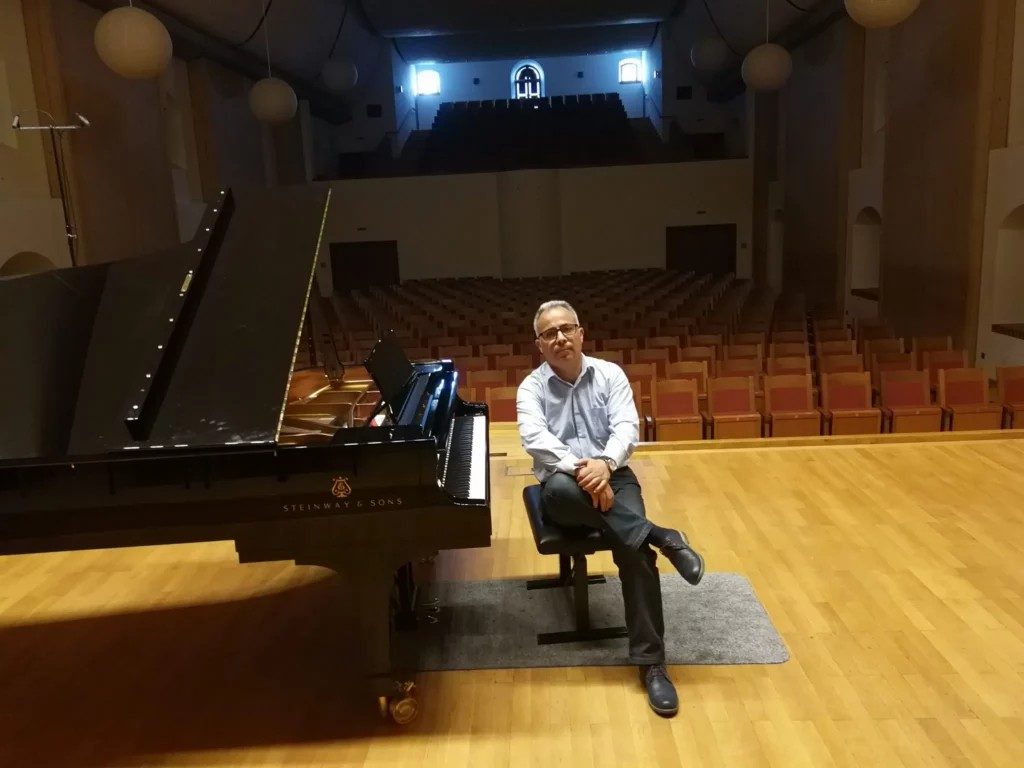

Background information
- Born: June 19, 1967 (age 58)
- Origin: Lebanon
- Occupation: Composer

Houtaf Khoury (born 1967) is a Lebanese contemporary classical composer. His works, which include symphonies, concertos, chamber, solo, and vocal music, have been performed internationally in the Americas, Europe, and the Middle East.

== Early life and education ==
Khoury began his early musical education in Lebanon, studying piano and composition locally. In 1988, he received a scholarship to attend the National Tchaikovsky Music Academy in Kyiv, Ukraine. He graduated with a Master of Music with distinction in 1993 and later completed a PhD in musicology in 1997.

== Career ==
After his studies, Khoury returned to Lebanon, where he served as a professor of composition and orchestration at the Lebanese National Higher Conservatory of Music in Beirut from 1997 to 2000. His body of work includes multiple symphonies and concertos, as well as chamber and solo pieces. His compositions have been performed by orchestras such as the Bamberger Symphoniker and the National Symphony Orchestra of Ukraine, among others. Recordings of his music have been issued by classical music labels including Grand Piano/Naxos, Nimbus Alliance, and Toccata Classics.

== Musical style ==
Khoury’s music blends elements from various international traditions. He has expressed views aligning with composers who emphasize communicative and expressive elements in music, rather than strict adherence to avant-garde techniques.

== Personal life ==
Khoury is married to the pianist Tatiana Primak Khoury, who has performed and recorded many of his piano works. They have two children and reside in Tripoli.
