= Waleed Howrani =

Lebanese-American composer and pianist (born 1948)

Waleed Howrani (born 1948) is a Lebanese-American composer and pianist. He was born in New York, spent much of his childhood in Beirut and studied piano at Moscow’s Central Music School and the Tchaikovsky Conservatory.

== Biography ==
Born in New York in 1948, Waleed Howrani was reared in Beirut where he studied piano, theory and harmony privately while engaging in trials of his first Opuses. At thirteen, he came to the attention of Aram Khatchaturian, who arranged for him to receive scholarships to study piano at Moscow's Central Music School and the Tchaikovsky Conservatory (1964–1973). He spent three years there (1966–1969) under the tutelage of Emil Gilels.

By the time Howrani was nineteen, he had been awarded the Certificate of Honor at the International Tchaikovsky Competition and the Laureate at the Queen Elisabeth Music Competition, paving the way to concert tours in the former Soviet Union, East and West Europe, the Middle East, as well as in the Americas.

After settling in the United States in 1973, Howrani pursued his lifelong interest in creating music by studying composition with William Albright. As a composer, he has been the recipient of a number of honors, including the Michigan Council for the Arts Award for his Animal Rags for piano; the Artistic Excellence Award from Wayne County, Michigan; two Khalil Gibran Fine Arts Awards; and a grant from the Hariri Foundation. In 2008 his Concerto for Alto Saxophone, Strings and Percussion received its world premiere in London by the English Chamber Orchestra under the baton of Clark Rundell, with Simon Haram as soloist.

In addition to giving concerts, Howrani continues to compose and to teach. He currently resides in Ann Arbor, Michigan.

“Critics worldwide have sung their praises for Howrani. His technical command, close attention to minute details, and lucid interpretive powers are buoyed by a poetic sensitivity that is at once refined and free spirited. - The Washington Post

== Works ==
Orchestral:

- 1990: Concerto for Alto Saxophone, Strings and Percussion, 1990

Chamber Music:

- 1982: Exotica for Alto Saxophone & Piano
- 1984: Life Cycle for Flute & Piano

Piano:

- 1986: Hikaya Raheeba, (Alarming Story)
- 1988: Animal Rags
- 1993: Bayoogie Woogie
- 1995: Lebanese Rhapsody
- 1998: Alma Mater
- 2003: Nemo's Symphony
- 2005: Fire Dance
- 2012: Sweet Geriatrics
