= Nelly Akopian-Tamarina =

Russian pianist (1941–2025)

Nelly Surenovna Akopian-Tamarina (Russian: Нелли Суреновна Акопян-Тамарина; 5 January 1941 – 19 June 2025) was a Russian pianist.

== Life and career ==
Born in Moscow, performing Haydn concertos publicly with orchestra by the age of nine, she studied with Anaida Sumbatyan at the Moscow Central Music School. At the Moscow Conservatory, she was one of the last students of Aleksandr Goldenweiser, continuing with Dmitri Bashkirov. She won the Gold Medal at the 1963 Robert Schumann International Competition for Pianists and Singers in Zwickau. In 1974, she was awarded the Robert Schumann Prize. Akopian-Tamarina made several recordings for Melodiya, including the Chopin Preludes, op. 28, and the Piano Concerto of Robert Schumann, the last with the Moscow Philharmonic Orchestra. Subsequently effaced from public life, blocked in the Soviet Union from giving concerts, she turned to painting, exhibiting her watercolours in Moscow.

Akopian-Tamarina made her London début at the Queen Elizabeth Hall in 1983 playing Schumann and Chopin. Other highlights of the 1980s included the Brahms Piano Quintet with the Vienna Musikverein Quartet; and a series of "Romantic Fantasia" recitals in the Amsterdam Concertgebouw. From 1989 to 2006, her commitments included an artistic consultancy at the Prague Conservatory, masterclasses at the Pálfi Palace, and appointments in London at the Royal Academy of Music and the Royal College of Music. Dating from this period, her first British recording of the Schumann Fantasy was featured in Brilliant Classics’ 2009 collection Legendary Russian Pianists.

In October 2002, following an absence of twenty-five years, she was invited back to Russia, appearing in the Bolshoi Hall of the Moscow Conservatory. Between 2008 and 2010, she gave a trilogy of recitals at the Wigmore Hall, dedicated to Brahms, Schumann, Janáček and Chopin.

In 2017, her all-Brahms recording of the Variations and Fugue on a theme by Handel and Ballades, Op. 10 was released by Pentatone. These sessions were from 20 years earlier in Snape Maltings, and partly recorded surreptitiously, with Akopian-Tamarina unaware that the recording producer had returned to the studio for part of the sessions. Following a long illness, she died in London on 19 June 2025, at the age of 84.

== Select discography ==
- Slavonic Reflections, In recital at Wigmore Hall. PENTATONE PTC 5186756 (2020)
- Brahms - Ballades Op. 10 / Variations & Fugue on a theme by Handel Op. 24. PENTATONE PTC 5186677 (2017)
- Schumann - Fantasy Op. 17 / Arabesque Op. 18. BRILLIANT CLASSICS 9014/21 (2009)
