= IClassical Academy =

Swiss educational online music video producer

iClassical Academy
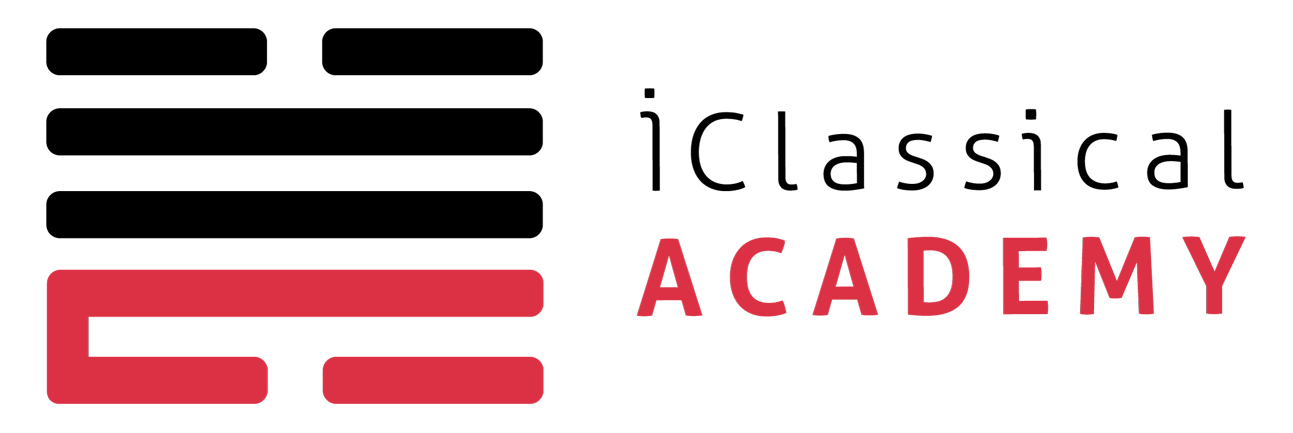
- Founders: Edgar Cohen and Pierre Perrenoud
- Location: Crans-Montana, Switzerland
- Product: Online music classes and courses
- Services: E-learning, classical music education
- Official languages: English
- Website: iclassical-academy.com

iClassical Academy produces educational online videos for musicians. Located in Crans-Montana, Switzerland.

iClassical Academy provides master classes and courses for piano, violin, cello, conducting, guitar and trumpet. Since October 2020, it has also offered courses in music & career and other business-related skills to complement the curriculum.

iClassical Academy also offers music teachers the possibility to create and publish their own courses under the label musiMentors.

== Professors ==
Musicians who teach through iClassical Academy include David Geringas, Mischa Maisky, Leonidas Kavakos, András Schiff, Tabea Zimmermann, Peter Frankl, Miriam Fried, Jukka-Pekka Saraste, Ricardo Castro, Virginie Robilliard, Rudolf Koelman, Gülsin Onay, Hagai Shaham, Dmitry Yablonsky, Amit Peled, Klaidi Sahatci, Sergey Ostrovsky, Vera Tsu Weiling, Evangeline Benedetti, Uri Vardi, Gyorgy Pauk, Denis Zhdanov, Jana Gandelman, Maria Tchaikovskaya, Maurizio Baglini, Zvi Plesser, Peter Szabo, Sander Sittig, Oxana Yablonskaya, Silvia Chiesa and Marco Pierobon.

== Partners ==
- Medici TV
- Naxos Video Library
- Sibelius Academy
