= Yevgeny Malinin =

Russian pianist (1930-2001)

Yevgeny Malinin Евгений Малинин
- Born: 8 November 1930; Moscow, Russia
- Died: 6 April 2001 (aged 70) Kassel, Germany
- Genres: Classical music
- Occupation: Pianist
- Instrument: Piano

Yevgeny Malinin (8 November 1930 – 6 April 2001), PAU, was a Soviet and Russian pianist.

== Biography ==
Malinin was born in Moscow. A disciple of Heinrich Neuhaus, he began his career while a student at the Moscow Conservatory. In 1949 he won (ex-aequo with his fellow student Tamara Guseva) the International Youth and Students Festival in Budapest, and was awarded the 7th prize at the IV International Chopin Piano Competition; four years later he tied with Philippe Entremont for the 2nd prize at the Long-Thibaud Competition. He graduated in 1954, and served as Neuhaus's assistant for three years.

He taught until 1998, and was head of the piano department at the Moscow Conservatory (1972–78). In 1976 he was a jury member for the Paloma O'Shea Santander International Piano Competition. Malinin was active as a concert pianist mainly in the USSR area, but also performed in Japan, USA, Great Britain, Poland, Spain, Finland and France, where he settled as a pedagogue, founding with Thérèse Dussaut a music institute (1988–91).

He made several recordings for EMI or CBS during the 1960s and regularly for Melodya in USSR.

He died in Kassel, Germany aged 70. His brother Vladimir is a violinist.
