= Moscow Conservatory =

Russian musical educational institution

Coordinates: 55°45′23″N 37°36′16″E

Moscow State Tchaikovsky Conservatory
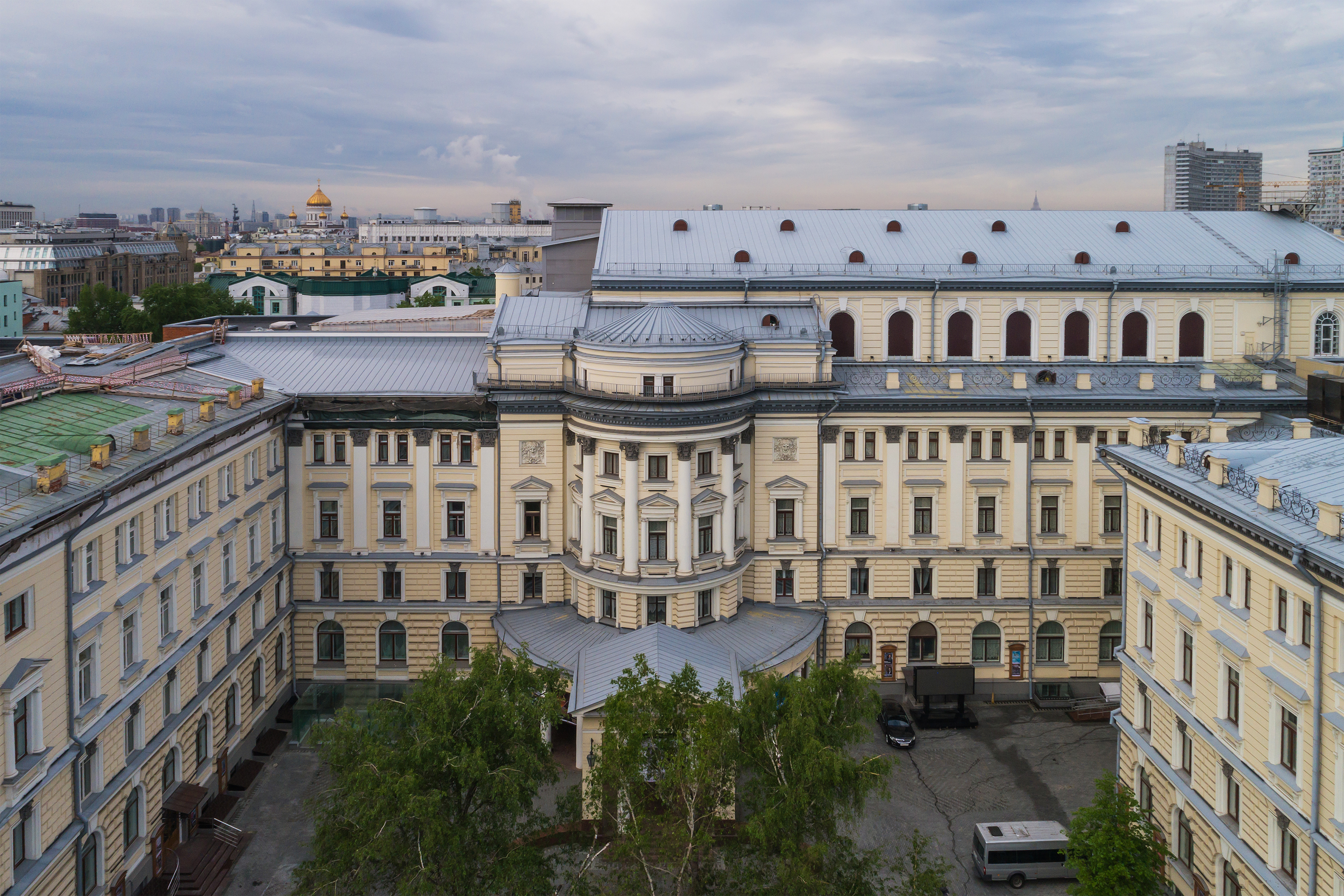
- The Great Hall, the main performance auditorium
- Established: 1866; 160 years ago
- Rector: Prof. Alexander Sergeyevich Sokolov
- Address: 13, Bolshaya Nikitskaya Street, Moscow, 125009
- Location: Moscow
- Interactive map of Moscow State Tchaikovsky Conservatory
- Website: http://www.mosconsv.ru

The Moscow Conservatory, also officially Tchaikovsky Moscow State Conservatory (Russian: Московская государственная консерватория им. П. И. Чайковского, romanized: Moskovskaya gosudarstvennaya konservatoriya im. P. I. Chaykovskogo) is a higher musical educational institution located in Moscow, Russia. It grants undergraduate and graduate degrees in musical performance and musical research. The conservatory offers various degrees including Bachelor of Music Performance, Master of Music and PhD in research.

== History ==
=== Background ===
In 1766, the future site of the conservatory was bought by Princess Ekaterina Romanovna Dashkova (1743-1810), later president of the Russian Academy of Sciences and the Russian Academy. The building was completed in the 1790s. Its author was Vasily Bazhenov, the design of the building was corrected by the hostess herself. Toward the end of her life, she spent winters here.

In 1810, the building was inherited by her nephew, Count Mikhail Semyonovich Vorontsov, a future war hero, participant in the Battle of Borodino, then governor of Novorossiya and Bessarabia, governor of the Caucasus. He was renting out the house. The house burned in 1812, rebuilt by 1824.

=== Establishment of a conservatory ===
The idea of establishing a conservatory in Moscow was first suggested in 1819 by Friedrich Scholz, Kapellmeister of the Bolshoi Theater, but the idea was not supported. Eleven years later, in 1830, he managed to get permission to open at his home "free teaching of figured bass and composition". In 1860, Nikolai Rubinstein, together with Vasily Kologrivov, organized in Moscow musical classes of the Moscow branch of the Imperial Russian Musical Society. Rubinstein's co-founder was Prince Nikolai Petrovitch Troubetzkoy, chairman of the Moscow branch of the Russian Musical Society (1863-1876). Initially, the music classes were held in Rubinstein's apartment (who lived on Sadovaya Street, in Volotsky's house). First of all, classes in choral singing (Konstantin Albrecht) and elementary music theory (Eduard Langer, then Nikolai Rubinstein and Nikolay Kashkin) were organized. Since the fall of 1863, most of the classes moved to the new address of Rubinstein's residence (Myasnoy alley, house of Burkin). Solo singing (Bertha Walzek and Adolf Osberg) and playing various instruments began to be taught: violin (Karl Klamroth and Vasily Bezekirsky), piano (Nikolai Rubinstein, Eduard Langer and Nikolay Kashkin), cello (Karl Ezef), flute (Ferdinand Büchner), trumpet (Fyodor Richter). In 1864 the number of pupils exceeded two hundred, and the Russian Musical Society rented Voeikova's house on Mokhovaya Street, where Rubinstein's apartment was located. In 1866, teachers Ludwig Minkus (violin), Józef Wieniawski and Anton Door (piano), and Pyotr Ilyich Tchaikovsky (elementary music theory) joined.

In 1862, a conservatory was established in Saint Petersburg, and there was a need for a higher musical institution in Moscow. The report of the Russian Musical Society for 1863/1864 already mentioned a concert organized "for the benefit of the conservatory to be opened in Moscow"

Conservatory in Moscow was co-founded in 1866 as the Moscow Imperial Conservatory by Nikolai Rubinstein and Prince Nikolai Troubetzkoy. The grand opening was held on 1 September. It is the second oldest conservatory in Russia after the Saint Petersburg Conservatory. Pyotr Ilyich Tchaikovsky was appointed professor of theory and harmony at its opening. Since 1940, the centenary of his birth, the conservatory has borne his name.

=== Conservatory ===
The highest permission for the opening of the Moscow Conservatory, at the request of the August Patroness of the Society, Grand Duchess Elena Pavlovna, followed on 24 December 1865. Pianist N.G. Rubinstein was approved as its director on 6 February 1866. Konstantin Albrecht was appointed inspector of the conservatory. By the day of the opening of the Conservatory a house was rented at the corner of Vozdvizhenka and the Arbatskie Gates passage, in the house of Baroness Cherkasova. The house has not survived; in 1941, during an air raid on Moscow, the building was destroyed by a bomb. In 1871 the Moscow Conservatory rented Dashkova's house, and in 1878 bought it for 185 thousand rubles.

The Conservatory was financed by the income of the Russian Musical Society from concert activities, as well as city and government subsidies, donations from private individuals and tuition fees. The course of study at the conservatory took six years until 1879, then was increased to nine years. It covered both music classes (instrumental, vocal, orchestral, choral, opera, and theory) and general education. Until 1917, tuition was paid.

In the early years of the Conservatory, the level of requirements for admission to the Conservatory was by necessity very low. Only those who had studied earlier in the Music Society classes had some theoretical training. All others were required to begin music theory with an elementary course, in which everyone was enrolled regardless of proficiency in any instrument, mainly piano. In the first school year of 1866/1867, the professorial (senior) classes had 38 pupils on the piano; the junior classes (adjunct classes) had 43. In May 1867, general examinations were held, on the basis of which the students were assigned to courses.

In the early years of its activity the Conservatory was taught by professors: piano - Nikolai Rubinstein, Józef Wieniawski, C. F. Wilshau (adjunct), Anton Door, C. E. Weber (adjunct), Alexandre Dubuque, A. K. Zander (adjunct), Karl Klindworth (from 1868), Nikolay Kashkin, E. L. Langer (adjunct), L. F. Langer (from 1869), Nikolai Zverev (junior piano classes from 1870); solo singing - A. D. Alexandrova-Kochetova, B. O. Walzek, Vladimir Kashperov, A. R. Osberg, J. Galvani (from 1869); violin - Ferdinand Laub, Ludwig Minkus, Jan Hřímalý (from 1869 - adjunct, from 1874 - professor), G. Shradik (adjunct); cello - B. Kosman, Wilhelm Fitzenhagen (from 1870); double bass - G. F. Spekin; flute - F. F. Büchner; oboe - E. F. Meder; clarinet - W. Guth; French horn - M. Barthold, trumpet - F. B. Richter, bassoon - K. F. Ezer; history and theory of church singing in Russia - D. V. Razumovsky; music-theoretical subjects - Konstantin Albrecht, N. A. Hubert, Nikolay Kashkin, E. L. Langer, Herman Laroche, A. S. Razmadze; elementary music theory and harmony - Pyotr Ilyich Tchaikovsky (since 1870 - instrumentation and free composition).

In 1899 the Italian singer, composer and teacher U. A. Masetti was invited, who raised solo singing to the highest level, creatively combining the best of the Italian and Russian schools.

The building rented for the conservatory soon became insufficient due to the ever-increasing number of students. In the summer of 1877, Prince M. S. Vorontsov's house on Nikitskaya Street was finally acquired by the Moscow branch of the Russian Musical Society. This building met the educational needs of the Conservatory for fifteen years, but by the end of this period it had become cramped again, as the number of students had increased considerably (in the 1868-1869 school year there were 184 students, and in 1893-1894 there were already 430). In addition, the need for its own concert hall began to be felt. However, the old building was mortgaged to the Moscow City Credit Society, and a number of proposals were considered for the purchase of various plots of land in Moscow for construction. On 27 November 1893 it was decided to build a conservatory designed by academician of architecture V. P. Zagorsky on the site of Prince Vorontsov's house. In 1894, after the transfer of the Conservatory to temporary hired premises in the house of Prince Golitsyn on Volkhonka, the dismantling of the old building began, and on 27 June 1895 the solemn laying of the new building of the Conservatory took place. In 1898 the Conservatory already began its classes in new classrooms, and on October 25 of the same year the Small Hall was consecrated and opened. Works on the arrangement and decoration of the Great Hall were finished only by 1901, and on 7 April 1901 the grand opening of the hall took place. (Note: Nicholas II allocated 100 thousand rubles for the completion of the Great Hall of the Conservatory at the request of his uncle, Konstantin Konstantinovich, who wrote to him: "...it would be a great happiness for the Russian Musical Society if, in memory of the days you spent in the ancient capital, a generous favor were granted to the Moscow Conservatory; the fact is that the construction of her new building on B. Nikitskaya is nearing completion and another 120,000 rubles are needed for the decoration of a large concert hall. This amount is so large that I hesitate to ask for its allocation from the State Treasury...")

In 1932-1933, the three-storey building was built on the project of I. Y. Bondarenko. In 1983, the building of the Synodal School of Church Singing (former Kolychevy House, in the style of classicism, built in the late 18th century by an unknown architect of the school M. F. Kazakov; since 1925 it housed the law faculty of Moscow State University) was added to the conservatory, which was granted the status of the third academic building of the conservatory.

During the Soviet period, the Sunday Working Conservatory (1927-1933) and the Music Work Faculty (1929-1935) were organized to prepare the children of workers and peasants for admission to the Moscow Conservatory. For the admission of representatives of the Union republics extra-competitive (target) places were allocated annually. In 1931-1932, solving the «task of proletarianisation», Narkompros decided to rename the Moscow Conservatory into «Feliks Kon Higher Music School». In these years, attempts were made to simplify the curricula, «to bring them into agreement with the Marxist method». In late 1932, the former name and academic profile of the institution were restored.

In 1935, the Military Conductor's Faculty was established on the basis of the Military Kapellmeister's Department of the Conservatory. As of 22 June 1941, there were 30 students in the military faculty. In the 2000s, this faculty was transferred from the subordination of the Moscow Conservatory to the subordination of the Military Academy of the General Staff of the Armed Forces of Russia, and then to the Military University of the Ministry of Defense of the Russian Federation.

On 7 May 1940, by the decree of the Presidium of the Supreme Soviet of the USSR, the Moscow Conservatory was named after P. I. Tchaikovsky and scholarships named after P. I. Tchaikovsky were established for especially gifted students of the Faculty of Composition.

In 1954 a monument to Pyotr Ilyich Tchaikovsky was unveiled in front of the Great Hall of the Conservatory.

On 18 March 1958 the First International Tchaikovsky Competition was opened at the Conservatory. Until 2019, in the years of this competition, the Conservatory's curricula were cut by one month for the comfortable preparation of participants and jury members: usually the main wave of the summer session took place from May 20 to the end of June, but in the years of the competition - from the end of April to June 5.

== Choral faculty ==
Prior to the October Revolution, the choral faculty of the conservatory was second to the Moscow Synodal School and Moscow Synodal Choir, but in 1919, both were closed and merged into the choral faculty. Some of the students now listed as being of the conservatory were in fact students of the Synodal School.

== Halls ==
- Great Hall (a renovation of the hall was completed in 2011)
- Small Hall
- Rachmaninov Hall (built in 1890)
- Conference Hall
- N.Y. Myaskovsky Concert Hall
- The Oval and Exhibition Halls at the Rubinstein Museum

== Notable alumni ==
- Maria Abajan (born 1950) – soprano
- Valery Afanassiev (b. 1947) – pianist
- Nelly Akopian-Tamarina – pianist
- Ashot Ariyan (b. 1973) – composer and pianist
- Eduard Artemyev (1937–2022) – composer
- Vladimir Ashkenazy (b. 1937) – pianist, conductor
- Vladimir Bakaleinikov (1885–1953) – violist, composer, conductor
- Stanisław Barcewicz (1858-1929) – violinist
- Rudolf Barshai (1924–2010) – violist, conductor
- Dmitri Bashkirov (1931–2021) – pianist
- Yuri Bashmet (b. 1953) – violist, conductor
- Boris Berezovsky (b. 1969) – pianist
- Boris Berman (b. 1948) – pianist
- Lazar Berman (1930–2005) – pianist
- Pavel Berman (b. 1970) – violinist, conductor
- Vadim Borisovsky (1900–1972) – violist
- Anatoliy Brandukov (1859–1930) – cellist
- Alexander Chuhaldin (1892–1951) – violinist, conductor, composer
- Tish Daija (1926–2003) – Albanian composer
- Đặng Thái Sơn (b. 1958) – pianist
- Bella Davidovich (b. 1928) – pianist
- Nikolai Demidenko (b. 1955) – pianist
- Edison Denisov (1929–1996) – composer
- Vladimir Denissenkov (b. 1956) – accordionist
- Fyodor Druzhinin (1932–2007) – violist
- Youri Egorov (1954–1988) – pianist
- Samuil Feinberg (1890–1962) – pianist, composer
- Frank Fernandez (b. 1944) – pianist, composer
- Yakov Flier (1912–1977) – pianist
- Andrei Gavrilov (b. 1955) – pianist
- Misha Geller (1937–2007) – composer, violist
- Emil Gilels (1916–1985) – pianist
- Marina Goglidze-Mdivani (b. 1936) – pianist
- Alexei Gorokhov (1927–1999) – violinist, musicologist
- Vera Gornostayeva (1929–2015) – pianist
- Sofia Gubaidulina (b. 1931) – composer
- Maria Grinberg (1908–1978) – pianist
- Natalia Gutman (b. 1942) – cellist
- Rustem Hayroudinoff – pianist
- Andrej Hoteev (1946–2021) – pianist
- Waleed Howrani (b. 1948) – composer, pianist
- Rinat Ibragimov (1960–2020) – double bassist, conductor
- Valentina Igoshina (b. 1978) – pianist
- Konstantin Igumnov (1873–1948) – pianist
- Ilya Itin (b. 1967) – pianist
- Dmitry Kabalevsky (1904-1987) – composer, pianist
- Nikolai Kapustin (1937-2020) – composer, pianist
- Olga Kern (b. 1975) – pianist
- Aram Khachaturian (1903-1978) – composer
- Rina Kharrasova – pianist
- Savvas Savva (b. 1957) – composer, pianist
- Yuri Kholopov (1932-2003) – musicologist
- Natalia Khoma (1963-present) - cellist
- Vladimir Khomyakov (b. 1984) – pianist
- Tikhon Khrennikov (1913-2007) – composer
- Igor Khudolei (1940-2001) – pianist
- Olga Kiun – pianist
- Pavel Klinichev – conductor
- Leonid Kogan (1924-1982) – violinist
- Pavel Kogan (b. 1952) – violinist, conductor
- Evgeni Koroliov (b. 1949) – pianist
- Sergey Kostiuchenko (b. 1965) – Belarusian conductor
- Ivan Kotov (1950–1985) – bassist
- Maxim Kozlov (active 1995–present) – cellist and educator
- Vladimir Krainev (1944–2011) – pianist
- Gidon Kremer (b. 1947) – violinist
- Eduard Kunz (b. 1980) – pianist
- Ina Lange (1846–1930) – pianist; later music historian and writer
- Elisabeth Leonskaja – pianist
- Josef Lhévinne – pianist
- Rosina Lhévinne – pianist
- Dong-Hyek Lim – pianist
- Alexei Lubimov – pianist
- Nikolai Lugansky – pianist
- Radu Lupu – pianist
- Anna Saulowna Lyuboshits – cellist
- Dmitry Malikov – pianist, composer, singer
- Anna Malikova – pianist
- Yevgeny Malinin – pianist
- Alexander Malofeev – pianist
- Álvaro Manzano (1955–2022) - Ecuadorian conductor
- Emanuil Manolov – pianist, flutist, conductor, composer
- Fuat Mansurov – conductor
- Denis Matsuev – pianist
- Nikolai Medtner – composer, pianist
- Victor Merzhanov – pianist
- Alexander Mogilevsky – violinist
- Roman Moiseyev – conductor
- Alexander Mosolov – pianist, composer
- Avni Mula – Albanian singer, composer
- Shoista Mullodzhanova – Shashmaqam singer
- Viktoria Mullova – violinist
- Sergey Musaelyan – pianist
- Alexandre Naoumenko – singer
- Anahit Nersesyan – pianist
- Heinrich Neuhaus – pianist
- Stanislav Neuhaus – pianist
- Tatiana Nikolayeva – pianist
- Dmitri Novgorodsky – pianist
- Lev Oborin – pianist
- David Oistrakh – violinist
- Alexander Osminin − pianist
- Aleksandra Pakhmutova – composer
- Dmitry Paperno – pianist
- Georgs Pelēcis – Latvian composer and musicologist
- Nikolai Petrov (1943-2011) – pianist
- Gregor Piatigorsky – cellist
- Mikhail Pletnev – pianist, composer, conductor
- Ivo Pogorelić – pianist
- Viktoria Postnikova – pianist
- Mikhail Press – violinist
- Sergei Rachmaninoff – pianist, composer
- Sviatoslav Richter – pianist
- Mstislav Rostropovich – cellist and conductor
- Gennady Rozhdestvensky – conductor
- Nikolai Sachenko (b. 1977) – violinist
- Dilorom Saidaminova (b. 1943) - Uzbek composer
- Aram Satian – composer
- Alexander Scriabin – composer and pianist
- Rodion Shchedrin – composer and pianist
- Alfred Schnittke – composer
- Dmitry Shishkin (b. 1992) - pianist
- Leonid Sigal – violinist
- Valery Sigalevitch – pianist
- Alexander Siloti (1863–1945) – pianist, conductor, composer
- Tamriko Siprashvili – pianist
- Pyotr Slovtsov – tenor
- Galina Konstantinovna Smirnova - composer
- Viviana Sofronitsky – pianist
- Aleksandr Sokolov – Russian Minister of Culture
- Alexei Soutchkov – pianist
- Vladimir Spivakov – violinist, conductor
- Steven Spooner – pianist
- Mykola Suk – pianist
- Yevgeny Svetlanov – conductor, pianist, composer
- Ivan Tasovac – pianist
- Marina Tchebourkina – organist, musicologist
- Viktor Tretiakov – violinist
- Anna Tsybuleva – pianist
- Ibrahim Tukiqi – Albanian singer
- Pava Turtygina - composer, pianist
- Mauricio Vallina – pianist
- Saša Večtomov – cellist
- Alexander Veprik – composer
- Anastasia Vedyakova - violinist and composer
- Eliso Virsaladze – pianist
- Oleg Volkov – pianist
- Mikhail Voskresensky – pianist
- Jacob Weinberg – pianist and composer
- Çesk Zadeja – Albanian composer
- Marina Yakhlakova – pianist
- Irina Zaritskaya – pianist
- Igor Zubkovsky – cellist

== Notable faculty ==
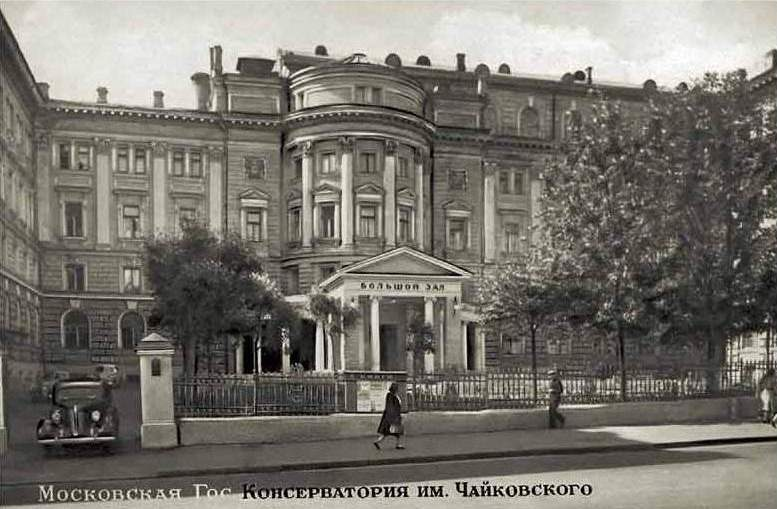
The Moscow Conservatory in 1940

- Yuri Bashmet – viola
- Andrei Diev – piano
- Natalia Gutman – cello
- Alexei Lubimov – piano and historical keyboards
- Valery Popov – bassoon
- Kirill Rodin – cello
- Yuri Slesarev – piano
- Eliso Virsaladze – piano
- Irina Zhurina – voice

== Conservatory directors and rectors ==
No.	Years	Rector
1	1866—1881	Nikolai Grigoryevich Rubinstein
2	1881—1883	Nikolai Albertovich Hubert
3	1883—1885	Konstantin Karlovich Albrecht
4	1885—1889	Sergey Ivanovich Taneyev
5	1889—1906	Vasily Ilyich Safonov
6	1906—1922	Mikhail Mikhailovich Ippolitov-Ivanov
7	1922—1924	Aleksandr Borisovich Goldenweiser
8	1924—1929	Konstantin Nikolayevich Igumnov
9	1929—1932	Boleslaw Stanislavovich Przybyszewski
10	1932—1934	Stanislav Teofilovich Shatsky
11	1935—1937	Heinrich Gustav Neuhaus
12	1937—1939	Valentina Nikolayevna Shatskaya
13	1939—1942	Aleksander Borisovich Goldenweiser
14	1942—1948	Vissarion Yakovlevich Shebalin
15	1948—1974	Alexander Vasilyevich Sveshnikov
16	1974—1990	Boris Ivanovich Kulikov
17	1991—2000	Mikhail Alekseevich Ovchinnikov
18	2001—2004	Aleksandr Sergeyevich Sokolov
19	2004—2005	Vladimir Vladimirovich Sukhanov
20	2005―2009	Tigran Abramovich Alikhanov
21	since 2009	Aleksandr Sergeyevich Sokolov

== Conservatory structure ==
At present, the Conservatory has the following faculties:

- vocal
- conducting (Choral and Opera and Symphony Conducting Departments)
- compositional
- orchestral
- piano
- historical and contemporary performing arts
- a number of interfaculty departments

The conservatory consists of:

- S. I. Taneyev Scientific and Musical Library (one of the largest music libraries in the Russian Federation)
- Sound recording laboratory ("phonotheque", since 1947)
- Scientific and Publishing Center "Moscow Conservatory"
- N.G. Rubinstein Museum
- opera studio
- postgraduate studies, assistantships and doctoral studies
- Training and methodological center of practices with evening music school
- Information and Computing Center

Scientific subdivisions (institutes) of the Conservatory:

- Problem research laboratory
- Church Music Research Center
- Scientific Center of Folk Music named after Klyment Kvitka
- Research Center for the Methodology of Historical Musicology
- Scientific and Creative Center for Contemporary Music
- Scientific and Creative Center "Musical Cultures of the World"

The Conservatory's staff consists of about 500 faculty members, 1,500 undergraduate and graduate students, and 500 technical and administrative staff.
