= Heinrich Neuhaus =

Soviet pianist (1888–1964)

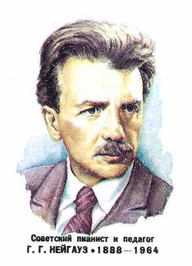
- Heinrich Neuhaus, 1962
- Born: Heinrich Gustav Neuhaus; 12 April 1888; Yelisavetgrad, Russian Empire
- Died: 10 October 1964 (aged 76); Moscow, Russian SFSR, Soviet Union
- Occupations: Pianist; musical pedagogue

Heinrich Gustav Neuhaus (Polish: Henryk (Henry) Neuhaus; Russian: Ге́нрих Густа́вович Нейга́уз, romanized: Genrikh Gustavovich Neygauz; 12 April [O.S. 31 March] 1888 – 10 October 1964) was a Russian and Soviet pianist and teacher. Part of a musical dynasty, he was of German descent. He taught at the Moscow Conservatory from 1922 to 1964. Neuhaus was also awarded the People's Artist of the RSFSR (1956).

His piano textbook The Art of Piano Playing (1958) is regarded as one of the most authoritative and widely used approaches to the subject.

== Life and career ==
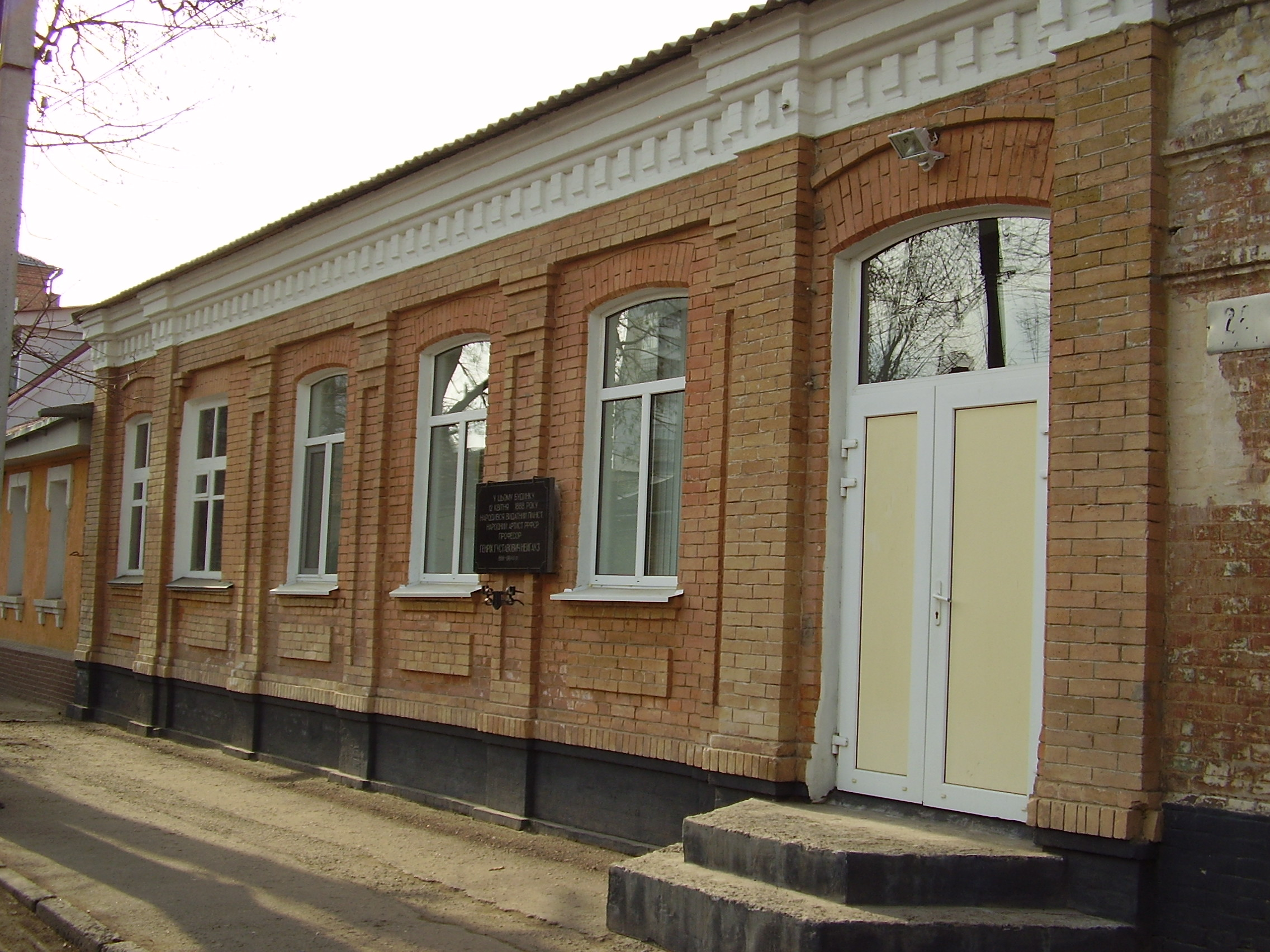
The house where Heinrich Neuhaus was born in Kropyvnytskyi (formerly Yelisavetgrad)

Neuhaus was born in Yelisavetgrad, Russian Empire (present-day Kropyvnytskyi, Ukraine). He was brought up in a Polish-speaking household, and was of German descent. Although both his parents were piano teachers, he was largely self-taught. A major influence on his early artistic development came from Karol Szymanowski, his neighbour and cousin through his mother, Olga, "Marta" née Blumenfeld. Szymanowski himself was tutored by Heinrich's father, Gustav Neuhaus. Another strong influence was his uncle, Felix Blumenfeld on the latter's visits to his sister's home in the locality. He also received lessons from Aleksander Michałowski. At the age of eleven, Neuhaus made his first public appearance, performing an impromptu and some waltzes by Frédéric Chopin. In 1902 he gave a recital in Yelisavetgrad with the 11-year-old Mischa Elman and in 1904 gave concerts in Dortmund, Bonn, Cologne and Berlin. Subsequently, he studied with Leopold Godowsky in Berlin and from 1909 until the outbreak of World War I took part in his master classes at the Vienna Academy of Music.

In 1912, Neuhaus attended a concert in Berlin in which Arthur Rubinstein premiered Szymanowski's Piano Sonata No. 2, and left a suicide note saying that the concert had made clear to him that he would never be successful as a composer or a pianist and that he could not go on living, and was going to Florence in Italy to die. Szymanowski and Rubinstein hastily followed Neuhaus to Florence and tracked him down to a hospital, where he was safe and recovering after cutting his wrist in a hotel.

In 1914, Neuhaus started teaching in Yelisavetgrad and later Tiflis and Kiev, where he befriended Vladimir Horowitz. After a temporary paralysis, Neuhaus was forced to halt his concert career and turned to teaching instead. In 1922 he began teaching at the Moscow Conservatory where he helped to create the famous Moscow Central Music School for gifted children in 1932. In addition, he also served as director of the Moscow Conservatory between 1934 and 1937. When Nazi Germany approached Moscow in 1941, he was imprisoned on suspicion of being a German spy, but released eight months later under pressure from Dmitri Shostakovich, Emil Gilels and others. His pupils there included Sviatoslav Richter, Emil Gilels, Yakov Zak, Lev Naumov, Vera Gornostayeva, Eliso Virsaladze, Radu Lupu, Margarita Fyodorova, Victor Eresko, Anatoly Vedernikov, Tikhon Khrennikov, Galina Melikhova, Yevgeny Malinin, Alexander Edelmann, Tamara Guseva, Ryszard Bakst, Teodor Gutman, Alexander Slobodyanik, Nathan Perelman, Leonid Brumberg, Igor Zhukov, Oleg Boshniakovich, Anton Ginsburg, Valery Kastelsky, Gérard Frémy, Zdeněk Hnát, Alexei Lubimov, Aleksey Nasedkin, Vladimir Krainev, Maria Kardas, Berta Maranz, Evgeny Mogilevsky, Amalya Baiburtyan, Valentina Kameníková, Victor Derevianko, Vera Razumovskaya, Nina Svetlanova, Boris Petrushansky and Yuri Krechkovsky.

Neuhaus died in Moscow on 10 October 1964.

== Legacy ==
Neuhaus was renowned for the poetic magnetism of his playing and for his artistic refinement. He was a lifelong friend of Boris Pasternak, and Osip Mandelstam expressed his admiration for Neuhaus's playing in a poem. Neuhaus was father-in-law to Soviet mathematician Victor Lidskii. Stanislav Neuhaus, Heinrich's son by his first wife Zinaida, who later married Pasternak in 1931, was also a noted pianist. Stanislav Bunin is his grandson.

== Works ==
- Neuhaus, Heinrich (1998). The Art of Piano Playing. London: Kahn & Averill. ISBN 1-871-08245-5.
