= Porvoo =

City in Uusimaa, Finland

Porvoo Porvoo – Borgå
- City
- Porvoon kaupunki Borgå stad
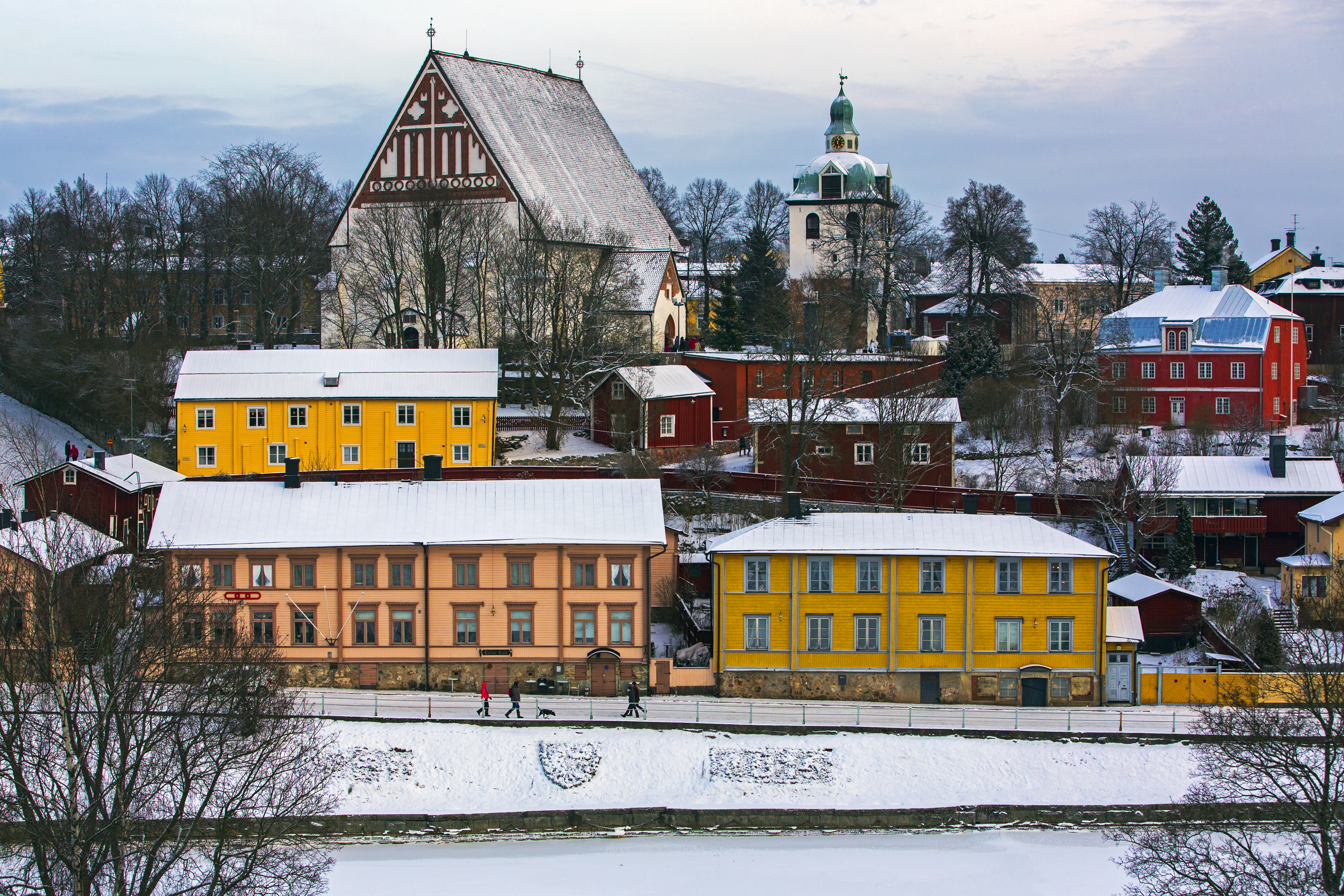
- A view of buildings in the Porvoo Old Town, including the Porvoo Cathedral

- Coat of arms

- Interactive map of Porvoo
- Coordinates: 60°23′40″N 25°39′50″E
- Country: Finland
- Region: Uusimaa
- Sub-region: Porvoo
- City rights: 1347 or c. 1380

Government
  - City manager: Jani Pitkäniemi

Area (2018-01-01)
  - Total: 2,139.81 km^{2} (826.19 sq mi)
  - Land: 654.56 km^{2} (252.73 sq mi)
  - Water: 1,484.49 km^{2} (573.16 sq mi)
  - Rank: 131st largest in Finland

Population (2025-12-31)
  - Total: 51,863
  - Rank: 19th largest in Finland
  - Density: 79.23/km^{2} (205.2/sq mi)

Population by native language
  - Finnish: 63.1% (official)
  - Swedish: 27.2% (official)
  - Others: 9.7%

Population by age
  - 0 to 14: 16.7%
  - 15 to 64: 61.5%
  - 65 or older: 21.8%
- Time zone: UTC+02:00 (EET)
  - Summer (DST): UTC+03:00 (EEST)
- Climate: Dfb
- Website: www.porvoo.fi/en/

Porvoo (Finnish pronunciation: [ˈporʋoː]; Swedish: Borgå [ˈborɡo]; Latin: Borgoa) is a city in Finland. It is located on the south coast of the country, on the Gulf of Finland. Porvoo lies in the eastern part of the Uusimaa region. The population of Porvoo is approximately 52,000, while the sub-region has a population of approximately 60,000. It is the 19th most populous municipality in Finland, and the 15th most populous urban area in the country.

Porvoo is located on the southern coast of Finland, approximately 35 kilometres (22 mi) east of the city border of Helsinki and about 50 kilometres (30 mi) from the city centre. Porvoo was one of the six medieval towns of Finland, along with Turku, Ulvila, Rauma, Naantali and Vyborg, and is first mentioned as a city in texts from the 14th century. Porvoo is the seat of the Swedish-speaking Diocese of Borgå of the Evangelical Lutheran Church of Finland. Porvoo briefly served as the capital of the former Eastern Uusimaa region.

Porvoo is a bilingual municipality with Finnish and Swedish as its official languages. The population consists of 63% Finnish speakers, 27% Swedish speakers, and 10% speakers of other languages. The municipalities neighbouring Porvoo are Askola, Loviisa, Myrskylä, Pornainen, and Sipoo; and the sub-region maintained by Porvoo includes Askola, Myrskylä and Pukkila.

Porvoo Old Town (Finnish: Porvoon vanhakaupunki; Swedish: Borgå gamla stan) is a popular tourist destination, known for its well-preserved 18th- and 19th-century buildings, and the 15th-century Porvoo Cathedral. The Old Town and the Porvoonjoki River Valley are recognized as, together, one of the National landscapes of Finland. In December 2025, Radio Nostalgia voters chose Porvoo as the "most beautiful Christmas town in Finland".

== Etymology ==
The town received its name from a Swedish medieval fortress near the river Porvoonjoki, which flows through the town. The name Porvoo is the Fennicised version of the Swedish name Borgå, which is derived from borg, meaning "castle" and å, "river".

== Heraldry ==
The coat of arms of Porvoo, based on the medieval seal of the city, is "Azure [blue], a tulip-shaped letter C argent [silver]." The main object in the arms has been interpreted as either a fire iron or the letter C, referring to the Latin word for "castle" (Latin: castrum). A version of the arms redrawn by Gustaf von Numers was approved for official use by the Porvoo City Council on March 23, 1960, and the Ministry of the Interior confirmed the use of the coat of arms on June 1 the same year.

== History ==
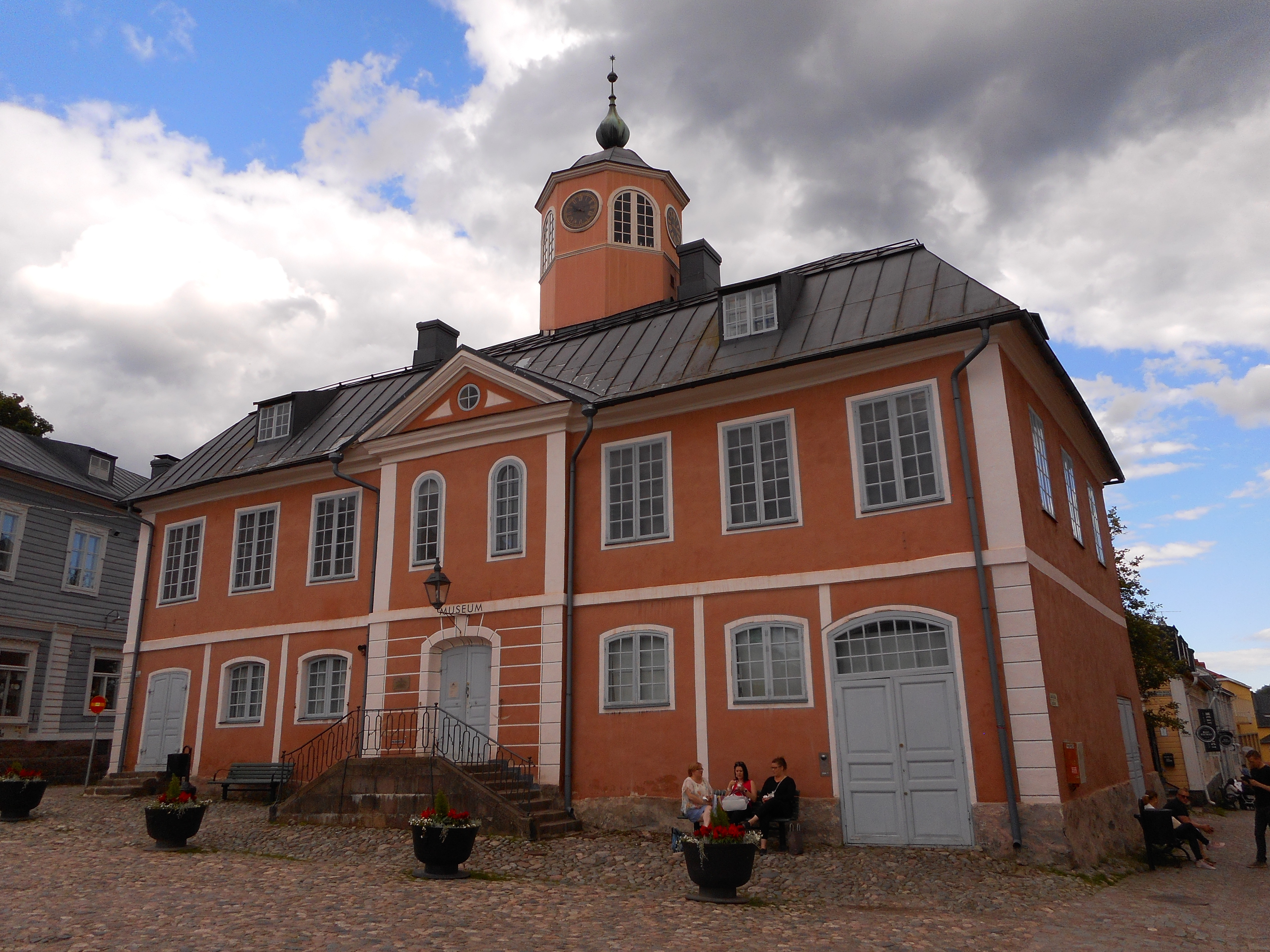
The old Porvoo Town Hall, which now serves as a museum

The area of Porvoo has been inhabited since the Stone Age. In prehistoric times, the river Porvoonjoki was a route of commerce for Finnish tribal Tavastians who primarily inhabited the inland regions. The Tavastians also had some permanent settlements in the area, such as the village of Hattula (later Strömsberg), which was named after an inland Tavastian village. The original name of the river Porvoonjoki was possibly Kukinjoki. The name derives from the name of the trade vessel cog which was a common merchant ship in the Baltic Sea in medieval times. The early center of the area was Saksala, meaning "the place of the Germans", and deriving from the merchants who were trading in Saksala.

Porvoo was colonised by Swedes in the 13th and 14th centuries after the so-called Second Crusade against Tavastians in 1249–1250. The colonisation was led by the Catholic Church and the kingdom of Sweden. The colonists originated from Svealand, and were provided with seeds, cattle and, tax exemption for four years.

The oldest known written mentions of Porvoo are from the early 14th century. In circa 1380, Porvoo became the third town in Finland to be granted official town rights, after Turku in 1229 and Ulvila in 1365. However, it is also claimed to have been founded as early as 1347, which would make it the second oldest after Turku. Due to land rise and loss of shipping access, Ulvila lost town rights to nearby Pori in 1558.

When Sweden lost the city of Vyborg to Russia in 1721, the episcopal see was moved to Porvoo in 1723. At this time, Porvoo was the second largest city in Finland.

In 1760, roughly two-thirds of all buildings in Porvoo burned to the ground in a conflagration. During rebuilding, the city planning wasn't altered, instead new buildings were built upon the existing medieval foundations.

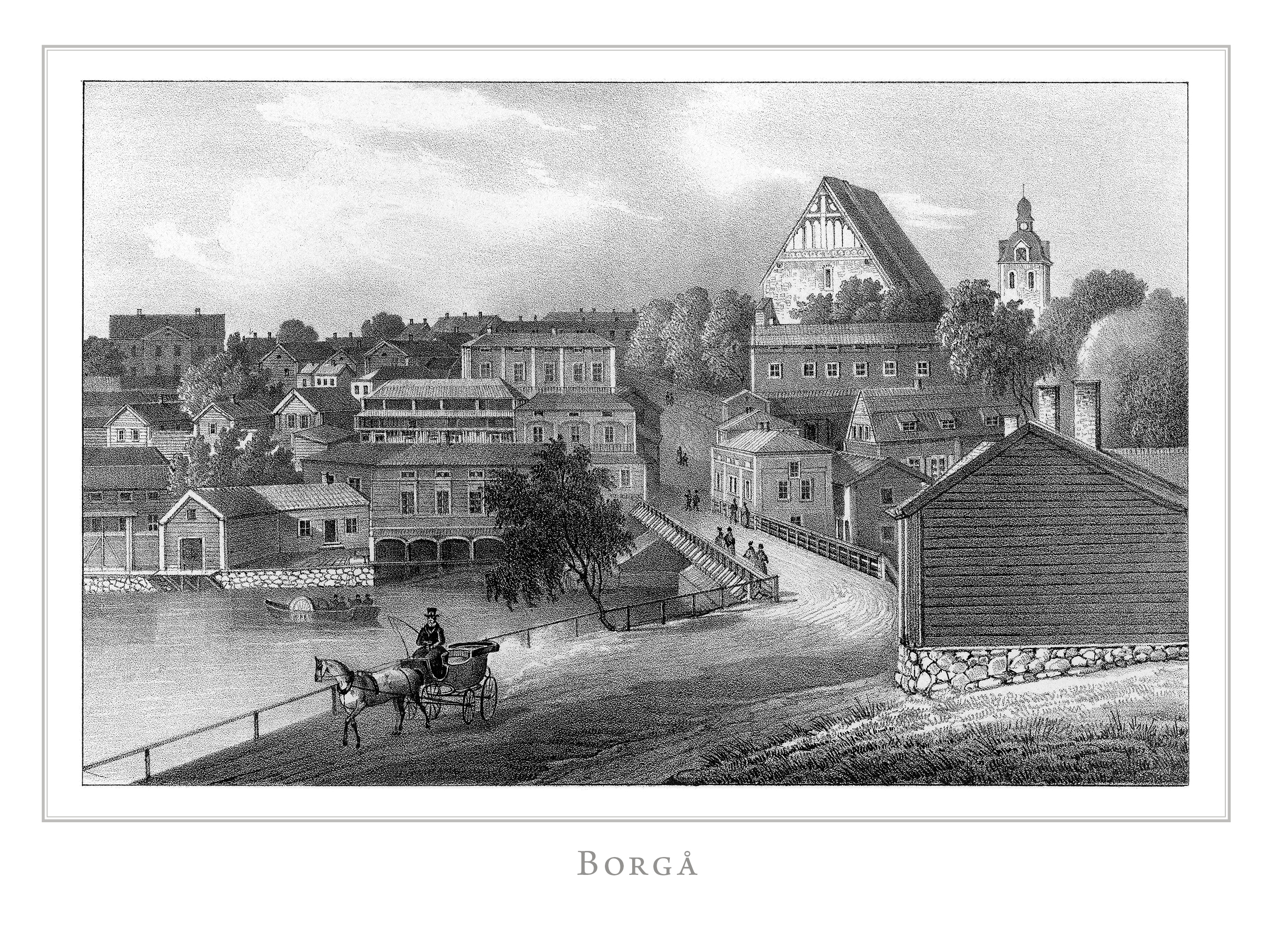
Illustration of Borgå in Finland framstäldt i teckningar edited by Zacharias Topelius and published 1845-1852.

After the conquest of Finland by Russian armies in 1808, Sweden had to cede Finland to Russia in 1809 (the Treaty of Fredrikshamn). The Diet of Porvoo in 1809 was a landmark in the History of Finland as tsar Alexander I made Finland an autonomous Grand Duchy. In 1923, six years after Finland's independence, the former Diocese of Vyborg, which operated in Porvoo, was replaced by a current Swedish-speaking diocese of the Evangelical Lutheran Church of Finland, the Diocese of Porvoo.

The Porvoo Common Statement is a report issued at the conclusion of theological conversations by official representatives of four Anglican churches and eight Nordic and Baltic Lutheran churches in 1989–1992. It established the Porvoo Communion, so named after the Porvoo Cathedral where the Eucharist was celebrated on the final Sunday of the conversations leading to the Statement.

The old city of Porvoo was formally disestablished and the new city of Porvoo founded in 1997, when the city of Porvoo and the rural municipality of Porvoo were consolidated.

== Urban development ==
=== Old Town ===
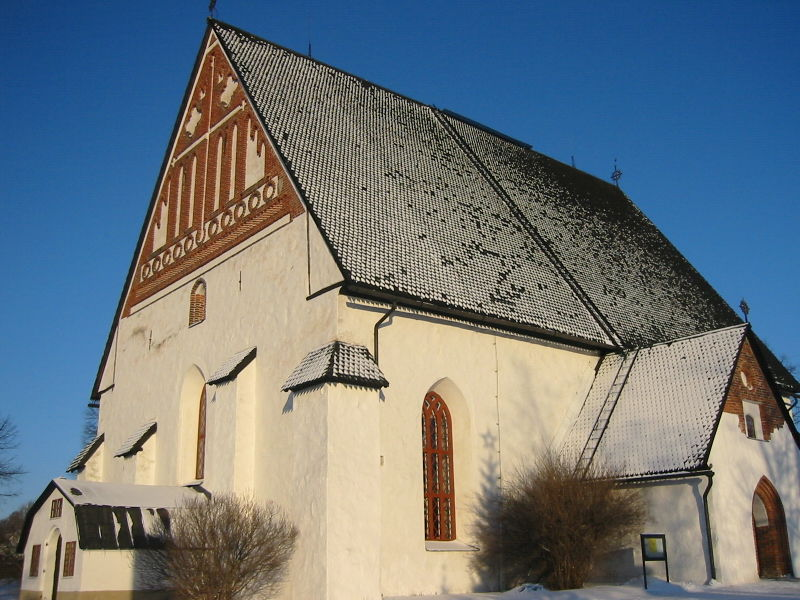
The Porvoo Cathedral prior to the fire in May 2006

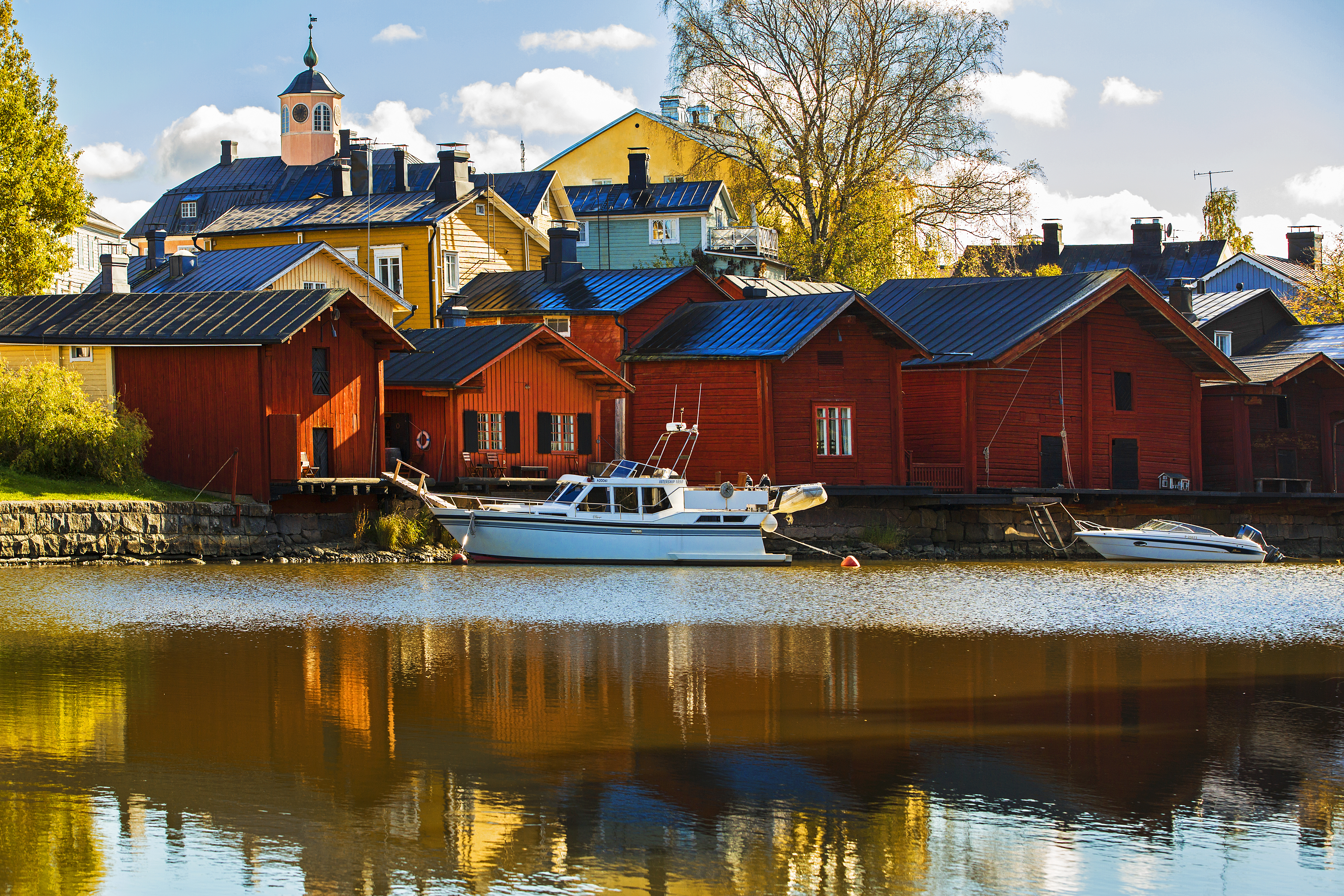
Old wooden warehouses alongside the Porvoo River is one of the famous sights of town.

The town is famed for its "Old Town" (Vanhakaupunki in Finnish, Gamla Stan in Swedish), a dense medieval street pattern with predominantly wooden houses from the 17th and 18th centuries. The Old Town came close to being demolished in the 19th century by a new urban plan for the city, but the plan was canceled due to a popular resistance headed by Count Louis Sparre. With the need for growth, a plan was envisioned for a new town built adjacent to the Old Town, following a grid plan, but with houses also built of wood. Jokikatu (located eastside of the Porvoonjoki River) is one of Porvoo's pedestrian streets, and like the other similar streets of the Old Town, it also includes a variety of restaurants, coffeehouses, antique shops and other stores.

The central point of the old town is the medieval, stone and brick Porvoo Cathedral. The cathedral gave its name to the Porvoo Communion, an inter-church agreement between a number of Anglican and Lutheran denominations. The cathedral is reminiscent of similarly aged churches across Finland, such as the Church of St. Lawrence, Vantaa, as they were designed by the same person, the anonymous German architect Pernajan mestari. The Diocese of Borgå that unites the Swedish speaking lutheran congregations, resides here. The cathedral has burned down 5 times. The latest fire happened on 29 May 2006; the roof was totally destroyed but the interior is largely intact. A drunken youth had started a fire at the church, unaware of recent tar work and nearby tar containers, accidentally causing a large conflagration. He was later sentenced to a short prison term and restitutions of 4.3 million euro.

The Old Town is a significant source of tourism in the area. Visitors to the capital Helsinki can embark on day trips to visit the older city. The Old Town also hosts various events, such as an annual Christmas market.

=== Later developments ===
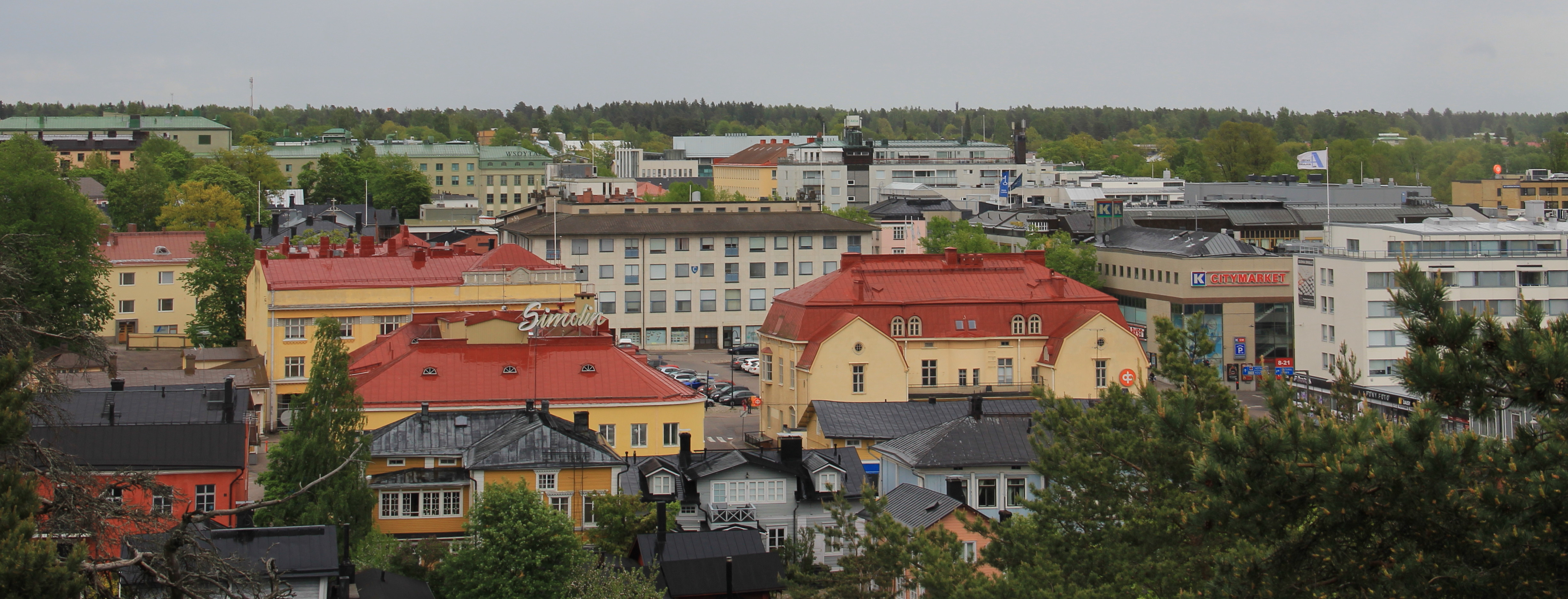
A modern city view of Porvoo

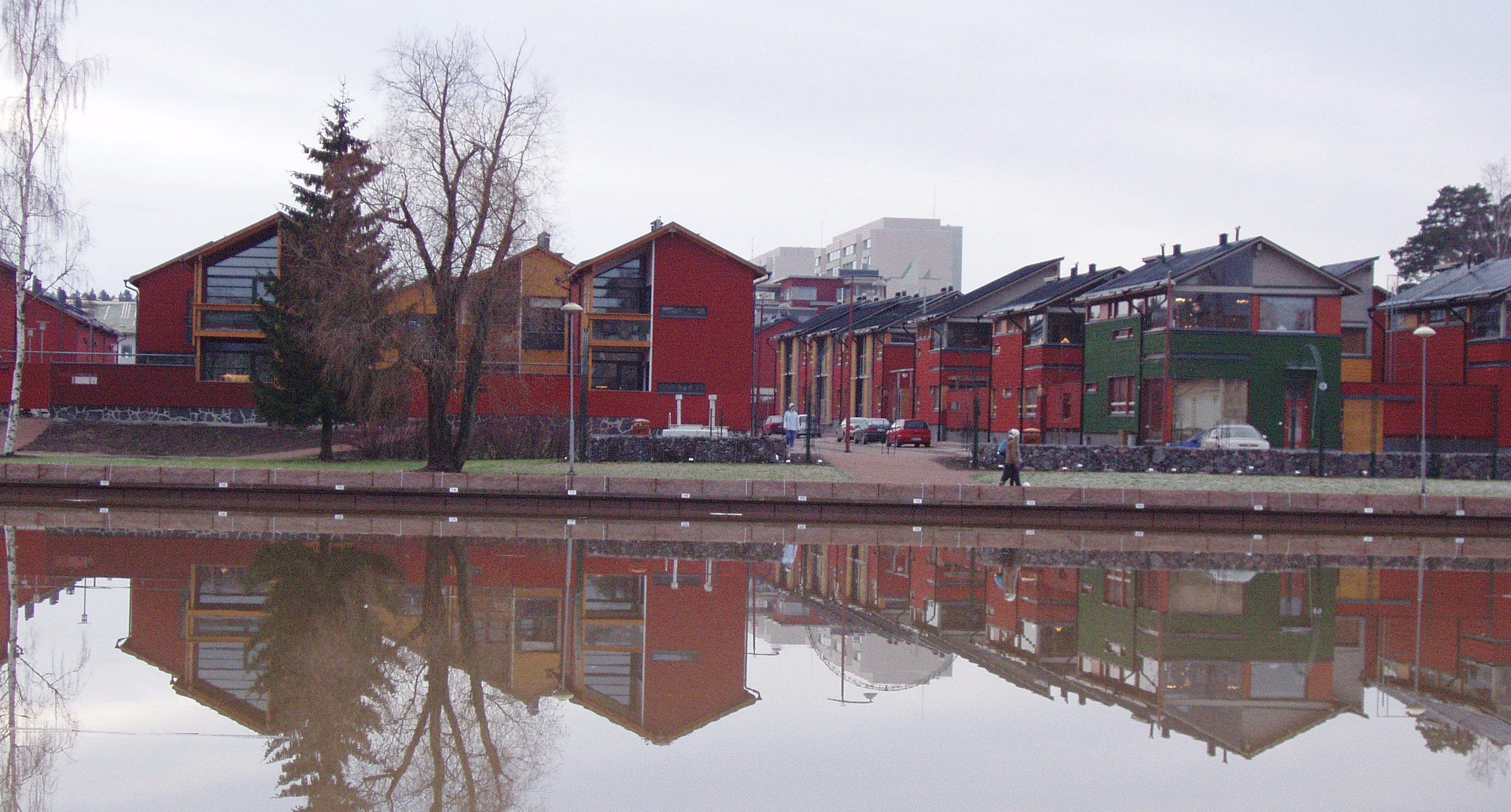
New housing designed to match older storage buildings across the river

By the end of the 20th century, there was pressure to develop the essentially untouched western side of the river. There was concern that growth would necessitate the construction of a second bridge across the river into the town, thus putting further strain on the aging wooden town. An architectural competition was held in 1990, the winning entry of which proposed building the second bridge. Plans for the western side of the river have progressed under the direction of architect Tuomas Siitonen, and both a vehicle bridge and a pedestrian bridge have been built. The design for new housing is based on a typology derived from the old storehouses on the opposite side of the river. Yet another new development entails the construction of a large business park called King's Gate (Finnish: Kuninkaanportti, Swedish: Kungsporten), which is under construction.

The Porvoo railway station does not have a regular train service, but special museum trains from Kerava (either with steam locomotives or former VR diesel railcars from the 1950s) operate on summer weekends.

The new hotel called Runo Hotel was opened in the old town of Porvoo on May 31, 2021.

=== Subdivisions ===
==== Districts ====
Hornhattula, Joonaanmäki (Jonasbacken), Jernböle, Kaupunginhaka (Stadshagen), Keskusta (Centrum), Etelä-Kevätkumpu (Södra Vårberga), Pohjois-Kevätkumpu (Norra Vårberga), Myllymäki (Kvarnbacken), Näsi (Näse), Pappilanmäki (Prästgårdsbacken), Skaftkärr, Suistola, Vanha Porvoo (Gamla Borgå).

==== Suburbs ====
Hamari (Hammars), Aunela (Ånäs), Eestinmäki (Estbacka), Gammelbacka, Huhtinen (Huktis), Katajamäki (Ensbacka), Kevätkumpu (Vårberga), Kokonniemi (Uddas), Kuninkaanportti (Kungsporten), Pappilanpelto (Prästgårdsåkern), Peippola (Pepot), Tarkkinen (Tarkis), Tarmola (Östermalm).

=== Villages ===
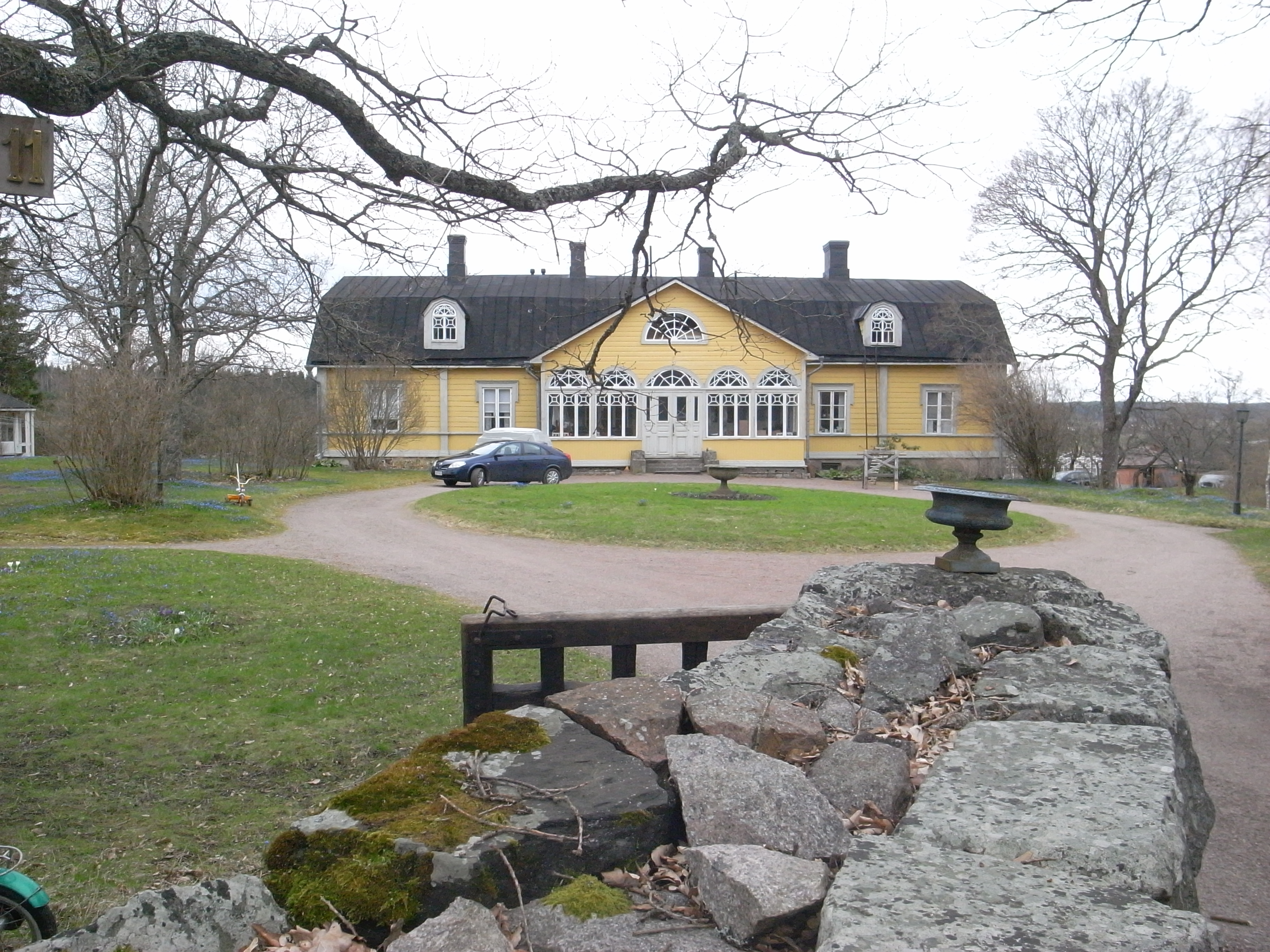
Jackarby Manor in the Jakari village

==== Suomenkylä ====
Suomenkylä (Swedish: Finnby) is a village north of the centre of Porvoo and beside the Porvoo river. Suomenkylä has an old school founded by Johannes Linnankoski in 1898. The village of Suomenkylä also has two burial places from the Bronze Age.

==== Kerkkoo ====
Kerkkoo (Swedish: Kerko) is a village north of the centre of Porvoo and beside the Porvoo river. It has an active school that is over 100 years old. In the village of Kerkkoo, archeologists and townspeople found a stone axe from the Bronze Age.

==== Other ====
Ali-Vekkoski (Söderveckoski), Anttila (Andersböle), Baggböle, Bengtsby (Pentinkylä), Bjurböle, Boe (Häihä), Bosgård, Brattnäs, Eerola (Eriksdal), Eestinmäki (Estbacka), Emäsalo (Emsalö), Epoo (Ebbo), Fagersta, Gammelbacka, Grännäs, Gäddrag, Haikkoo (Haiko), Henttala, Hinthaara (Hindhår), Hommanäs, Huhtinen, Hummelsund, Ilola (Illby), Jakari (Jackarby), Järnböle, Kaarenkylä (Karsby), Kalax (Kaalahti), Kallola, Kardrag, Karleby (Kaarlenkylä), Kiiala (Kiala), Kilpilahti (Sköldvik), Klemetti (Klemetsby), Kortisbacka, Kreppelby, Kroksnäs, Kråkö, Kulloo (Kullo), Kurböle, Kuris, Londböle, Mickelsböle, Munkkala (Munkby), Mustijoki (Svartså), Myllykylä (Molnby), Norike, Nygård, Onas, Orrby (Orrenkylä), Pappilanmäki (Prästgårdsbacken), Peippola (Pepot), Pellinki (Pellinge), Piirlahti (Pirlax), Ramsholmen, Renum, Saksala (Saxby), Sannainen (Sannäs), Seitlahti (Seitlax), Sikilä (Siggböle), Skavarböle, Sondby, Stensböle, Sundö (Suni), Svartbäck, Tamminiemi (Eknäs), Tarkkinen (Tarkis), Teissala (Teisala), Tolkkinen (Tolkis), Tirmo (Tirmoo), Treksilä (Drägsby), Tuorila (Torasbacka), Tyysteri (Tjusterby), Vaarlahti (Varlax), Vanhamoisio (Gammelgård), Veckjärvi (Vekjärvi), Virtaala (Strömsberg), Virvik, Voolahti (Vålax), Västermunkby, Ylike, Yli-Vekkoski (Norrveckoski), Åby, Åminsby.

== Climate ==
Climate data for Porvoo Harabacka (1991-2020 normals, extremes 1959-2005 in Jernböle, 10/2006-present in Harabacka)
Month	Jan	Feb	Mar	Apr	May	Jun	Jul	Aug	Sep	Oct	Nov	Dec	Year
Record high °C (°F)	8.1 (46.6)	9.8 (49.6)	16.1 (61.0)	24.0 (75.2)	29.5 (85.1)	32.0 (89.6)	33.1 (91.6)	31.7 (89.1)	27.7 (81.9)	18.8 (65.8)	14.1 (57.4)	10.4 (50.7)	33.1 (91.6)
Mean maximum °C (°F)	4.3 (39.7)	4.6 (40.3)	9.4 (48.9)	17.9 (64.2)	24.7 (76.5)	26.8 (80.2)	28.5 (83.3)	27.0 (80.6)	21.6 (70.9)	14.8 (58.6)	9.3 (48.7)	5.4 (41.7)	29.6 (85.3)
Mean daily maximum °C (°F)	−1.9 (28.6)	−1.8 (28.8)	2.5 (36.5)	9.1 (48.4)	15.9 (60.6)	20.0 (68.0)	22.9 (73.2)	21.2 (70.2)	15.7 (60.3)	8.7 (47.7)	3.5 (38.3)	0.3 (32.5)	9.7 (49.4)
Daily mean °C (°F)	−4.4 (24.1)	−5.0 (23.0)	−1.6 (29.1)	4.2 (39.6)	10.5 (50.9)	15.1 (59.2)	18.1 (64.6)	16.4 (61.5)	11.4 (52.5)	5.7 (42.3)	1.4 (34.5)	−1.9 (28.6)	5.8 (42.5)
Mean daily minimum °C (°F)	−7.5 (18.5)	−8.2 (17.2)	−5.2 (22.6)	−0.4 (31.3)	4.5 (40.1)	9.6 (49.3)	12.7 (54.9)	11.3 (52.3)	7.1 (44.8)	2.5 (36.5)	−1.2 (29.8)	−4.7 (23.5)	1.7 (35.1)
Mean minimum °C (°F)	−21.4 (−6.5)	−21.3 (−6.3)	−16.2 (2.8)	−7.4 (18.7)	−2.6 (27.3)	2.9 (37.2)	7.2 (45.0)	4.9 (40.8)	−0.5 (31.1)	−6.4 (20.5)	−10.6 (12.9)	−16.7 (1.9)	−25.3 (−13.5)
Record low °C (°F)	−38.0 (−36.4)	−38.0 (−36.4)	−33.0 (−27.4)	−22.0 (−7.6)	−7.3 (18.9)	−2.0 (28.4)	1.8 (35.2)	−3.0 (26.6)	−7.6 (18.3)	−16.5 (2.3)	−25.5 (−13.9)	−34.9 (−30.8)	−38.0 (−36.4)
Average precipitation mm (inches)	55 (2.2)	43 (1.7)	35 (1.4)	35 (1.4)	40 (1.6)	70 (2.8)	65 (2.6)	75 (3.0)	63 (2.5)	70 (2.8)	75 (3.0)	61 (2.4)	685 (27.0)
Average precipitation days (≥ 1.0 mm)	12	10	8	7	7	9	8	10	9	11	12	12	115
Source 1: FMI normals 1991-2020
Source 2: Record highs and lows 1959- present

== Demographics ==
=== Population ===
Historical population
Year	Pop.	±% p.a.
1815	2,223	—
1850	2,950	+0.81%
1870	3,478	+0.83%
1890	4,214	+0.96%
1910	5,466	+1.31%
1920	6,244	+1.34%
1930	6,821	+0.89%
1939	7,149	+0.52%
1972	34,445	+4.88%
1980	38,296	+1.33%
1990	41,930	+0.91%
2000	44,969	+0.70%
2010	48,768	+0.81%
2020	50,619	+0.37%
Source: Tilastollinen päätoimisto, Statistics Finland (1972-2020)

The city of Porvoo has 51,863 inhabitants, making it the 19th most populous municipality in Finland. The Porvoo region has a population of 59,952.

Population size 1990–2025
Year	Population
1990	41,930
1995	43,315
2000	44,969
2005	46,982
2010	48,768
2015	49,928
2020	50,619
2025	51,863

=== Languages ===
Population by
mother tongue (2025)
1. Finnish (63.1%)
2. Swedish (27.2%)
3. Russian (1.30%)
4. Estonian (1.20%)
5. Ukrainian (0.90%)
6. Arabic (0.80%)
7. Albanian (0.80%)
8. Other (4.70%)

The city of Porvoo is officially bilingual, with both Finnish and Swedish as official languages. The majority of the population, 32,727 persons (63.1%), spoke Finnish as their first language. The number of Swedish speakers was 14,091 persons (27.2%) of the population. Foreign languages were spoken by 9.7% of the population. As English and Swedish - or Finnish for Swedish speakers - are compulsory school subjects, functional bilingualism or trilingualism acquired through language studies is not uncommon.

At least 50 different languages are spoken in Porvoo. The most common foreign languages are Russian (1.3%), Estonian (1.2%), Ukrainian (0.9%) and Arabic (0.8%).

=== Immigration ===
Population by country of birth (2025)
Country of birth	Population	%
Finland	46,847	90.3
Soviet Union	659	1.3
Estonia	474	0.9
Sweden	355	0.7
Ukraine	269	0.5
Vietnam	221	0.4
Thailand	185	0.4
Russia	166	0.3
Yugoslavia	150	0.3
China	149	0.3
Other	1,926	3.7

As of 2024, there were 4,972 persons with a foreign background living in Porvoo, or 9% of the population. (Note: Statistics Finland classifies a person as having a "foreign background" if both parents or the only known parent were born abroad.) The number of residents who were born abroad was 4,840, or 9% of the population. The number of persons with foreign citizenship living in Porvoo was 3,299. Most foreign-born citizens came from the former Soviet Union, Estonia, Sweden, Vietnam and Ukraine.

The relative share of immigrants in Porvoo's population is slightly below the national average. Moreover, the city's new residents are increasingly of foreign origin. This will increase the proportion of foreign residents in the coming years.

=== Religion ===
In 2023, the Evangelical Lutheran Church was the largest religious group with 64.8% of the population of Porvoo. Other religious groups accounted for 2.2% of the population. 33.0% of the population had no religious affiliation.

== Economy ==
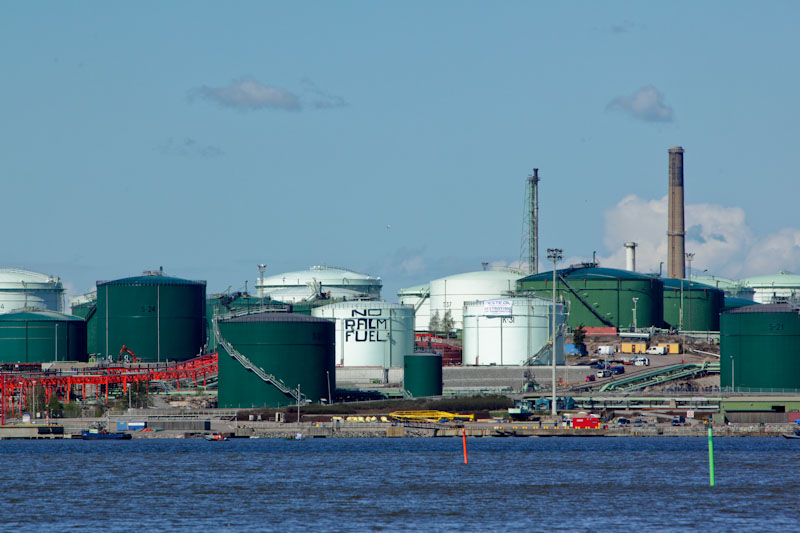
Neste Oil Porvoo refinery

In 2011, there were 20,312 jobs in Porvoo, distributed as follows: primary production 1.6 per cent, processing 32.5 per cent and services 64.7 per cent. In December 2012, the unemployment rate in Porvoo was 8.4 per cent, compared to an average of 10.7 per cent in the rest of the country. At that time, there were 3,389 business locations in the city. According to Statistics Finland, more companies were established in Porvoo in 2009–2013 than closed down, and the number of companies has increased by about 140 each year. According to the Eastern Uusimaa Viability Survey, in 2013 there were a few large companies and a few medium-sized companies in the Porvoo region, but the majority (86 per cent) were companies with less than five employees.

In 2014, the largest employers in Porvoo were Neste (2,000 jobs in Porvoo), Borealis Polymers (962), Ensto (430), Viessman Refrigeration Systems (414), Varuboden-Osla (300) and Bilfinger Industrial Services Finland (299).

The Satakuntaliitto's Satamittari measures the competitiveness of Finnish regions annually. In 2012, the Porvoo region ranked number one. In 2013, there were 70 sub-regions involved, which were assessed using six factors: labor productivity, employment rate, innovation, level of education, business dynamics and industrial dominance. The Porvoo region ranked fourth after Vaasa, Helsinki and Tampere. The region's labor productivity and industrial intensity were the highest in Finland, but the employment rate and level of education were also at the highest level.

== Sports ==
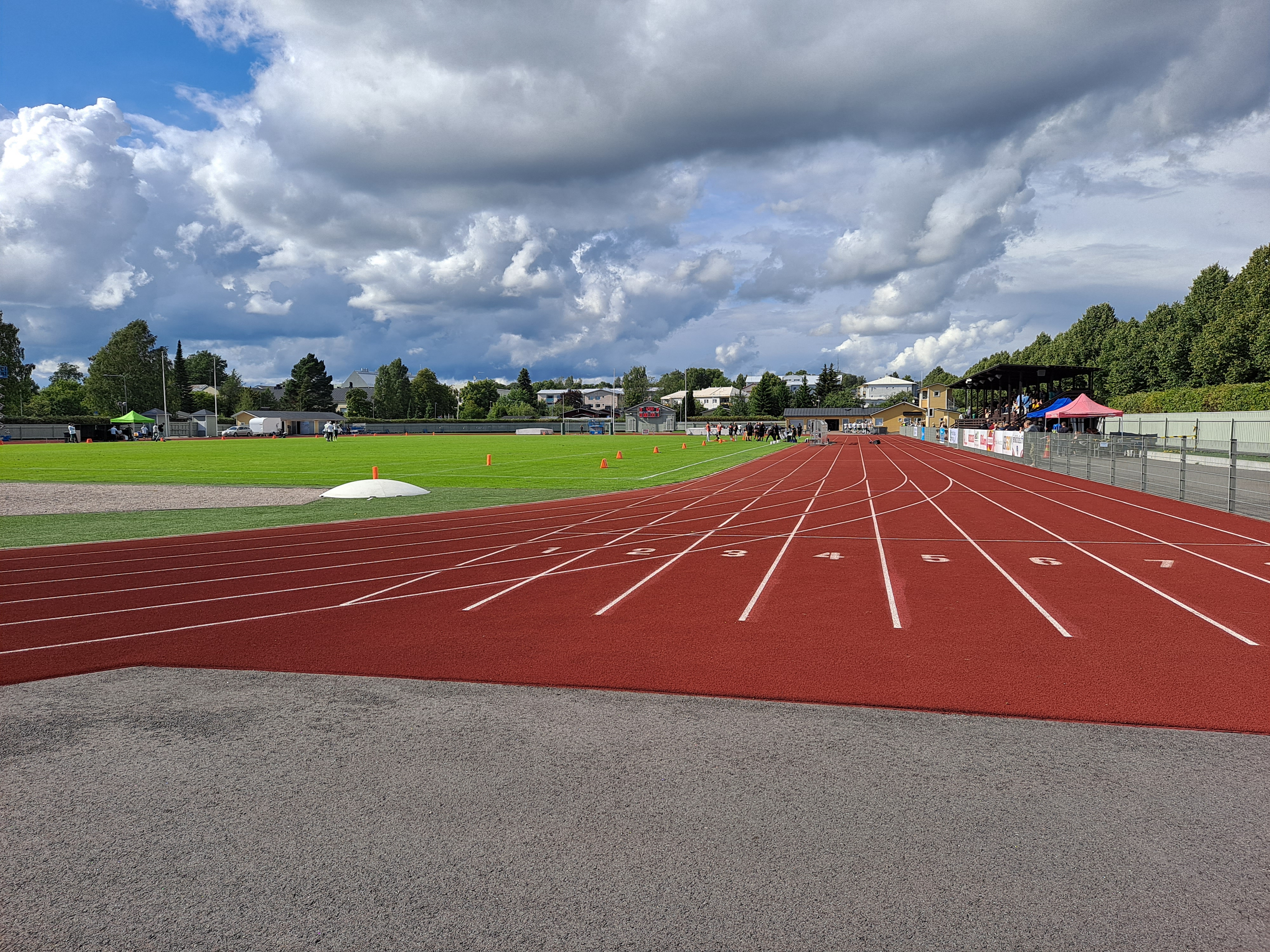
Porvoo Central Field, the home field of Porvoo Butchers

The local team Borgå Akilles plays the sport of bandy, in the highest division, Bandyliiga, and has become Finnish champions twice. The American football team Porvoo Butchers has been operating in Porvoo since 1986, and it is one of the most successful teams in Vaahteraliiga.

Sami Hyypiä, a former football player for Liverpool and the Finnish national team, originated from Porvoo.

Lauri Happonen, better known as Cyanide, a retired League of Legends professional player, is from Porvoo.

== Culture ==
=== Food ===
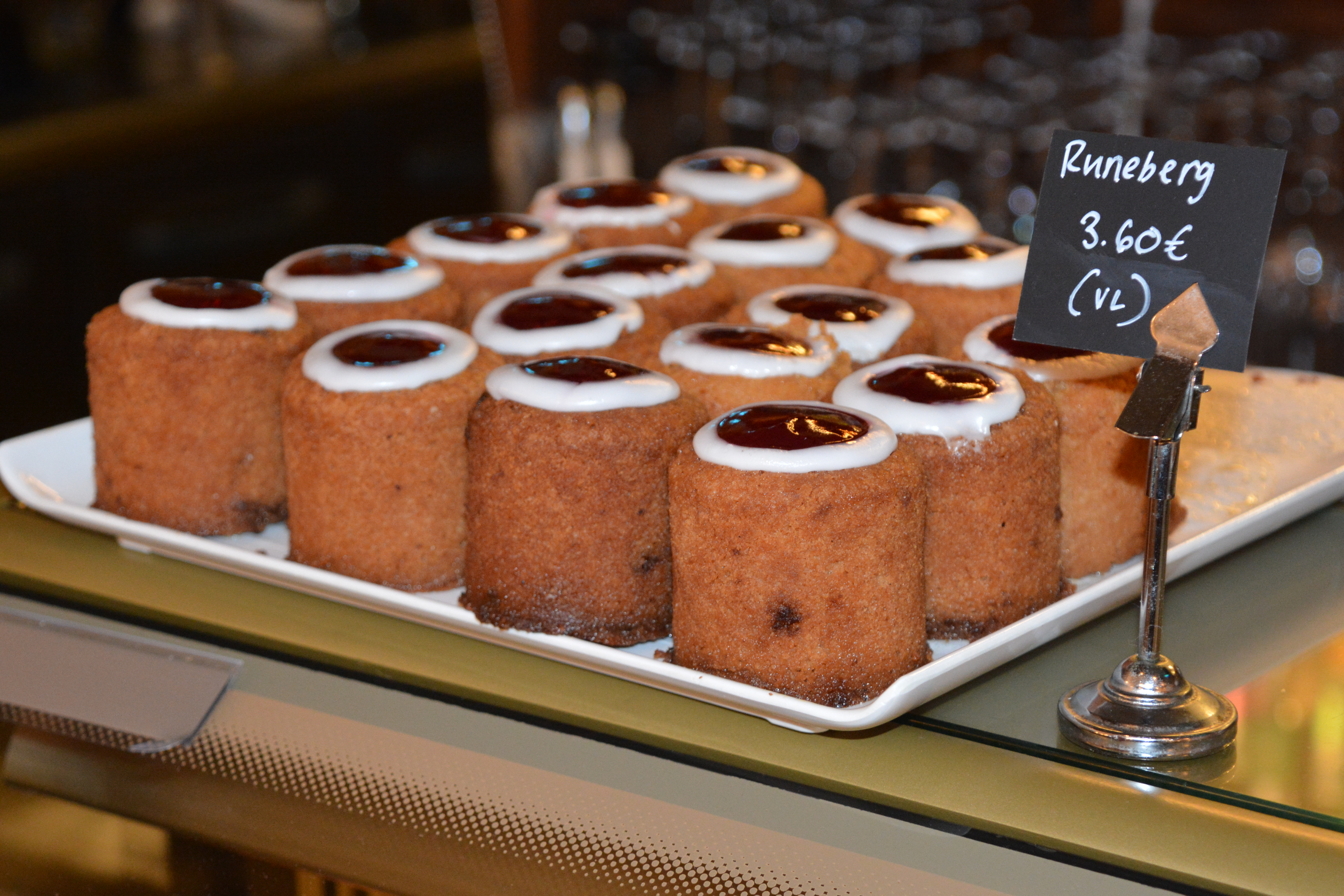
Runeberg tortes

A well-known Porvoo delicacy, a Runeberg torte, was developed by a local pastry master, and it is said that J. L. Runeberg ate them for breakfast. Fredrika Runeberg, the wife of the national poet also made tortes for her husband using the substances that happened to be found in the cupboards: wheat and breadcrumbs, biscuit crumbs, almonds, apple jam and sugar.

In addition to Runeberg torte, the second parish dish in Porvoo was grilled herring with onion rings and dill in the 1980s. Pellinki's fish soup and nettle soup were chosen as the main dishes of the Porvoo countryside.

Porvoo is also known for its local confectionery and ice cream factories, the most notable being the Brunberg Chocolate Factory and the Old Porvoo Ice Cream Factory (Vanhan Porvoon Jäätelötehdas).

=== Literature ===
J. L. Runeberg, today known as the "national poet of Finland", lived in Porvoo from 1837 until his death. His home has served as a museum since 1882.

Borgå Gymnasium in Porvoo is home to Finland's oldest public library from 1728. The oldest works in the library, which consists of rare works, are from the 15th century, and the collection includes, among other things, Mikael Agricola's original Se Wsi Testamenti from 1548. Today it functions as a museum library and is not open to the public.

Tove Jansson is said to have used the Söderskär Lighthouse, located on a small islet in the outer Porvoo archipelago, as a model when writing the lighthouse island of the book Moominpappa at Sea.

== Transport ==
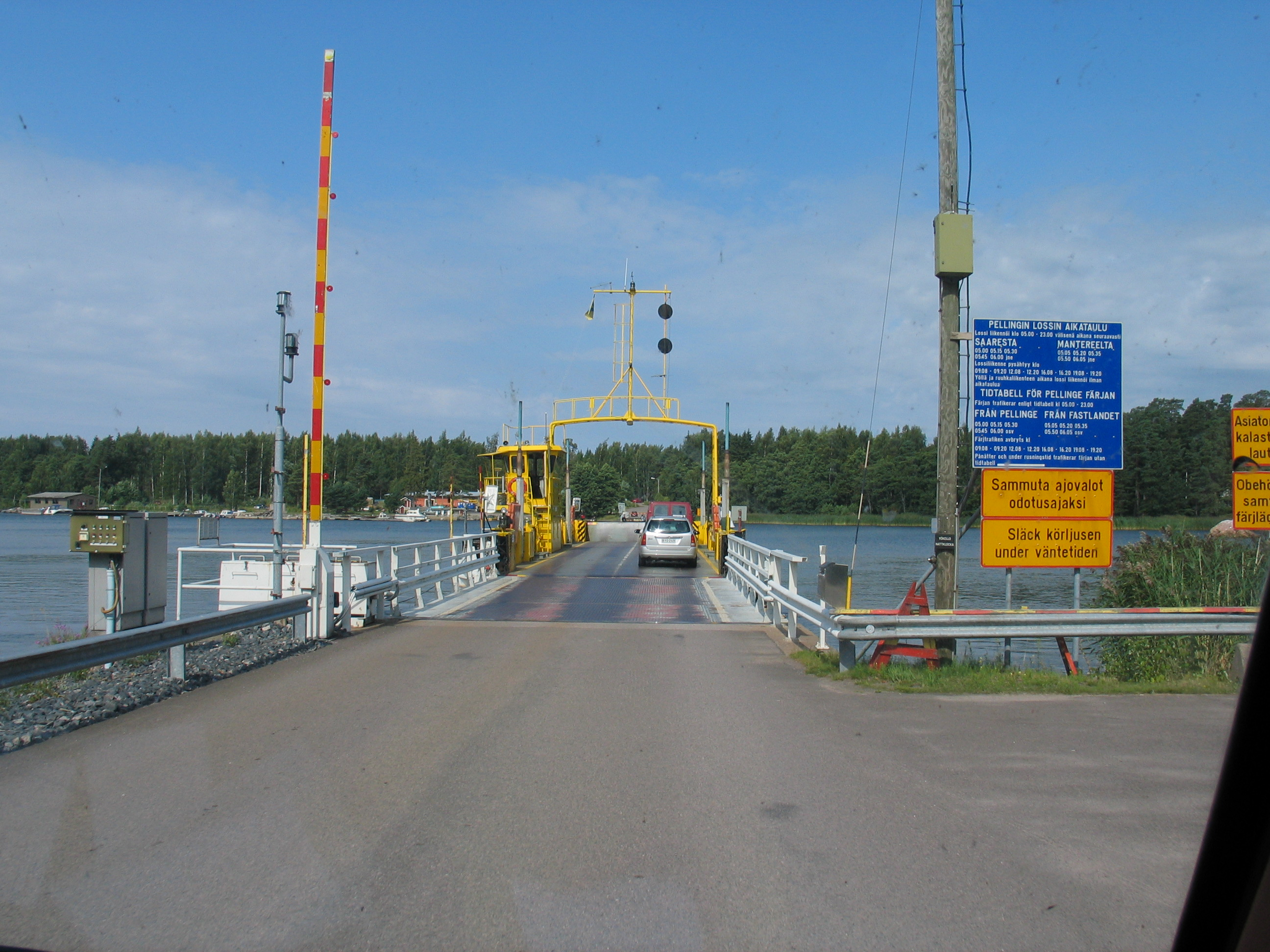
A ferry connection from Porvoo to the Pellinki Island

Porvoo is on the route of the E18 road from Helsinki to Saint Petersburg, and the Porvoo Highway (part of the Finnish national road 7) along that route is one of the most important transport connections to Helsinki. Other important road connections are the Finnish Regional road 170 going via Sipoo to Helsinki, which continues from the East Helsinki area to the capital under the name Itäväylä, and the main road 55 leading northwest, via Monninkylä of Askola, to the Mäntsälä municipality.

It is currently the largest Finnish municipality without scheduled railway services, since passenger rail services to Porvoo ended in 1981 and freight services in 1990, however proposals exist to link Porvoo to the rail network as part of a new rail line from Helsinki to Kouvola via a tunnel between Pasila and Helsinki Airport, the Itärata. There is no airport at all in Porvoo, but another airport in the Helsinki metropolitan area is planned for the Backas area, which would serve the traffic of cargo and small airlines.

Finland's biggest port by total cargo tonnage is the Port of Kilpilahti (Sköldvik) located on the outskirts of Porvoo. In Porvoo River, on the eastern bank of the river right in the city center, there is a guest marina. In the village of Hamari, there is also an opportunity for visiting boats to anchor in the breakwater. Also, the ferry connection favored by tourism runs between Helsinki and Porvoo on the MS J. L. Runeberg ferry.

== Politics ==
Results of the 2023 Finnish parliamentary election in Porvoo:

Party		Party	
Party		Votes	%
Swedish People's Party of Finland	SFP	7036	24.7%
Social Democratic Party of Finland	SDP	5605	19.7%
National Coalition Party	Kok	5202	18.3%
Finns Party	PS	4142	14.5%
Green League	Vihr	1496	5.2%
Left Alliance	Vas	1369	4.8%
Movement Now	Liik	1221	4.3%
Centre Party	Kesk	1054	3.7%
Christian Democrats	KD	709	2.5%
Freedom Alliance	VL	226	0.8%
Liberal Party – Freedom to Choose	Lib	125	0.4%
Animal Justice Party of Finland	EOP	63	0.2%
Crystal Party	KRIP	57	0.2%
Power Belongs to the People	VKK	55	0.2%
Blue-and-Black Movement	SML	54	0.2%
Pirate Party	Pir	24	0.1%
Feminist Party	FP	22	0.1%
Communist Party of Finland	SKP	17	0.1%
Finnish Reform Movement	KL	11	0.0%
Birgitta Johansson (Independent)		6	0.0%
Tomi Mäkinen (Independent)		4	0.0%
Kansalaisliitto	KAL	3	0.0%
Finnish People First	SKE	2	0.0%
Valid votes		28503	100.00%
Rejected votes		85	0.3%
Total polled		28588	100.0%

Results of the 2015 Finnish parliamentary election in Porvoo:

- Swedish People's Party: 27.3%
- Social Democratic Party: 16%
- National Coalition Party: 15.4%
- True Finns: 14.6%
- Centre Party: 10.9%
- Green League: 7.9%
- Left Alliance: 4.2%
- Christian Democrats: 1.8%

Distribution of the city council seats following the 2012 Finnish municipal elections:

- Swedish People's Party: 16
- Social Democratic Party: 12
- National Coalition Party: 9
- True Finns: 6
- Green League: 4
- Centre Party: 2
- Left Alliance: 1
- Christian Democrats: 1

== Notable people ==
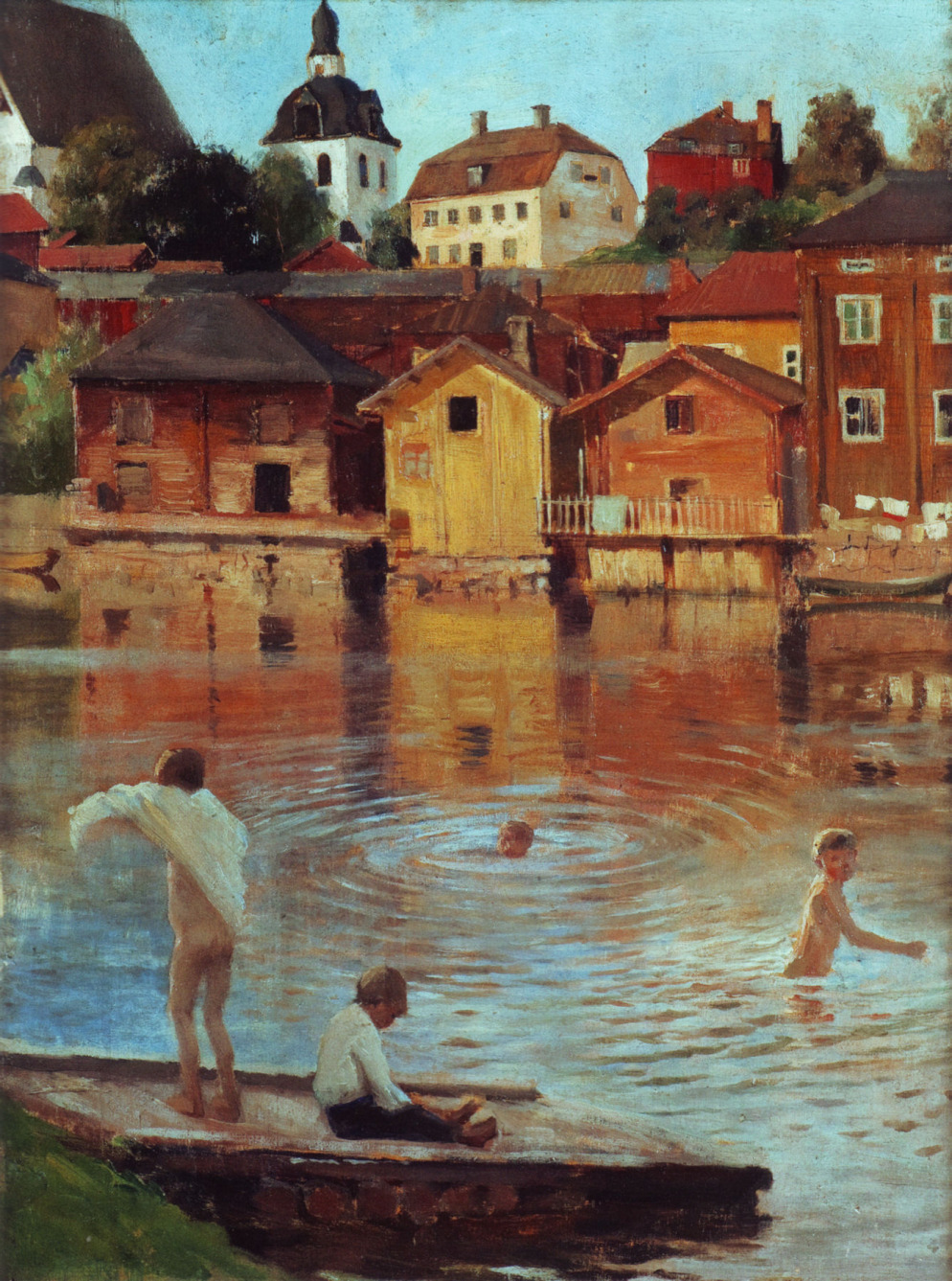
Boys Swimming in the Porvoo River by Albert Edelfelt, 1886

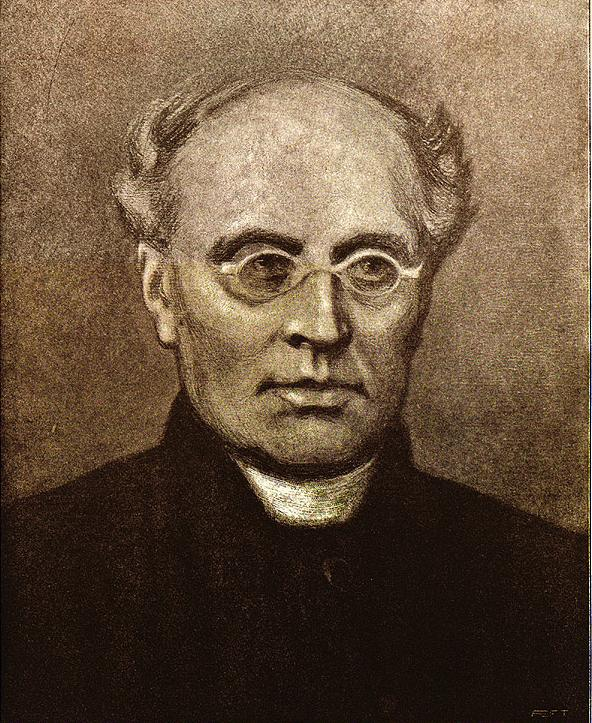
Johan Ludwig Runeberg, 1893

- Remu Aaltonen (born 1948), a Finnish drummer and singer.
- Carl Johan Adlercreutz (1757–1815), a Swedish (Finnish) general and statesman
- Johan Bäckman (born 1971), a Finnish political activist and legal sociologist
- Hjalmar Dahl (1891–1960), a Finnish-Swedish journalist, translator and author.
- Albert Edelfelt (1854–1905), a Finland-Swedish painter with a his naturalistic, Realist approach.
- Siri von Essen (1850–1912), a Swedish-speaking Finnish noblewoman and actress.
- Alva Forsius (1866–1935), social worker and midwife; established the town's first maternity home
- Tua Forsström (born 1947), a Finland-Swedish writer who writes in Swedish.
- Lauri Happonen (born 1993), stage name Cyanide, former League of Legends world champion.
- Klaus Härö (born 1971), a Finnish film director.
- Saara Hopea (1925–1984), a Finnish designer of glassware and jewellery.
- Grand Duke Vladimir Kirillovich of Russia (1917–1992), head of the Romanov Dynasty
- Gun Lanciai (1920–2013), a Swedish-Finnish sculptor.
- Olof Palme (1884–1918), a Finnish-born Swedish historian and uncle of Olof Palme, PM of Sweden
- Hanna Poulsen (born 1984), Miss Finland 2005
- Helga Sonck-Majewski (1916–2015), Finnish artist
- Johan Ludvig Runeberg (1804–1877), a Finnish priest, lyric and epic, national poet.
- Walter Runeberg (1838–1920) a Finnish neo-classical sculptor, son of poet Johan Ludvig Runeberg
- Solveig von Schoultz (1907–1996), a Swedish-speaking Finnish writer and teacher.
- Olli Soinio (1948–2018), film director and screenwriter
- Georg Magnus Sprengtporten (1740–1819), a Finland-Swedish politician.
- Jacob Magnus Sprengtporten (1727–1786) a Swedish-Finnish army officer and politician, and half-brother of Georg Magnus Sprengtporten.
- Torsten Stålhandske (1593–1644), Swedish officer in the Swedish army during the Thirty Years' War.
- Beda Stjernschantz (1867—1910), one of the first Finnish symbolist painters
- Seppo Telenius (born 1954), writer and historian
- Onni Tommila (born 1999), actor
- Oppi Untracht (1922–2008), an American master metalsmith, educator, and writer
- Ville Vallgren (1855–1940), a Finnish sculptor.
- Osmo Antero Wiio (1928–2013), professor, politician, author of Wiio's laws of communication
- Arvid Wittenberg (1606–1657), Swedish count, field marshal and privy councillor.
- Margaretha Zetterberg (1733–1803), a Finnish textile and handcrafts worker.

=== Sport ===
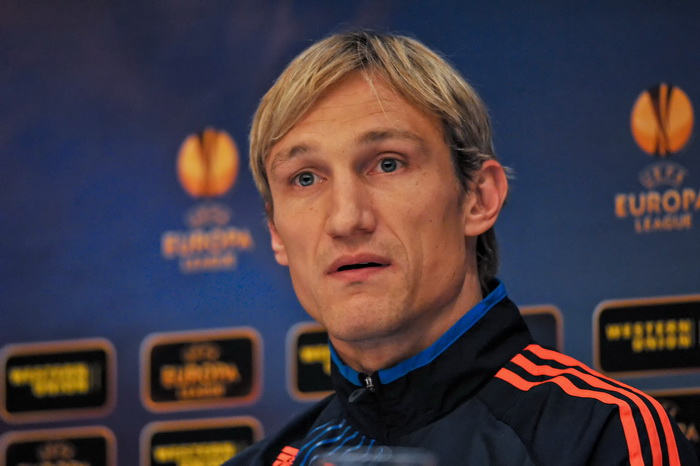
Sami Hyypia, 2012

- Carl Aejemelaeus (1882–1935), a Finnish colonel, modern pentathlete and fencer.
- Torvald Appelroth (1902–1984), fencer, competed at the 1928 Summer Olympics
- Kjell Carlström (born 1976), a Finnish former road racing cyclist,
- Sami Hyypiä (born 1973), former footballer with 589 club caps and captain of Finland with 103 caps
- Sami Laakkonen (born 1974), bandy player; scored when Finland first won the World Championship.
- Simo Lampinen (born 1943), a Finnish former rally driver, a former Flying Finn
- Lauri Lehtinen (1908–1973), a Finnish long-distance runner, gold medallist at the controversial 5000 m race at the 1932 Summer Olympics
- Adolf Lindfors (1879–1959), Finnish wrestler, gold medallist at the 1920 Summer Olympics
- Arthur Lindfors (1893–1977), a Finnish wrestler, twice silver medallist in the Greco-Roman wrestling at the 1920 & 1924 Summer Olympics

== In media ==
In the 1967 British-American espionage film Billion Dollar Brain, a small part of the plot takes place in Riga, the capital of Latvia, which is actually filmed in Porvoo. Also the 1997 American film The Jackal features scenes depicting Russia, which are partly shot in Porvoo.

In the 2021 Disney+ series Loki, Porvoo is listed as a location to which a time reset device was sent.

== International relations ==
=== Twin towns – sister cities ===
Porvoo is twinned with the following cities:

- Dalvíkurbyggð, Iceland
- Dinkelsbühl, Germany
- Hamar, Norway
- Hancock, Michigan, United States
- Kamień Pomorski, Poland
- Lund, Sweden
- Viborg, Denmark
- Viimsi, Estonia
- Viljandi, Estonia

== See also ==
- Borgåbladet
- Diet of Porvoo
- Pellinki Island
- Porvoo Communion
- Porvoo Highway
- Port of Kilpilahti
- Söderskär Lighthouse
