= Eskola =

Family name

Eskola is an Estonian and Finnish surname. Notable people with the surname include:

- Ants Eskola (1908–1989), Estonian actor and singer
- Chris Eskola (born 1976), American musician
- Eric Eskola, American journalist
- Jalmari Eskola (1886–1958), Finnish athlete
- Olev Eskola (1914–1990), Estonian actor
- Pentti Eskola (1883–1964), Finnish geologist
- Seikko Eskola (born 1933), Finnish historian
- Cole Escola, American actor of Finnish descent
