= Kanava (magazine) =

Finnish political magazine

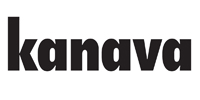
- Categories: Political magazine; Cultural magazine
- Frequency: Eight times per year
- Founded: 1933; 92 years ago
- Company: Otavamedia
- Country: Finland
- Based in: Helsinki
- Language: Finnish
- ISSN: 0355-0303
- OCLC: 1640377

Kanava (Finnish: Channel) is a political and cultural magazine which has been in circulation since 1933. It is owned by Otavamedia. The magazine describes itself as the country's leading discussion forum.

== History and profile ==
The magazine was established in 1933 under the title Suomalainen Suomi (Finnish for "Finnish Finland") as the official media outlet of the Association of Finnish Culture and Identity. It was renamed as Kanava in 1973.

Kanava appears eight times a year and is part of Otavamedia. The magazine provides a discussion platform about society, politics, economics and culture. It featured reviews of Ludwig Wittgenstein's Philosophical Investigations in 1955. In the 1970s and 1980s Kanava was one of the Finnish publications which criticized the silent approach of the country towards the Soviet Union and its allies since most of the publications did not present any truthful information about them.

One of its editors-in-chief was the Finnish historian Seikko Eskola who held the post from 1973 to 1996. As of 2021 Kanava had 5,800 subscribers.

== Contributors ==
Kanava's contributors have been from various political origins. Urho Kekkonen, Mika Waltari, and Jussi Teljo are the early contributors of the magazine. Some of its other notable contributors include Timo Vihavainen, Jorma Ojaharju, Esko Rajakoski, Osmo Antero Wiio, and Lasse Lehtinen. In addition to Finnish writers, the magazine also featured articles by international figures such as Hampden Jackson and Larry J. Shaw.
