= Protected surname =

Surname with restricted use

A protected surname is a surname whose usage is or was subject to restrictions, according to personal name laws of several countries.

== Denmark ==
A Danish surname is protected if there are 2,000 or fewer people with the same surname. If someone's child is going to have a protected surname, this must be in this child's family, i.e., the child must have a family affiliation with the name, as defined by the regulations. Otherwise the parent must get a consent of all adult residents of Denmark with this surname. One may check the list of non-protected surnames issued by the Agency of Family Law, for example, online.

== Estonia ==
During 1935–1940 the Estonian Ministry of the Interior maintained the Family Name Protection Register. The protected Estonian surnames could be given only to the relatives of the surname owner with his consent. This was no longer possible with the Soviet occupation of Estonia. As of 1940, there were 407 protected surnames in the Register.

== Finland ==
Protected Finnish surnames is a historical concept. These were names that the Association of Finnish Culture and Identity had registered as protected for a fee, so that people outside the family could not take it. The Association started compiling "the list of protected Finnish surnames" since 1914, with the corresponding law coming into force in 1921. There were various difficulties with the upholding of the law. Protection was eventually abandoned in 2001. There are about 11,000 known protected surnames. One can check whether the surname was protected online.

== Norway ==
Norwegian surnames are regulated by the Norwegian Names Act of 2002. A citizen may change their family name to any common family name, i.e. any name shared by more than 200 Norwegians. In order to change to a rare family name, permission from every citizen with the name is required. Exceptions to the restrictions on taking a protected surname can be made if you have "a connection to the name", for example through kinship (family name held by a parent, step-parent or foster-parent, grandparent, great-grandparent or great-great-grandparent), by marriage, cohabitation where you have lived together for at least two years or have children together, or through adoption.

== See also ==
- Surname Law (Turkey)
