= Port of Kilpilahti =

Port in Porvoo, Finland

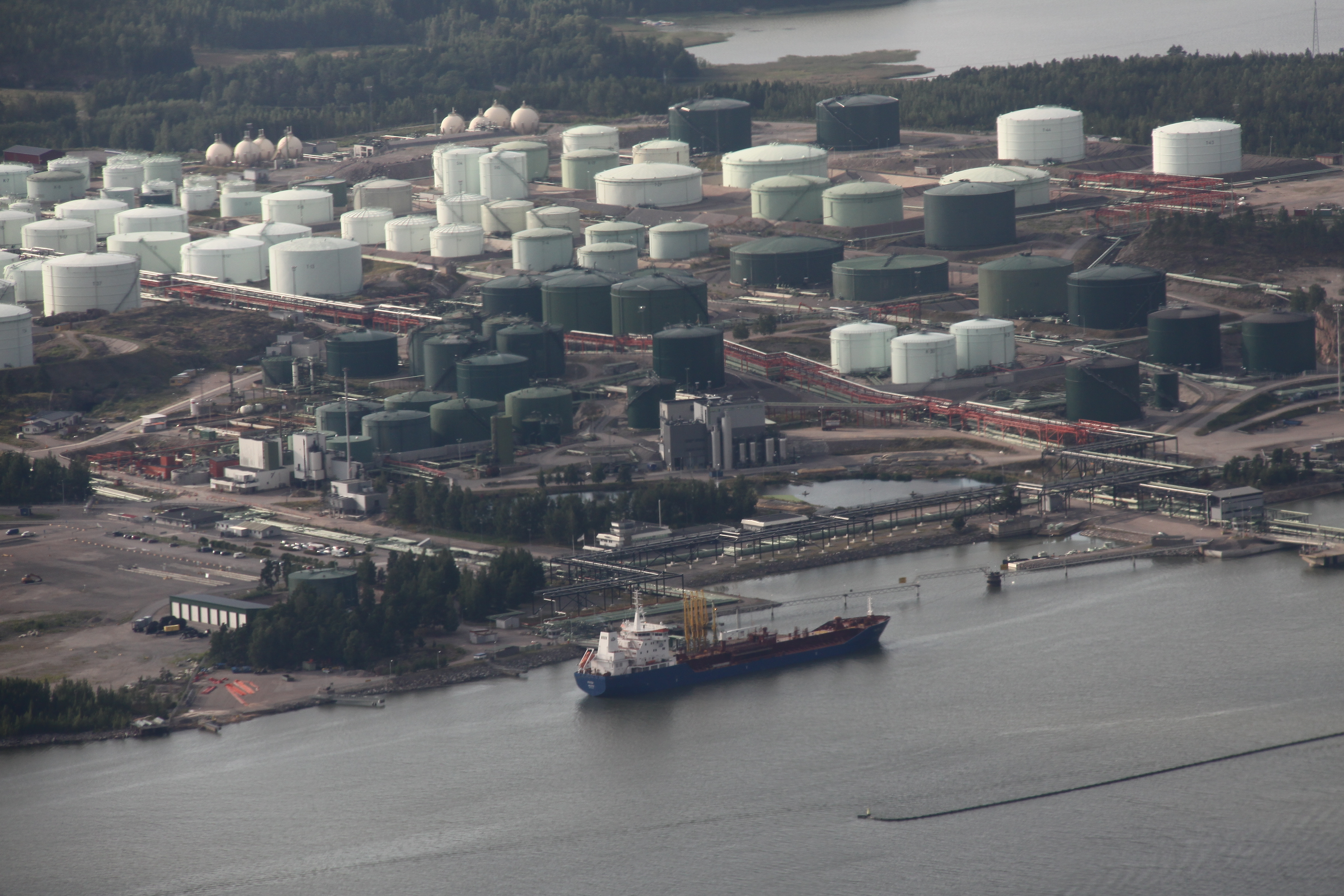
- Port of Kilpilahti with storage tanks
- Click on the map for a fullscreen view
- Port of Kilpilahti (Finland)
- Native name: Kilpilahden satama / Sköldvikin satama – Sköldvik hamn

Location
- Country: Finland
- Location: Porvoo
- Coordinates: 60.309444°N 25.550556°E
- UN/LOCODE: FI SKV

Details
- Opened: 1965
- Type of harbour: coastal natural
- No. of wharfs: 8
- Draft depth: max. 15.3 metres (50 ft) depth

Statistics
- Annual cargo tonnage: c. 22.4m tons (int'l) (2018)

The Port of Kilpilahti (also known by its Swedish name, Sköldvik) is a liquid cargo port in the city of Porvoo, on the Gulf of Finland shore some 35 kilometres (22 mi) east-by-northeast of Helsinki.

The port grew up around the Neste oil refinery built there in the mid-1960s, and even today it still mostly handles crude and refined oil and petrochemical products. Adjacent to the port is the largest oil refinery and petrochemical cluster in the Nordic region, covering an area of c. 13 square kilometres (5.0 sq mi) and hosting some 40 companies including Neste, Borealis AG and Veolia.

With total annual international cargo throughput of 22.4 million tons in 2018, Kilpilahti is the biggest port in Finland by cargo tonnage. Of the total, approximately two-thirds is made up of imports.

== See also ==
- Ports of the Baltic Sea
