= Osmo Antero Wiio =

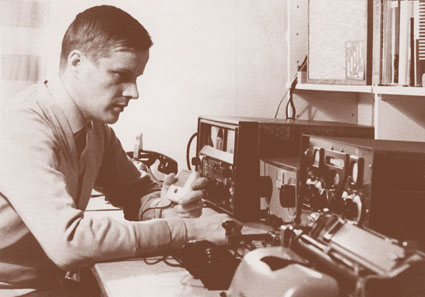
Osmo A. Wiio (1961)

Osmo Antero Wiio (4 February 1928 – 20 February 2013) was a Finnish academic, journalist, author and member of the Finnish Parliament. He is best known for his somewhat facetious Wiio's laws around communication, succinctly summarized as "Communication usually fails, except by accident".

== Background ==
Wiio was born in Porvoo, Finland. His parents were actor Ivar Fredrik Wiio and seamstress Jaana Erika Sanelma Aariainen. He married home economics teacher Leena Marjatta Waronen (1928–2012) in 1954. They had two children, Antti Juhani (1955), and Juha James (1957). Wiio graduated from the University of Helsinki in 1954 with a masters in political science. He received his doctorate from the University of Tampere in 1968.

== Career ==
Wiio was an economics professor at the University of Helsinki from 1973 to 1975. He then became a Member of the Finnish Parliament as part of the Liberal People's Party from 1975 to 1979. He returned to the University of Helsinki as head of the Department of Communication from 1978 through 1991.

Wiio authored numerous articles and books on communications. He later founded Tekniikan Maailma magazine in 1952, selling it a year later. Wiio received the International Communication Association (ICA) Industry Award in 1974 as well as the 2000 Nokia Award. At the beginning of the 2000s he was among the contributors of the Kanava magazine.

Wiio was also a prominent Finnish radio amateur with the callsign OH2TK and the honorary chairman of the Finnish Amateur Radio League since 1994.

== Bibliography ==
- Wiio, Osmo A. and Somerikko, Unto V: Enthusiast radio book . Harrastelutaito Ltd, 1950.
- Caves of Lascaux still show (youth novel). Otava, 1958.
- Wiio, Osmo A. and Somerikko, Unto V: Pocket radios and transistors . World of Technology, 1958.
- Wiio, Osmo A. and Somerikko, Unto V: New Book Radio . The second edition. Helsinki: World of Technology, 1959.
- Wiio, Osmo A. and Somerikko, Unto V: Youth radio book . World of Technology, 1960.
- Wiio, Osmo A.: Audience and Broadcasting: A Survey broadcasting and programs will be similar in opinions, as well as the broadcasting system as a whole . Helsinki: Weilin + Göös, 1971.
- Do we understand what you say? Communication - communication . 5, revised edition (1st edition 1968). Prisma data library 20 Helsinki: Weilin + Göös, 1973. ISBN 951-35-0487-5 .
- Wiio, Osmo A., Somerikko, Unto V and Laine, Reijo R: Electronics for you . EU hobby Books, 1975.
- Wiio laws - and a bit of the other . Espoo: Weilin + Göös, 1978. ISBN 951-35-1657-1 .
- Wiio, Osmo A. Laine and Laine, Reijo R: handbook for radio amateurs . EU hobby Books, 1978.
- Basics of Communication . Art: Alice in Karvonen, Pertti Rokkan. 5. revised edition. Espoo: Weilin + Göös, 1989. ISBN 951-35-4407-9 .
- Cyrano nose: a witty columnist science world . Helsinki: AW-information product, 1990. ISBN 951-96141-0-9 .
- Wiio, Osmo A. & Broms, Henri: Crescent, star and sun: our day in the Middle and Far East . Helsinki: Helsinki University Press, 1991. ISBN 951-570-074-4 .
- Communications research directions . Media and Communication Research Society Publication Series No. 12 Helsinki: Helsinki University Press, 1992. ISBN 951-570-107-4 .
- Wiio, Osmo A. & Puska, Pekka: Health Communication Guide . London: Oxford University Press, 1993. ISBN 951-1-12522-2 .
- Introduction to communication . 6. updated edition. Espoo: Weilin + Göös, 1994 (9th edition 2000). ISBN 951-35-5898-3 .
- Wiio, Osmo A.: Guilty or not guilty?: Television and violence: An International Comparison . Helsinki: University of Helsinki, 1998.
- Communications, information technology and communications performance . University of Helsinki, Lahti Research and Training Centre, Learning materials 85 Lahti: University of Helsinki, Lahti Research and Training Centre, 2000. ISBN 951-45-8809-6 .
- Finnish media landscape . Edited by Charles Nordenstreng and Osmo A. Wiio. Porvoo: WSOY, 2001.
- Tomorrow is today. 50 years of information technology forecasts. Helsinki: Sanoma Magazines Finland, 2002. ISBN 951-832-071-3 .
- Communication usually fails - except by accident: Wiio laws and the future of communications . Espoo: Delta Books, 2009. ISBN 978-951-96141-3-7 .
