= Timo Vihavainen =

Finnish historian

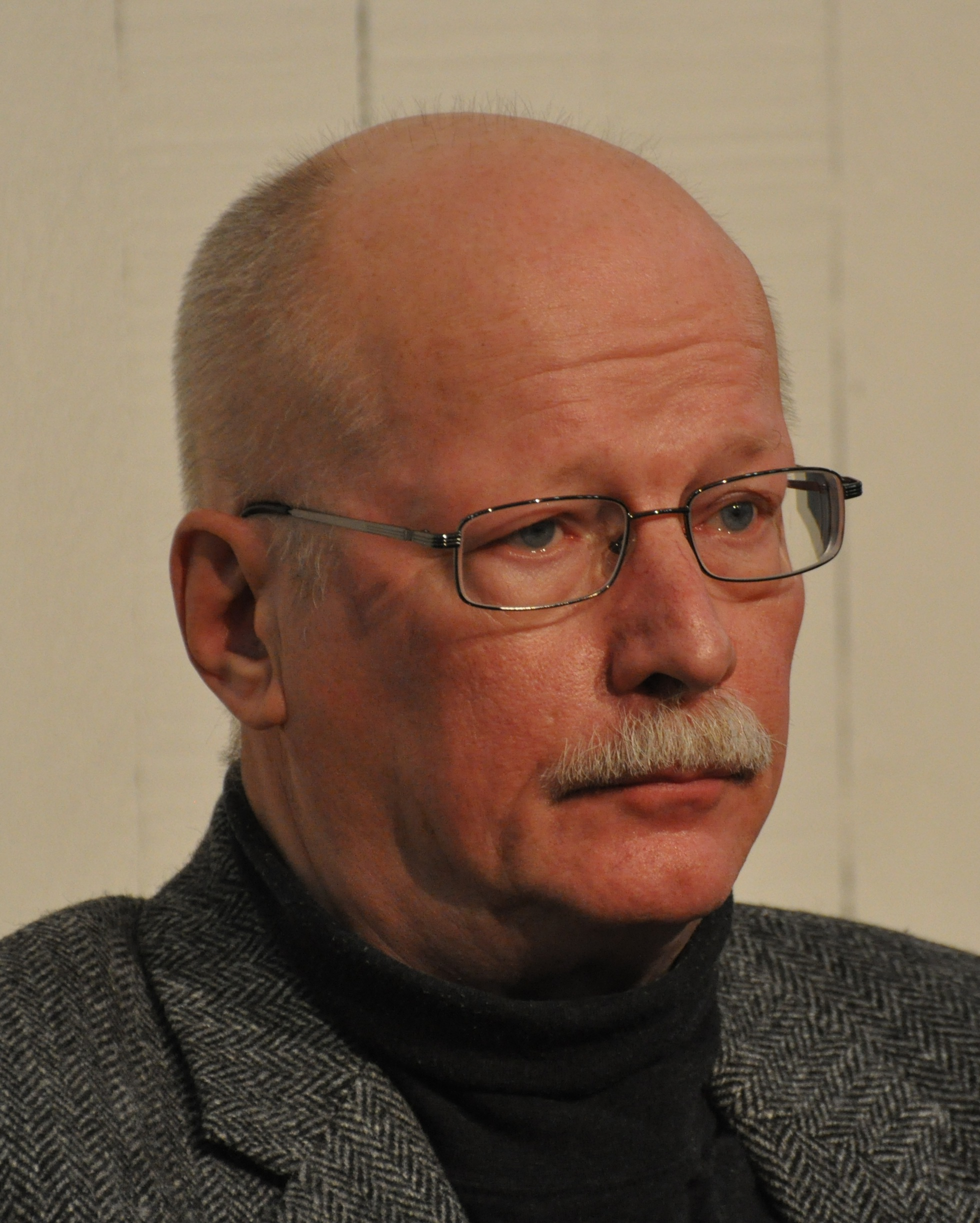
Timo Vihavainen in 2013.

Timo Juhani Vihavainen (born 9 May 1947) is a Finnish historian and a professor of Russian Studies at the University of Helsinki. He has written extensively on Russian and Finnish history. Vihavainen graduated as a Master of Philosophy in 1970, a Licentiate in Philosophy in 1983, a Doctor of Philosophy degree in 1988 and a Docent in Russian history in 1992. He is a member of the Finnish Academy of Science and Letters since 2009. At the beginning of the 2000s he was among the contributors of the Kanava magazine.

Vihavainen was Visiting Fellow at Moscow State University in 1972-1973, Assistant of East-European History at Renvall Institute, University of Helsinki 1989-2000, Acting director of the Renvall Institute 1992, Director of the Finnish Institute in St. Petersburg in 1998-2000, and Senior Research Fellow at the Finnish Academy 2000-2002. Professor of Russian Studies at University of Helsinki 2002-2015.

== Board memberships ==
Member of Board of Advisors at European University in St. Petersburg, Faculty of History. Member of Board at Aleksanteri Institute, Member of Board at the Finnish St. Petersburg Foundation, Head of History Program at Finnish-Russian Cross-Border University, Member of Board of Advisors at Helsinki Slavonic Library, and Member of Board at "Russia in Europe" Cross-Border Graduate School.

== Scientific societies ==
Member at Finnish Academy of Sciences and Letters, Chairman of Russian Section at the Finnish Historical Society, and Chairman at St. Petersburg Society, Board Member at Institute for Russian and East European Studies, Board Member at Finnish Society for Russian and East European Studies, Board Member at Finnish International Studies Association, and Member at International Committee of Historians - Committee for the Study of Russian Revolutions.

== Awards ==
- P.E. Svinhufvud medal (Finland, 1991)
- Honorary Doctor at Petrozavodsk State University (Russia, 2005).
- Order of Friendship (Russia, 2014)

== Publications ==
=== Books in English ===
- Vihavainen, Timo (2006). Inner adversary : the struggle against philistinism as the moral mission of the Russian intelligentsia. New Academia Publishing. ISBN 978-0-9777908-2-1.

=== Books in Finnish ===
- Vihavainen, Timo (1982). IX Neuvostoliiton skandinavistien kongressi. Helsinki: Helsingin yliopisto. ISBN 951-45-2770-4.
- Vihavainen, Timo (1983). Aleksandr Nekritšin muistelmat ja historiantutkimus Neuvostoliitossa. Helsinki: Helsingin yliopisto. ISBN 951-45-3513-8.
- Vihavainen, Timo (1988). Suomi neuvostolehdistössä 1918-1920. Helsinki: Suomen Historiallinen Seura. ISBN 951-8915-09-1.
- Vihavainen, Timo (1991). Kansakunta rähmällään : suomettumisen lyhyt historia. Helsinki: Otava. ISBN 951-1-11397-6.
- Vihavainen, Timo (1998). Stalin ja suomalaiset. Helsinki: Otava. ISBN 978-951-1-13075-8.
- Vihavainen, Timo, ed. (2003). O. W. Kuusinen ja Neuvostoliiton ideologinen kriisi vuosina 1957-64. Helsinki: Suomalaisen Kirjallisuuden Seura. ISBN 951-746-538-6.
- Vihavainen, Timo, ed. (2004). Venäjän kahdet kasvot : Venäjä-kuva suomalaisen identiteetin rakennuskivenä. Helsinki: Edita. ISBN 951-37-3954-6.
- Vihavainen, Timo, ed. (2006). Opas venäläisyyteen. Helsinki: Otava. ISBN 978-951-1-22253-8.
- Ketola, Kari; Vihavainen, Timo (2008). Venäjän historia suomalaiselle yritysjohtajalle. Helsinki: Finemor. ISBN 978-952-92-4656-4.
- Iljuha, Olga; Tsamutali, Aleksei; Vihavainen, Timo, eds. (2009). Monikasvoinen Suomi : venäläisten mielikuvia Suomesta ja suomalaisista. Helsinki: Edita. ISBN 978-951-37-5341-2.
- Vihavainen, Timo (2009). Länsimaiden tuho. Kustannusosakeyhtiö Otava. ISBN 978-951-1-23884-3.
- Vihavainen, Timo (2011). Itäraja häviää: Venäjä ja Suomen kaksi vuosisataa. Kustannusosakeyhtiö Otava. ISBN 978-951-1-24709-8.
- Vihavainen, Timo; Hamilo, Marko; Konstig, Joonas, eds. (2015). Mitä mieltä Suomessa saa olla : suvaitsevaisto vs. arvokonservatiivit. Helsinki: Minerva. ISBN 951-312-123-2.
- Vihavainen, Timo (2014). Vanhan Venäjän Paluu. Helsinki: Otava. ISBN 978-951-1-29150-3.
- Vihavainen, Timo (2017). Barbarian paluu: Euroopan auringon laskiessa. Kustannusosakeyhtiö Otava. ISBN 978-951-1-30872-0.

=== Books in Russian ===
- Vihavainen, Timo (2000). Stalin i finny (Сталин и финны). St. Petersburg: Zhurnal Neva (Журнал Нева). ISBN 978-5-87516-179-7.
- Vihavainen, Timo, ed. (2004). Sto zametshatelnyh finnov : kaleidoskop biografi (Сто замечательных финнов : калейдоскоп биографий). Helsinki: Suomalaisen Kirjallisuuden Seura (общество финскои литературу). ISBN 951-746-522-X.
- Vihavainen, Timo (2004). Vnutrenni vrag : borba s mestsanstvom kak moralnaja missija russkoi intelligentsii (Внутренний враг. Борьба с мещанством как моральная миссия русской интеллигенции). St. Petersburg: Izdatelski dom "Kolo" (Издательский дом «Коло»). ISBN 5-901841-11-5.
- Vihavainen, Timo, ed. (2007). Dva lika Rossii (Два лика России). St. Petersburg: Evropeiski dom (Европейский дом). ISBN 978-5-8015-0212-0.
