= Ylike =

Village in Uusimaa, Finland

Coordinates: 60°23′N 025°51′E

Ylike is a small village 10 miles outside of Porvoo city in Finland.
