= Tarmola =

District in Porvoo, Finland

Coordinates: 60°24′N 025°41′E

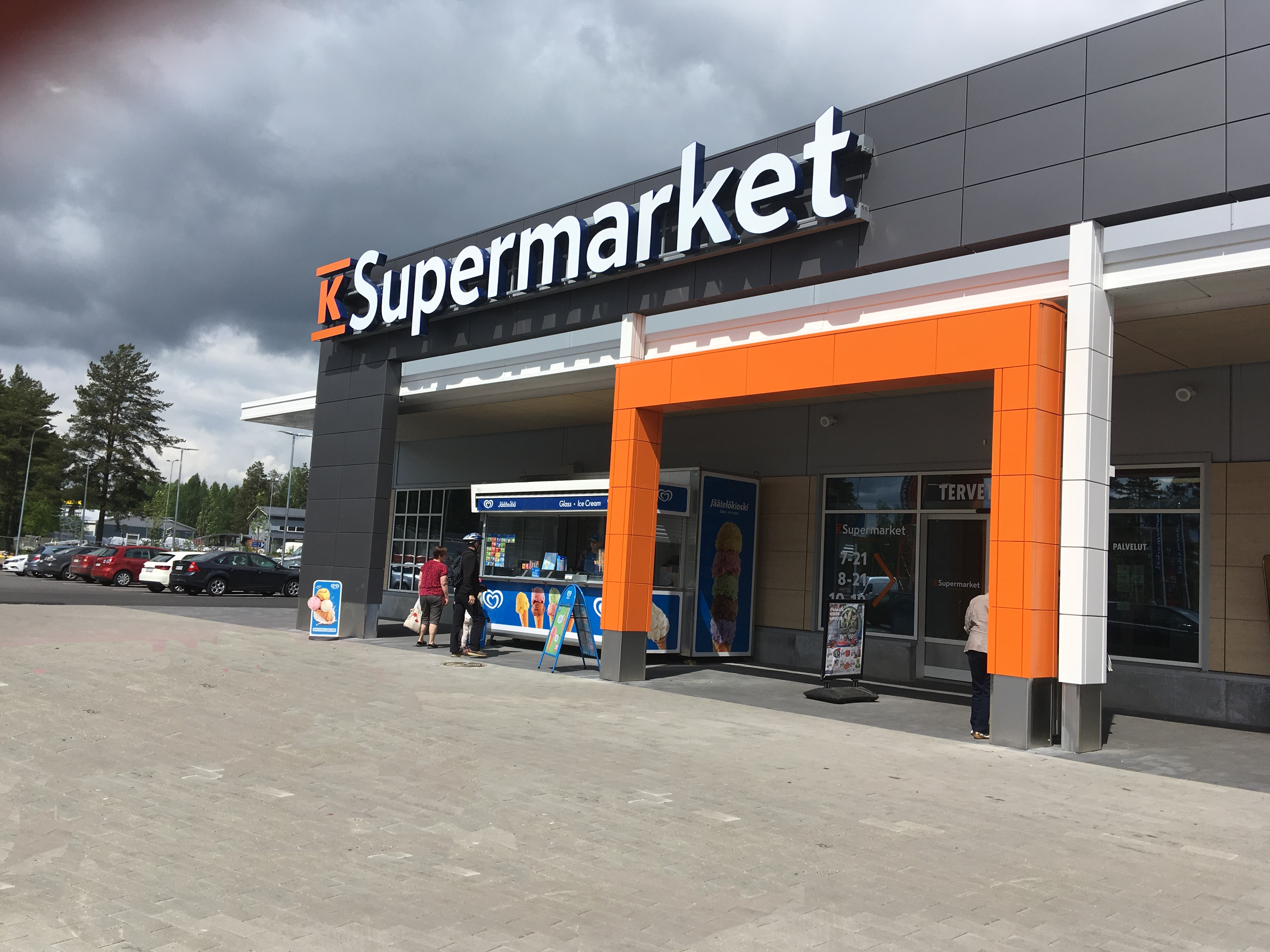
K-Supermarket store in Tarmola

Tarmola (Finnish: [ˈtɑrmolɑ]; Swedish: Östermalm) is a district in Porvoo, Finland. It is located in the northeastern part of the downtown area along the Regional Road 170, a few kilometers south of the Highway 7 (E18). The old town of Porvoo is 2 kilometres (1.2 mi) from Tarmola.

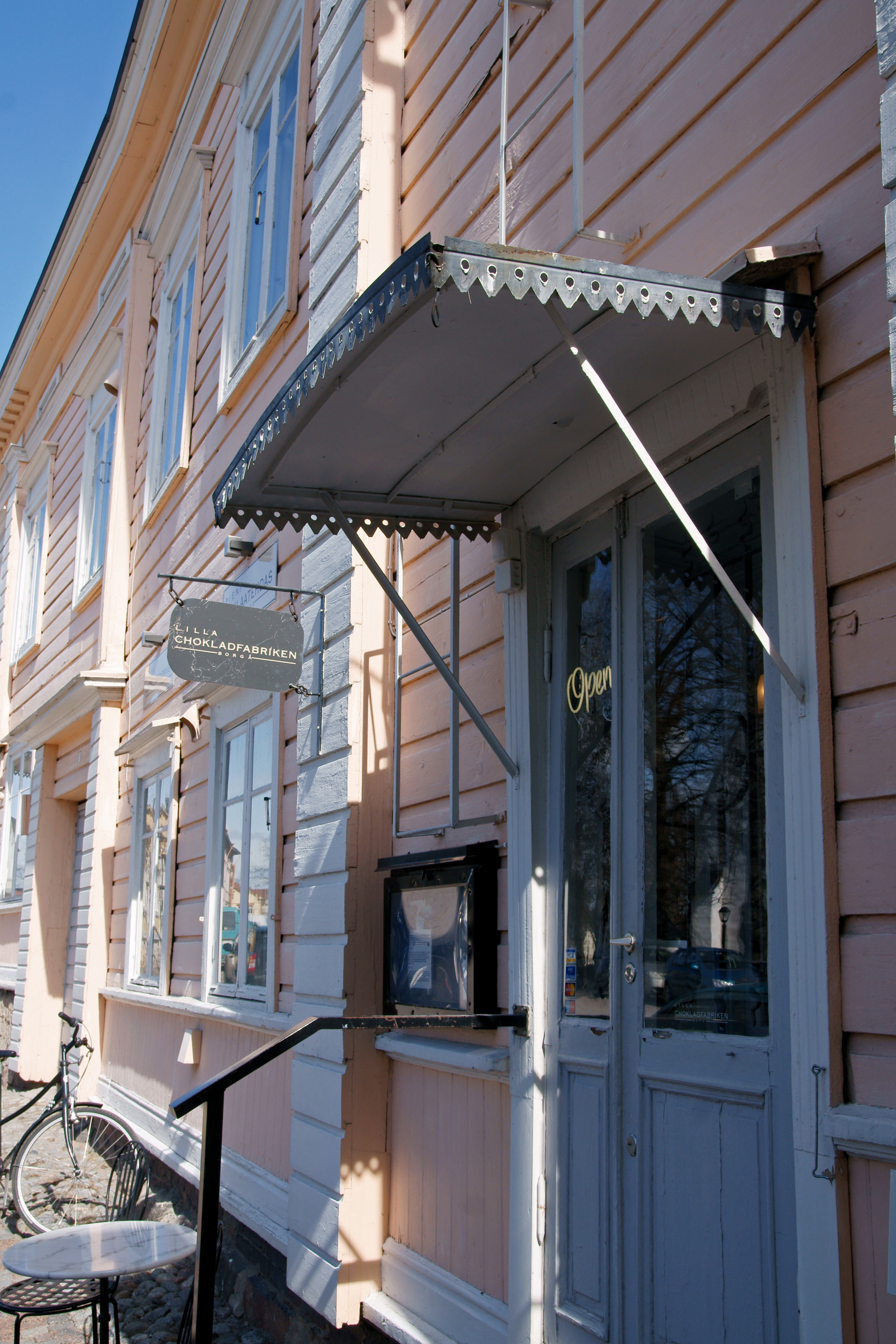
The Pieni Suklaatehdas store

Services in the area include the grocery stores K-Supermarket and Lidl, the Alko store, the Tokmanni discount store, the Rinta-Jouppi car dealership and the Veikon Kone electronics store. Other significant places also include the chocolate and bakery stores of the Brunberg Factory and Pieni Suklaatehdas. Tarmola is also home to the Kaupunginhaka business and industrial area, and the local Padel hall.
