= Association of Finnish Culture and Identity =

Finnish cultural organization

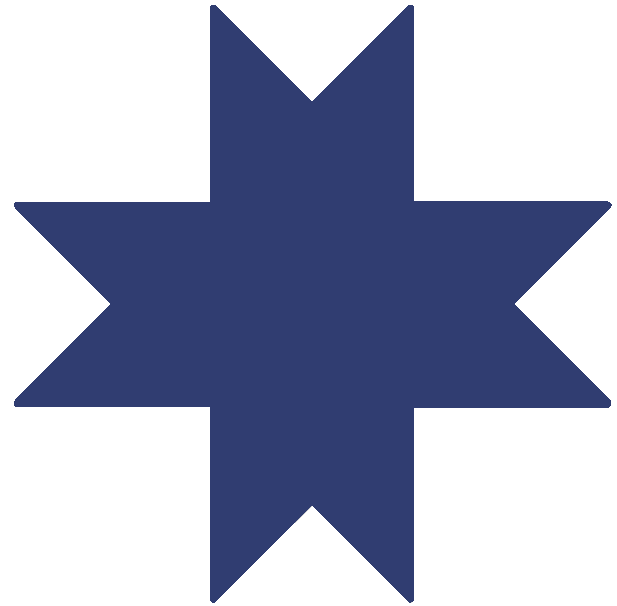
- Formation: 12 May 1906; 119 years ago
- Headquarters: Helsinki, Finland
- President: Professor Emeritus Ilmari Rostila
- Website: suomalaisuudenliitto.fi

The Association of Finnish Culture and Identity (Finnish: Suomalaisuuden Liitto), also known as the Finnish Alliance, is a Finnish cultural organization. The official name of the association is in German Verband für das Finnentum e. V. and in French La Ligue Finlandaise.

== History ==
The Finnish Alliance was founded by writer Johannes Linnankoski in 1906. The founding date was the 100th anniversary of Johan Vilhelm Snellman, a prominent national Finnish philosopher and statesman. The purpose was and is still today to awaken and to strengthen the sense of national identity, to promote Finnish, especially Finnish speaking, culture. A significant goal is to cultivate the Finnish language.

One of the most far-reaching manifestations of the Finnish Alliance’s activities was the mass fennification of family names in 1906–1907. This was repeated in 1935–1936 with the result of more than 200,000 people changing their family names into Finnish. The Association of Finnish Culture and Identity has played a remarkable role in Finnish cultural life. It provided the initiatives which led to the creation of the Finnish Cultural Foundation (Suomen kulttuurirahasto), Finland Society (Suomi-Seura, an organization to unite the Finns abroad), and the Family Federation of Finland (Väestöliitto). The association started a magazine, Suomalainen Suomi (Finnish: Finnish Finland), which was renamed as Kanava (Finnish: Channel) in 1973. In the past the Association coull register protected surnames, for a fee.

The President of the Finnish Alliance in 1930–1932 was Urho Kekkonen, the President of Finland in 1956–1981.

The Finnish Alliance is an important element in the Finnish establishment. It provides expert advice on matters such as the displaying of the Finnish flag and Finnish family names. It creates and maintains contacts between Finland and Finns living abroad. The Association of Finnish Culture and Identity is well known for emphasizing the Finnish pupils’ and students’ right to determine for themselves the foreign languages they wish to study.

In addition, the Association of Finnish Culture and Identity pursues research, publishes books, sells Finnish flags made in Finland, gives lectures and is involved in many other activities in its goal to strengthen the Finnish identity.

== Current board ==
The current chairman of the association is professor emeritus Ilmari Rostila, 1st vice chairman is Susanna Koski, and 2nd vice chairman is Sebastian Vilja.

== Chairmen ==
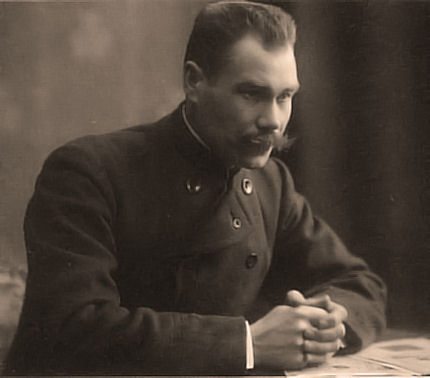
The founder of the Association of Finnish Culture and Identity, writer Johannes Linnankoski.

Chairmen	
Johannes Linnankoski	1906
Kaarle Krohn	1907
J. J. Mikkola	1907–1909
Väinö Voionmaa	1915–1916
A. A. Koskenjaakko	1917–1918
Väinö Salminen	1919
Rafael Engelberg	1920–1924
J. R. Koskimies	1925–1926
Yrjö Ruutu	1928
Elpiö Kaila	1929
Urho Kekkonen	1930–1932
Veikko Heiskanen	1933–1947
Niilo Kallio	1948–1954
Veikko Heiskanen	1955–1956
Erkki Salonen	1957–1968
Kauko Sipponen	1968–1970
Kari Tarasti	1970–1974
Jouko Hulkko	1974–1978
Veikko Löyttyniemi	1978–1986
Martti Häikiö	1986–1988
Erkki Pihkala	1988–1996
Seppo Heikinheimo	1996–1997
Pentti Huttunen	1998–2003
Heikki Tala	2003–2009
Sampo Terho	2009–2017
Ilmari Rostila	2017–2025
Tiera Laitinen	2025-Present
