= Jorma Ojaharju =

Finnish writer (1938–2011)

Jorma Ojaharju (Vaasa, 10 October 1938 – 8 February 2011) was a Finnish author.

He had been described as a "boxer of rough prose" because of his background as a sailor and a boxer, but also because of his relaxed narrative. Ojaharji published his writings in 1966 and his main work was the so-called Vaasa-trilogy - 'Valkoinen kaupunki' (1976), 'Paremmassa maailmassa' (1979) and 'Maa kallis isien' (1982) - which depicts history from the Finnish Civil War to the present day through the eyes of a few sailors. As a describer of recent history he chose another path compared with other Finnish writers of the same generation, as he strove for a realistic narrative, but also left room for fantasy and myth. Jorma Ojaharju's style of writing has been compared with Colombian novelist Gabriel García Márquez who is widely considered the leading exponent of the literary style called magical realism. Aside from being a writer and his history as a sailor, Ojaharju also worked as a rock blaster, a harbour and dock worker, and a diver. At the beginning of the 2000s he was among the contributors of the Kanava magazine.

Ojaharju died on 8 February 2011 at the age of 72. He is buried in the Hietaniemi Cemetery in Helsinki.
