= Seppo Heikinheimo =

Finnish musicologist (1938–1997)

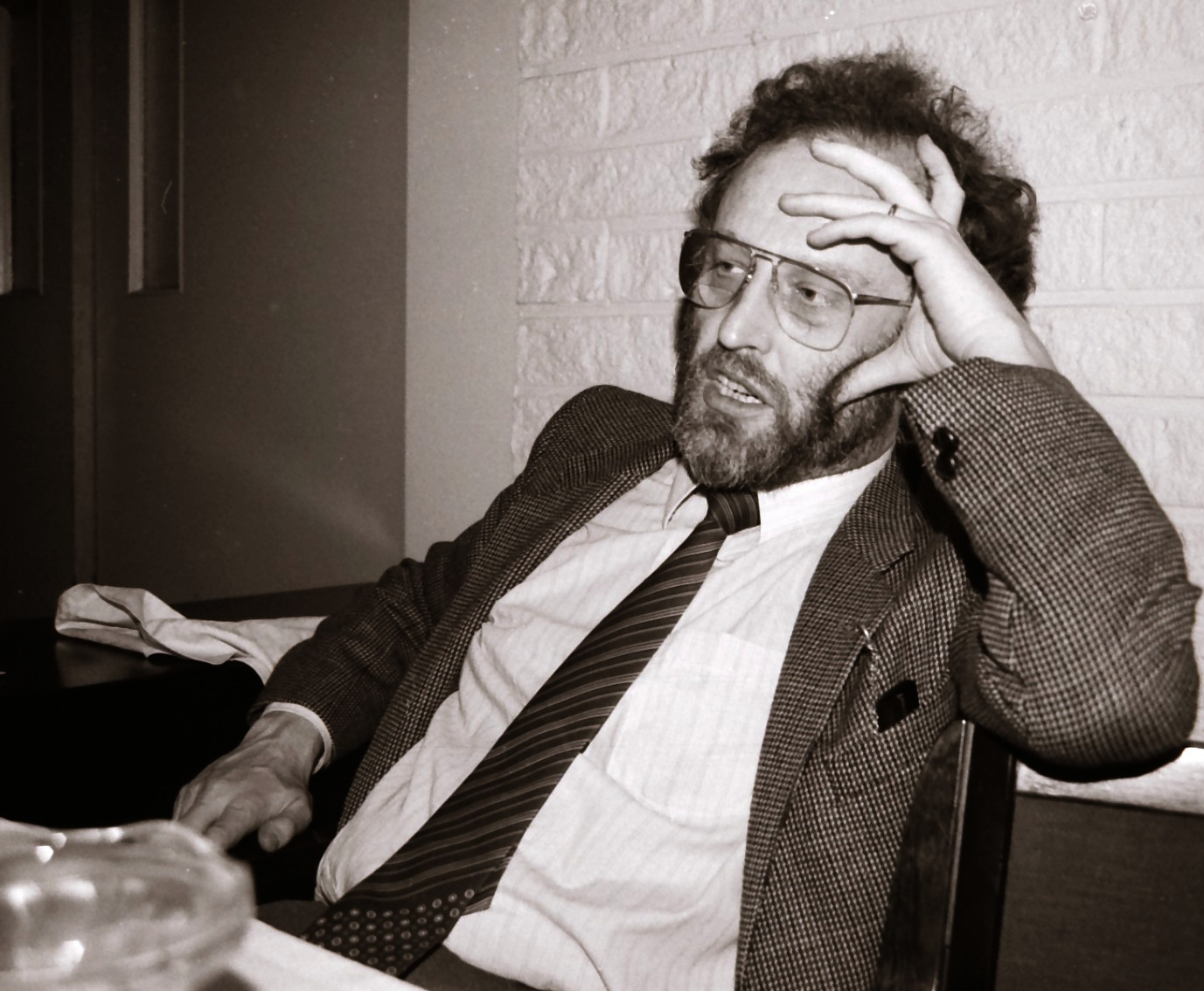
- Heikinheimo in 1985
- Born: 3 June 1938; Helsinki
- Died: 26 May 1997 (aged 58); Helsinki

Seppo Erkki Sakari Heikinheimo (3 June 1938 – 26 May 1997) was a Finnish musicologist, music journalist, writer and translator.

Seppo Heikinheimo's father was the pianist Sakari Heikinheimo. Seppo began his piano studies with Erik Tawaststjerna, and after the matriculation examination he studied musicology and classical philology at Helsinki University. He defended his Ph.D. thesis in 1972; the subject was the electronic music of Karlheinz Stockhausen.

Heikinheimo started his journalistic career in Uusi Suomi newspaper in 1959, first as a photographer and then as a writer. In 1963, recommended by Tawaststjerna, he moved on to Helsingin Sanomat and worked the rest of his life there as a music journalist. On the top of that, he also worked as an intendant of the Helsinki Philharmonic Orchestra in the 1970s.

As a critic, Heikinheimo was harsh and sharp. He only knew excellence and inferiority; mediocrity was the worst he could think of. He used W. A. Mozart and Dmitri Shostakovich as yardsticks when evaluating musical accomplishments. In the 1960s Heikinheimo was an advocate of musical modernism and radicalism but later became very suspicious of contemporary music, alienating his former friends.

In the early 1990s, Heikinheimo was active in starting the Mikkeli Festival. Heikinheimo had a summer villa near Mikkeli in the near the Lake Puula in Hirvensalmi.

Heikinheimo's literary output as a writer, translator and editor was wide. He wrote three voluminous biographies, on Martti Talvela (1978), Aarre Merikanto (1985) and Oskar Merikanto (1995), and translated numerous works of fact and fiction into Finnish, including books by Roald Dahl, Maxim Gorky, Daniel Barenboim, Garri Kasparov, Yuri Lyubimov and others. Of special significance is his translation of the controversial Testimony by Dmitri Shostakovich which he made directly from the Russian-language manuscript. Heikinheimo is known to have used pen names "Antti Virtanen" ja "Raimo Ontronen".

A categorical and highly controversial person, Heikinheimo was proud of his Finnish fatherland and despised the Finland's Swedish language as the language of the occupiers. He was critical of the Soviet Union but was a friend of many Russian musicians like Vladimir Ashkenazy, Valery Gergiev, Sergey Musaelyan. For a short period of time, he was the chairman of Association of Finnish Culture and Identity.

The last vicissitudes of Heikinheimo's life were dramatic: he wrote his memoir but seemed to suffer from an unstable state of mind. After having sent the manuscript to his publisher Otava, Heikinheimo committed suicide in a hotel room in Helsinki.

A couple of months later the book was published, with the uncompromising title Mätämunan muistelmat (roughly, “Memoirs of a Rotten Egg” or “Memoirs of a Pariah”). It is a book full of vivid and snarky anecdotes from home and abroad, spanning Heikinheimo's whole career, with 924 names in the personal index. Heikinheimo ends the book in Biblical words of the Aramaic language, "Eeli, Eeli lama sabaktani."

Seppo Heikinheimo was married to the singer (mezzo-soprano) Päivi Heikinheimo.

== Books ==
- The Electronic Music of Karlheinz Stockhausen: Studies on the Esthetical and Formal Problems of its First Phase. Translated by Brad Absetz. Acta Musicologica Fennica, 6. Ph.D. thesis. Helsinki University. Helsinki: Suomen musiikkitieteellinen seura, 1972. ISSN 0587-2448
- Stereo-opas. Helsinki: Tammi, 1973. ISBN 951-30-0300-0.
- Ontronen, Raimo: Tehtävä Sorokassa. Hämeenlinna: Karisto, 1977. ISBN 951-23-1137-2.
- Martti Talvela: Jättiläisen muotokuva. Helsinki: Otava, 1978. ISBN 951-1-04859-7.
- Aarre Merikanto: Säveltäjänkohtalo itsenäisessä Suomessa. Helsinki: WSOY, 1985. ISBN 951-0-13319-1.
- Oskar Merikanto ja hänen aikansa. Helsinki: Otava, 1995. ISBN 951-1-13778-6.
- Mätämunan muistelmat. Memoir. Helsinki: Otava, 1997. ISBN 951-1-14997-0.
