= Seikko Eskola =

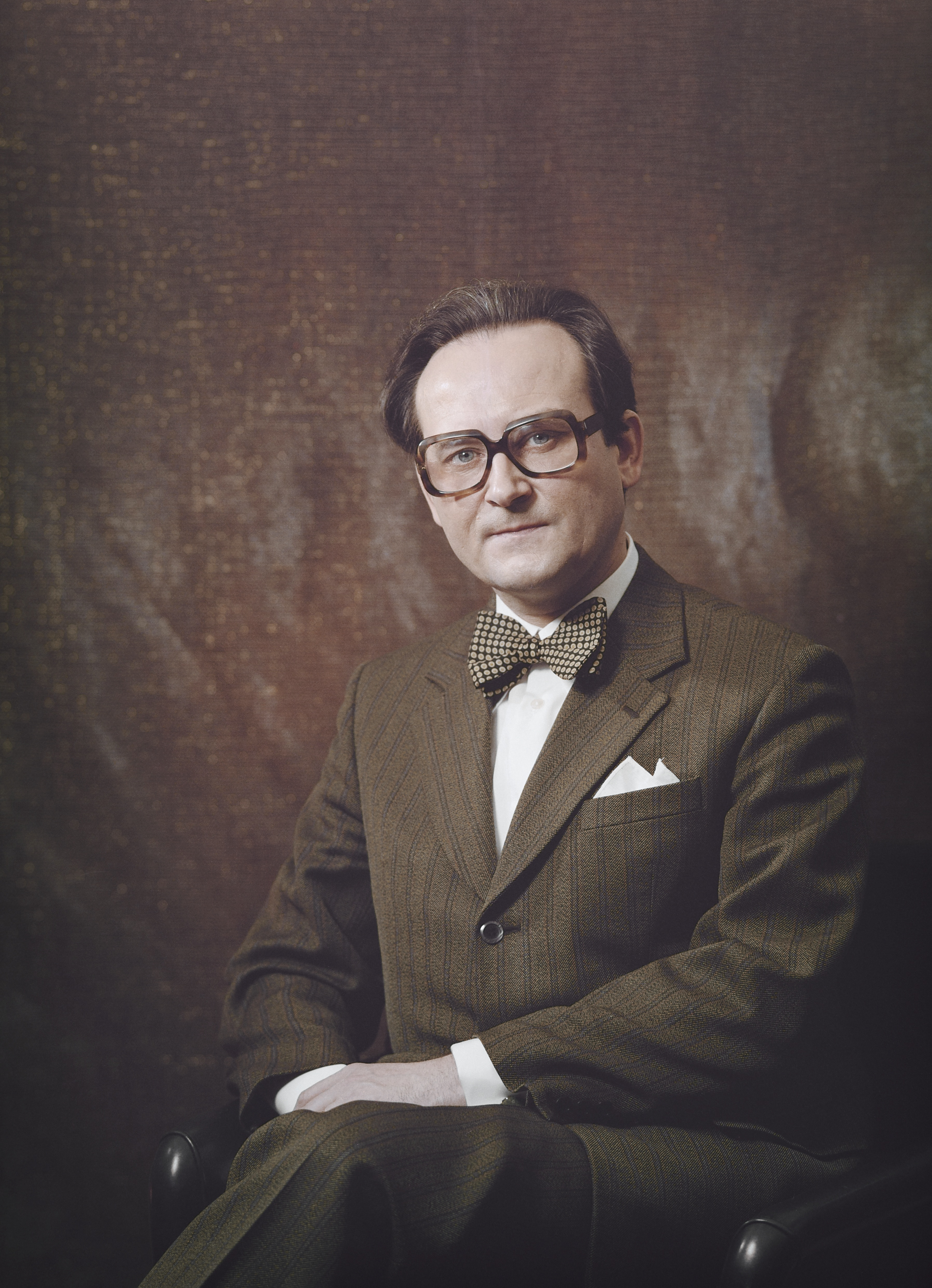
Seikko Eskola in 1978.

Seikko Aarne Väinämö Eskola (born 13 September 1933 in Riihimäki) is a Finnish historian and debater. Eskola was 1974–1997 assistant professor in general history at Tampere University. He was editor in chief for the cultural journal Kanava 1979–1993.

Amongst his works are to be found the journalistic historical work Suomen kysymys ja Ruotsin mielipide (1965), which contains a study of Swedish opinions about the status of Finland during 1914–1917, and Yhdysvaltain lehdistö ja Suomen kriisi (1974), which is about the American press and the Finnish crisis, and Kreikka, Englanti ja Yhdysvallat 1944–1953 (1971). He became professor honoris causa in 1993.
