= 20th-century classical music =

Art movement

20th-century classical music is Western art music that was written between 1901 and 2000, inclusive. Musical style diverged during the 20th century as it never had previously, so this century was without a dominant style. Modernism, impressionism, and post-romanticism can all be traced to the decades before the turn of the 20th century, but can be included because they evolved beyond the musical boundaries of the 19th-century styles that were part of the earlier common practice period. Neoclassicism and expressionism came mostly after 1900. Minimalism started later in the century and can be seen as a change from the modern to postmodern era, although some date postmodernism from as early as about 1930. Aleatory, atonality, serialism, musique concrète, and electronic music were all developed during the century. Jazz and ethnic folk music became important influences on many composers during this century.

== History ==
At the turn of the century, music was characteristically late Romantic in style. Composers such as Gustav Mahler, Richard Strauss and Jean Sibelius were pushing the bounds of post-Romantic symphonic writing. At the same time, the Impressionist movement, spearheaded by Claude Debussy, was being developed in France. Debussy in fact loathed the term Impressionism: "I am trying to do 'something different—in a way realities—what the imbeciles call 'impressionism' is a term which is as poorly used as possible, particularly by art critics". Maurice Ravel's music, also often labelled as impressionist, explores music in many styles not always related to it (see the discussion on Neoclassicism, below).

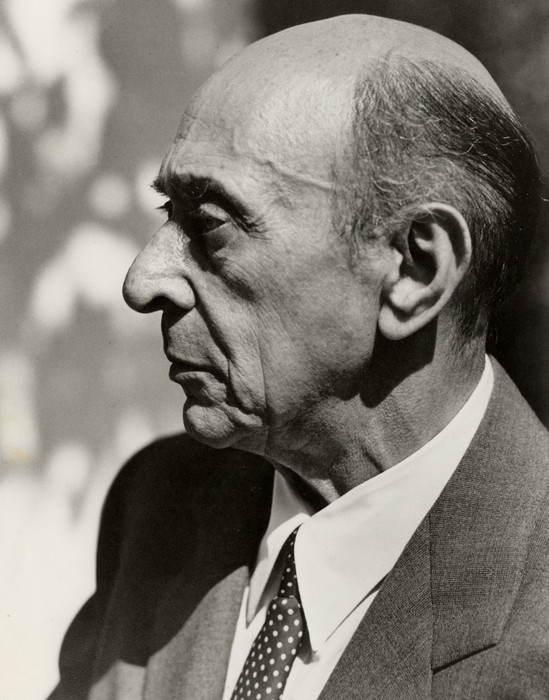
Arnold Schoenberg, Los Angeles, 1948

Many composers reacted to the Post-Romantic and Impressionist styles and moved in different directions. An important moment in defining the course of music throughout the century was the widespread break with traditional tonality, effected in diverse ways by different composers in the first decade of the century. From this sprang an unprecedented "linguistic plurality" of styles, techniques, and expression. In Vienna, Arnold Schoenberg developed atonality, out of the expressionism that arose in the early part of the 20th century. He later developed the twelve-tone technique which was developed further by his disciples Alban Berg and Anton Webern; later composers (including Pierre Boulez) developed it further still. Stravinsky explored twelve-tone technique, too, as did many other composers; indeed, even Scott Bradley used the technique in his scores for the Tom and Jerry cartoons.

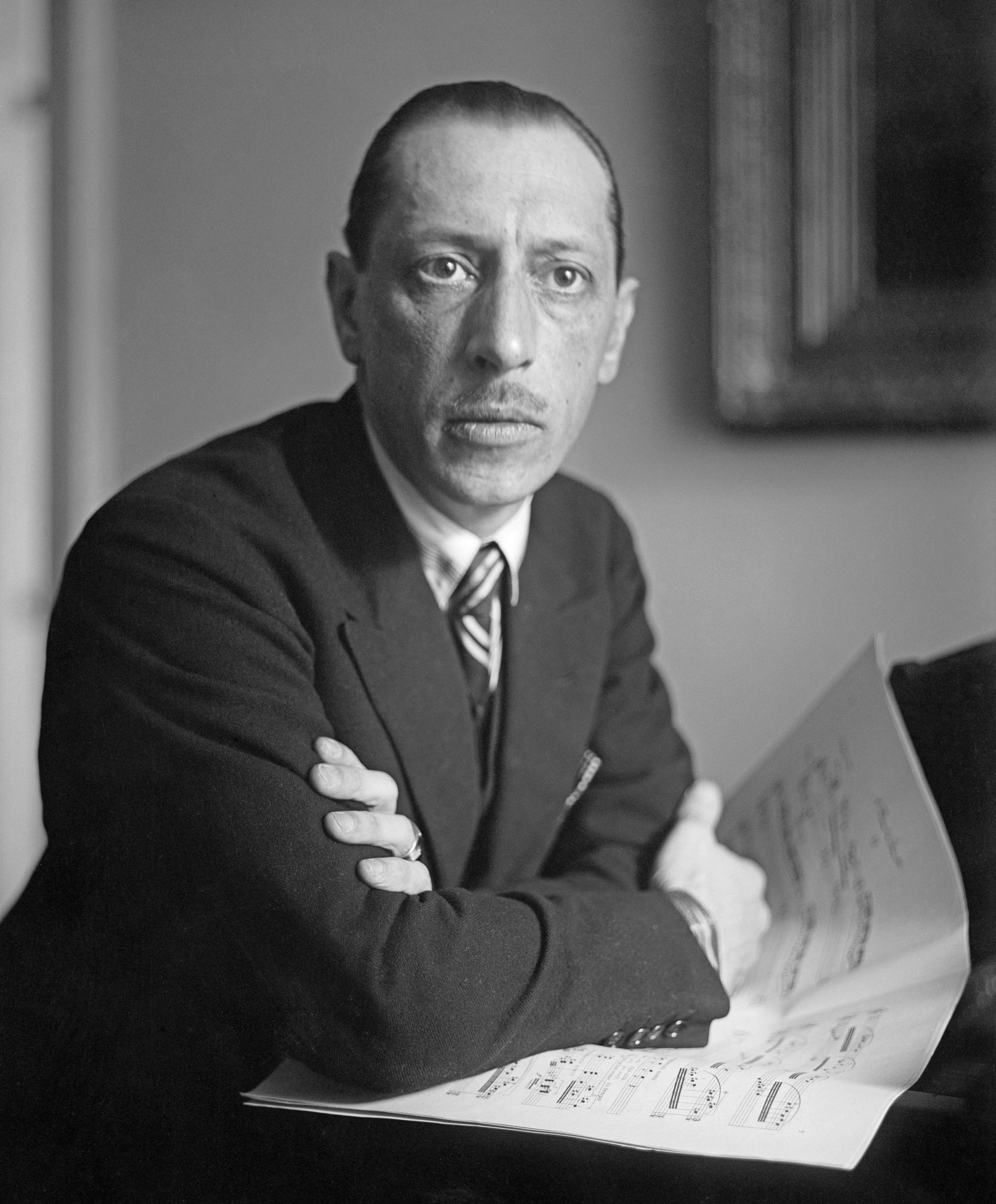
Igor Stravinsky

After the First World War, composers started returning to the past for inspiration and wrote works that drew elements (form, harmony, melody, structure) from it. This type of music thus became labelled neoclassicism. Igor Stravinsky (Pulcinella), Sergei Prokofiev (Classical Symphony), Ravel (Le Tombeau de Couperin), Manuel de Falla (El retablo de maese Pedro) and Paul Hindemith (Symphony: Mathis der Maler) all produced neoclassical works.

Italian composers such as Francesco Balilla Pratella and Luigi Russolo developed musical Futurism. This style often tried to recreate everyday sounds and place them in a "Futurist" context. The "Machine Music" of George Antheil (starting with his Second Sonata, "The Airplane") and Alexander Mosolov (most notoriously his Iron Foundry) developed out of this. The process of extending musical vocabulary by exploring all available tones was pushed further by the use of Microtones in works by Charles Ives, Julián Carrillo, Alois Hába, John Foulds, Ivan Wyschnegradsky, Harry Partch and Mildred Couper among many others. Microtones are those intervals that are smaller than a semitone; human voices and unfretted strings can easily produce them by going in between the "normal" notes, but other instruments will have more difficulty—the piano and organ have no way of producing them at all, aside from retuning and/or major reconstruction.

In the 1940s and 50s composers, notably Pierre Schaeffer, started to explore the application of technology to music in musique concrète. The term electroacoustic music was later coined to include all forms of music involving magnetic tape, computers, synthesizers, multimedia, and other electronic devices and techniques. Live electronic music uses live electronic sounds within a performance (as opposed to preprocessed sounds that are overdubbed during a performance), John Cage's Cartridge Music being an early example. Spectral music (Gérard Grisey and Tristan Murail) is a further development of electroacoustic music that uses analyses of sound spectra to create music. Cage, Berio, Boulez, Milton Babbitt, Luigi Nono and Edgard Varèse all wrote electroacoustic music.

From the early 1950s onwards, Cage introduced elements of chance into his music. Process music (Karlheinz Stockhausen Prozession, Aus den sieben Tagen; and Steve Reich Piano Phase, Clapping Music) explores a particular process which is essentially laid bare in the work. The term experimental music was coined by Cage to describe works that produce unpredictable results, according to the definition "an experimental action is one the outcome of which is not foreseen". The term is also used to describe music within specific genres that pushes against their boundaries or definitions, or else whose approach is a hybrid of disparate styles, or incorporates unorthodox, new, distinctly unique ingredients.

Important cultural trends often informed music of this period, romantic, modernist, neoclassical, postmodernist or otherwise. Igor Stravinsky and Sergei Prokofiev were particularly drawn to primitivism in their early careers, as explored in works such as The Rite of Spring and Chout. Other Russians, notably Dmitri Shostakovich, reflected the social impact of communism and subsequently had to work within the strictures of socialist realism in their music. Other composers, such as Benjamin Britten (War Requiem) and Michael Tippett, explored political themes in their works, albeit entirely at their own volition. Nationalism was also an important means of expression in the early part of the century. The culture of the United States of America, especially, began informing an American vernacular style of classical music, notably in the works of Charles Ives, John Alden Carpenter, and (later) George Gershwin. Folk music (Vaughan Williams' Five Variants of Dives and Lazarus, Gustav Holst's A Somerset Rhapsody) and jazz (Gershwin, Leonard Bernstein, Darius Milhaud's La création du monde) were also influential.

In the last quarter of the century, eclecticism and polystylism became important. These, as well as minimalism, New Complexity, and New Simplicity, are more fully explored in their respective articles.

== Styles ==
=== Romantic style ===
At the end of the 19th century (often called the Fin de siècle), the Romantic style was starting to break apart, moving along various parallel courses, such as Impressionism and Post-romanticism. In the 20th century, the different styles that emerged from the music of the previous century influenced composers to follow new trends, sometimes as a reaction to that music, sometimes as an extension of it, and both trends co-existed well into the 20th century. The former trends, such as Expressionism are discussed later.

In the early part of the 20th century, many composers wrote music which was an extension of 19th-century Romantic music, and traditional instrumental groupings such as the orchestra and string quartet remained the most typical. Traditional forms such as the symphony and concerto remained in use. Gustav Mahler and Jean Sibelius are examples of composers who took the traditional symphonic forms and reworked them. (See Romantic music.) Some writers hold that Schoenberg's work is squarely within the late-Romantic tradition of Wagner and Brahms and, more generally, that "the composer who most directly and completely connects late Wagner and the 20th century is Arnold Schoenberg".

=== Neoclassicism ===
Neoclassicism was a style cultivated between the two world wars, which sought to revive the balanced forms and clearly perceptible thematic processes of the 17th and 18th centuries, in a repudiation of what were seen as exaggerated gestures and formlessness of late Romanticism. Because these composers generally replaced the functional tonality of their models with extended tonality, modality, or atonality, the term is often taken to imply parody or distortion of the Baroque or Classical style. Famous examples include Prokofiev's Classical Symphony and Stravinsky's Pulcinella, Symphony of Psalms, and Concerto in E-flat "Dumbarton Oaks". Paul Hindemith (Symphony: Mathis der Maler), Darius Milhaud, Francis Poulenc (Concert champêtre), and Manuel de Falla (El retablo de maese Pedro, Harpsichord Concerto) also used this style. Maurice Ravel's Le Tombeau de Couperin is often seen as neo-baroque (an architectural term), though the distinction between the terms is not always made.

=== Jazz-influenced classical composition ===
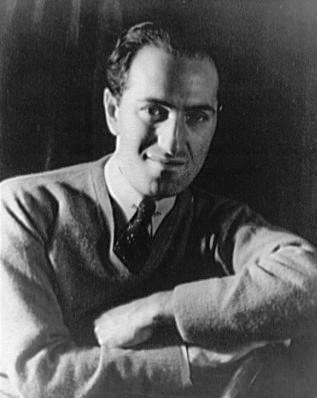
George Gershwin

A number of composers combined elements of the jazz idiom with classical compositional styles, notably:

- Malcolm Arnold in two clarinet concertos for Benny Goodman
- Leonard Bernstein in West Side Story and Candide
- Aaron Copland in his Piano Concerto and Clarinet Concerto
- George Gershwin in Rhapsody in Blue, An American in Paris, Three Preludes (Gershwin), and his many musicals
- Nikolai Kapustin in Suite in the Old Style and Twenty-Four Preludes for piano (1988) op.53
- Constant Lambert in The Rio Grande, and his Piano Sonata and the Concerto for piano and nine Instruments
- Darius Milhaud in La création du monde
- Maurice Ravel in his Piano Concerto and the Violin Sonata No. 2
- Gunther Schuller (third stream) in Transformation, Concertino, Abstraction, and Variants on a Theme of Thelonious Monk
- John Serry Sr. in his American Rhapsody and Concerto For Free Bass Accordion
- Dmitri Shostakovich in his Suite for Jazz Orchestra No. 1 and Suite for Jazz Orchestra No. 2
- Igor Stravinsky in his Ebony Concerto

== Movements ==
=== Impressionism ===
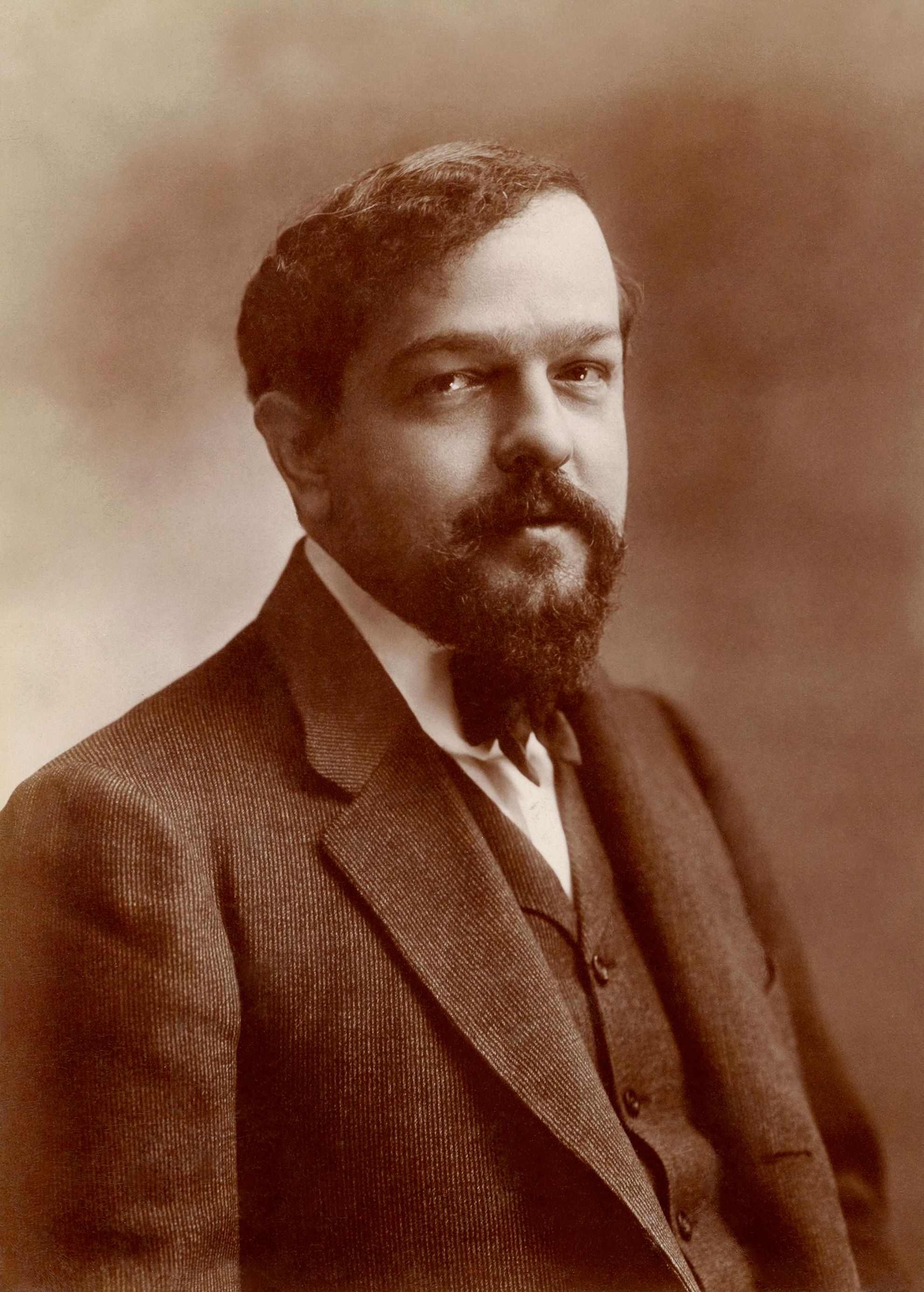
Claude Debussy, c. 1900

Impressionism started in France as a reaction, led by Claude Debussy, against the emotional exuberance and epic themes of German Romanticism exemplified by Wagner. In Debussy's view, art was a sensuous experience, rather than an intellectual or ethical one. He urged his countrymen to rediscover the French masters of the 18th century, for whom music was meant to charm, to entertain, and to serve as a "fantasy of the senses".

Other composers associated with impressionism include Maurice Ravel, Albert Roussel, Isaac Albéniz, Paul Dukas, Manuel de Falla, Charles Martin Loeffler, Charles Griffes, Frederick Delius, Ottorino Respighi, Cyril Scott and Karol Szymanowski. Many French composers continued impressionism's language through the 1920s and later, including Albert Roussel, Charles Koechlin, André Caplet, and, later, Olivier Messiaen. Composers from non-Western cultures, such as Tōru Takemitsu, and jazz musicians such as Duke Ellington, Gil Evans, Art Tatum, and Cecil Taylor also have been strongly influenced by the impressionist musical language.

=== Modernism ===
==== Futurism ====
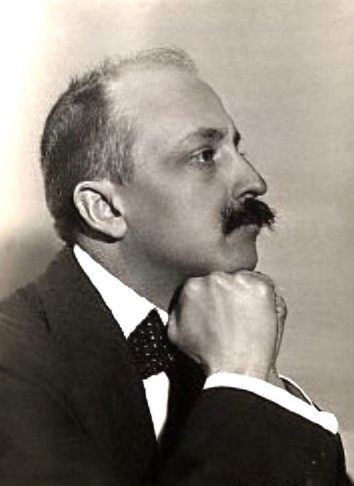
Filippo Tommaso Marinetti

At its conception, Futurism was an Italian artistic movement founded in 1909 by Filippo Tommaso Marinetti; it was quickly embraced by the Russian avant-garde. In 1913, the painter Luigi Russolo published a manifesto, L'arte dei rumori (The Art of Noises), calling for the incorporation of noises of every kind into music. In addition to Russolo, composers directly associated with this movement include the Italians Silvio Mix, Nuccio Fiorda, Franco Casavola, and Pannigi (whose 1922 Ballo meccanico included two motorcycles), and the Russians Artur Lourié, Mikhail Matyushin, and Nikolai Roslavets.

Though few of the futurist works of these composers are performed today, the influence of futurism on the later development of 20th-century music was enormous. Sergei Prokofiev, Maurice Ravel, Igor Stravinsky, Arthur Honegger, George Antheil, Leo Ornstein, and Edgard Varèse are among the notable composers in the first half of the century who were influenced by futurism. Characteristic features of later 20th-century music with origins in futurism include the prepared piano, integral serialism, extended vocal techniques, graphic notation, improvisation, and minimalism.

=== Free dissonance and experimentalism ===
In the early part of the 20th century, Charles Ives integrated American and European traditions as well as vernacular and church styles, while using innovative techniques in his rhythm, harmony, and form. His technique included the use of polytonality, polyrhythm, tone clusters, aleatoric elements, and quarter tones. Edgard Varèse wrote highly dissonant pieces that used unusual sonorities and futuristic, scientific-sounding names. He pioneered the use of new instruments and electronic resources (see below).

=== Expressionism ===
By the late 1920s, though many composers continued to write in a vaguely expressionist manner, it was being supplanted by the more impersonal style of the German Neue Sachlichkeit and neoclassicism. Because expressionism, like any movement that had been stigmatized by the Nazis, gained a sympathetic reconsideration following World War II, expressionist music resurfaced in works by composers such as Hans Werner Henze, Pierre Boulez, Peter Maxwell Davies, Wolfgang Rihm, and Bernd Alois Zimmermann.

=== Postmodern music ===
Postmodernism is a reaction to modernism, but it can also be viewed as a response to a deep-seated shift in societal attitude. According to this latter view, postmodernism began when historic (as opposed to personal) optimism turned to pessimism, at the latest by 1930.

John Cage is a prominent figure in 20th-century music, claimed with some justice both for modernism and postmodernism because the complex intersections between modernism and postmodernism are not reducible to simple schemata. His influence steadily grew during his lifetime. He often uses elements of chance: Imaginary Landscape No. 4 for 12 radio receivers, and Music of Changes for piano. Sonatas and Interludes (1946–48) is composed for a prepared piano: a normal piano whose timbre is dramatically altered by carefully placing various objects inside the piano in contact with the strings. Currently, postmodernism includes composers who react against the avant-garde and experimental styles of the late 20th century such as Astor Piazzolla, Argentina, and Miguel del Águila, USA.

=== Minimalism ===
In the later 20th century, composers such as La Monte Young, Arvo Pärt, Philip Glass, Terry Riley, Steve Reich, and John Adams began to explore what is now called minimalism, in which the work is stripped down to its most fundamental features; the music often features repetition and iteration. An early example is Terry Riley's In C (1964), an aleatoric work in which short phrases are chosen by the musicians from a set list and played an arbitrary number of times, while the note C is repeated in eighth notes (quavers) behind them.

Steve Reich's works Piano Phase (1967, for two pianos), and Drumming (1970–71, for percussion, female voices and piccolo) employ the technique called phasing in which a phrase played by one player maintaining a constant pace is played simultaneously by another but at a slightly quicker pace. This causes the players to go "out of phase" with each other and the performance may continue until they come back in phase. According to Reich, "Drumming is the final expansion and refinement of the phasing process, as well as the first use of four new techniques: (1) the process of gradually substituting beats for rests (or rests for beats); (2) the gradual changing of timbre while rhythm and pitch remain constant; (3) the simultaneous combination of instruments of different timbre; and (4) the use of the human voice to become part of the musical ensemble by imitating the exact sound of the instruments”. Drumming was Reich's final use of the phasing technique.

Philip Glass's 1 + 1 (1968) employs the additive process in which short phrases are slowly expanded. La Monte Young's Compositions 1960 employs very long tones, exceptionally high volumes and extra-musical techniques such as "draw a straight line and follow it" or "build a fire". Michael Nyman argues that minimalism was a reaction to and made possible by both serialism and indeterminism. (See also experimental music.)

== Techniques ==
=== Atonality and twelve-tone technique ===
Arnold Schoenberg is one of the most significant figures in 20th-century music. While his early works were in a late Romantic style influenced by Wagner (Verklärte Nacht, 1899), this evolved into an atonal idiom in the years before the First World War (Drei Klavierstücke in 1909 and Pierrot lunaire in 1912). In 1921, after several years of research, he developed the twelve-tone technique of composition, which he first described privately to his associates in 1923. His first large-scale work entirely composed using this technique was the Wind Quintet, Op. 26, written in 1923–24. Later examples include the Variations for Orchestra, Op. 31 (1926–28), the Third and Fourth String Quartets (1927 and 1936, respectively), the Violin Concerto (1936) and Piano Concerto (1942). In later years, he intermittently returned to a more tonal style (Kammersymphonie no. 2, begun in 1906 but completed only in 1939; Variations on a Recitative for organ in 1941).

He taught Anton Webern and Alban Berg and these three composers are often referred to as the principal members of the Second Viennese School (Haydn, Mozart and Beethoven—and sometimes Schubert—being regarded as the First Viennese School in this context). Webern wrote works using a rigorous twelve-tone method and influenced the development of total serialism. Berg, like Schoenberg, employed twelve-tone technique within a late-romantic or post-romantic style (Violin Concerto, which quotes a Bach Choral and uses Classical form). He wrote two major operas (Wozzeck and Lulu).

== Electronic music ==
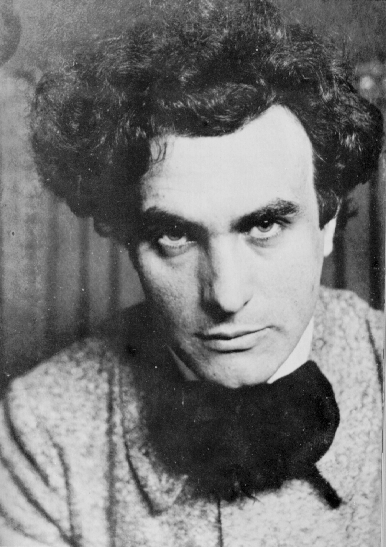
Edgard Varèse, one of the pioneers of electronic music

The development of recording technology made all sounds available for potential use as musical material. Electronic music generally refers to a repertory of art music developed in the 1950s in Europe, Japan, and the Americas. The increasing availability of magnetic tape in this decade provided composers with a medium which allowed recording sounds and then manipulating them in various ways. All electronic music depends on transmission via loudspeakers, but there are two broad types: acousmatic music, which exists only in recorded form meant for loudspeaker listening, and live electronic music, in which electronic apparatus are used to generate, transform, or trigger sounds during performance by musicians using voices, traditional instruments, electro-acoustic instruments, or other devices. Beginning in 1957, computers became increasingly important in this field. When the source material was acoustical sounds from the everyday world, the term musique concrète was used; when the sounds were produced by electronic generators, it was designated electronic music.

After the 1950s, the term "electronic music" came to be used for both types. Sometimes such electronic music was combined with more conventional instruments, Edgard Varèse's Déserts (1954), Stockhausen's Hymnen (1969), Claude Vivier's Wo bist du Licht! (1981), and Mario Davidovsky's series of Synchronisms (1963–2006) are notable examples.

== Other notable 20th-century composers ==
Some prominent 20th-century composers are not associated with any widely recognised school of composition. The list below includes some of those, as well as notable classifiable composers not mentioned earlier in this article:

- Samuel Adler
- Louis Andriessen
- Béla Bartók
- Havergal Brian
- Elliott Carter
- Carlos Chávez
- Edward Elgar
- George Enescu
- Gabriel Fauré
- Morton Feldman
- Brian Ferneyhough
- Alberto Ginastera
- Henryk Górecki
- Sofia Gubaidulina
- Alan Hovhaness
- Aram Khachaturian
- György Ligeti
- Witold Lutosławski
- Bruno Maderna
- Bohuslav Martinů
- Carl Nielsen
- Krzysztof Penderecki
- Francis Poulenc
- Giacomo Puccini
- Sergei Rachmaninoff
- Alfred Schnittke
- Kaikhosru Shapurji Sorabji
- Patric Standford
- Mikis Theodorakis
- Michael Tippett
- Joan Tower
- Ralph Vaughan Williams
- Heitor Villa-Lobos
- William Walton
- Judith Weir
- Iannis Xenakis

== See also ==
- Contemporary classical music
