= Requiem for Khojaly =

Mass for the dead by Aleksandr Chaykovsky

Requiem Khojaly
- by Alexander Tchaikovsky
- Native name: Azerbaijani: Xocalı rekviyemi
- Year: 2012
- Genre: Requiem
- Written: 2012, Moscow
- Dedication: Khojaly massacre
- Performed: 7 August 2012, Gabala, Gabala International Music Festival
- Instrumental: Tar, Piano, Violin, Cello

Premiere
- Date: 7 August 2012
- Location: Gabala, Gabala International Music Festival
- Conductor: Yuri Bashmet
- Performers: Farhad Badalbeyli, Dmitry Yablonsky, Sahib Pashazade

Khojaly Requiem (Azerbaijani: Xocalı rekviyemi) is a work of Alexander Tchaikovsky, a modern Russian composer, pianist, teacher and musical public figure, People's Artist of Russia, professor at the Moscow State Conservatory, nephew of Boris Alexandrovich Tchaikovsky, dedicated to Khojaly massacre. The piece was funded with the support of the Heydar Aliyev Foundation.

== History of creation ==
Khojaly's Requiem was written by Alexander Tchaikovsky specifically for the traditional festival held annually in the Azerbaijani city of Gabala. The work tells not only about the tragedy in Khojaly, but is also dedicated to the people of many countries who survived the horrors of war.

The author himself said the following about the history of writing his work:

Firstly, I collected information about Khojaly, watched various video frames, listened to Azerbaijani music on disks and, using all this, wrote this work.

According to Tchaikovsky, by writing this requiem, he demonstrated the musicians' support to those people in many countries of the world who survived the horrors of war.

When this music is performed tonight, all festival participants, as well as the world community, will understand the state of people who survived the grief of war. Hope no more human blood and tears will be shed.

== Composition ==
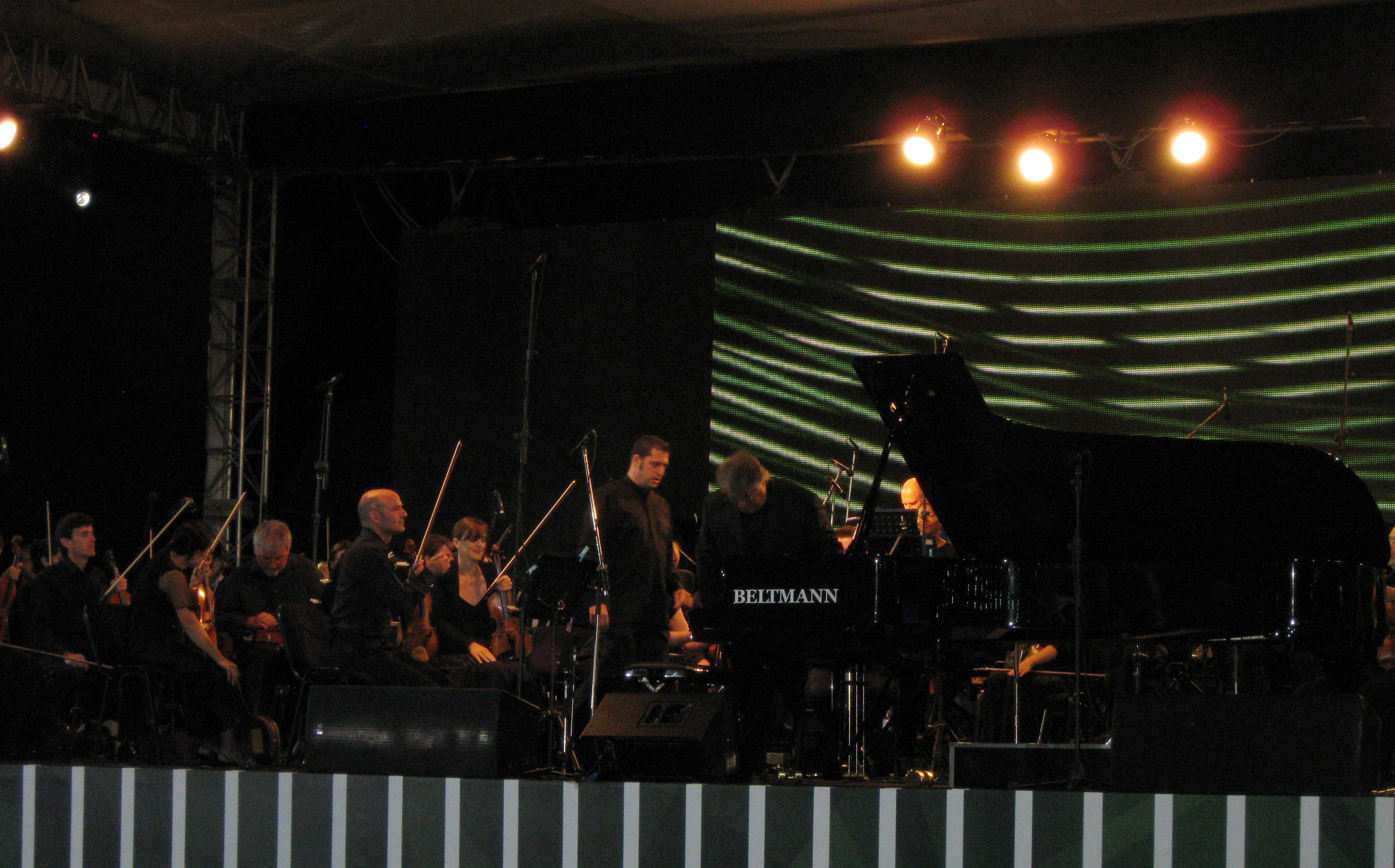
Chamber orchestra on the Gabala's concert stage

Alexander Tchaikovsky actively uses in his composition mugham, the oldest Azerbaijani genre of oral musical tradition.

== Concert premiere ==
The premiere of the requiem took place on 7 August 2012 on the final day of the IV Gabala International Music Festival. The piece was performed by the "Moscow Soloists" chamber orchestra.

In the concert, conducted by the artistic director of the State Symphony Orchestra "New Russia", and the founder of the chamber orchestra "Moscow Soloists", Yuri Bashmet, also took part the People's Artist of Azerbaijan and the USSR Farhad Badalbeyli (piano), the Russian-American conductor and cellist, the son of the pianist Oksana Yablonskaya and the oboist Albert Zayonts - Dmitry Yablonsky (cello) and the Honored Artist of Azerbaijan Sahib Pashazade (tar).

In his opening speech, Alexander Tchaikovsky noted that the requiem was born with the support of the Heydar Aliyev Foundation and at the suggestion of his closest friend Dmitry Yablonsky.
