= Khojaly massacre in popular culture =

There is a number of works in which people have mentioned or commemorated the Khojaly massacre in popular culture.

== Literature ==
Year	Book name	Author	Notes
2013	Genocide Almanax	Ireli Public Union	
2011	Peacemaking: From Practice to Theory	Susan Allen Nan, Andrea Bartoli and Zachariah Cherian Mampilly	
2011	The Khojaly Trauma and Mutalibov’s Fall	Svante Cornell	
2010	The Caucasus: An Introduction	Thomas de Waal	
2004	Black Garden: Armenia and Azerbaijan Through Peace and War	Thomas de Waal	
2000	Azerbaijan: A Quest for Identity	Charles van der Leeuw	Part of Caucasus World series.
2000	Small Nations and Great Powers: A Study of Ethnopolitical Conflict in the Caucasus	Svante Cornell	Part of Caucasus World series.
1992	Eyewitness Account From the Following Day	Thomas Goltz	
1992	Karabakh’s Bloody Maelstrom – A Cry for Khojaly	Yuri Pompeyev	

== Films ==
=== Documentary films ===
- 2011 – Refugee: a long journey of Anar Yusubov (dir. Cem Oguz)
- 2012 – Infinite Corridor / Sonu olmayan dəhliz (dir. Richardas Lopaitis)

=== Fictional films ===
- 1993 – The Squall (dir. Jeyhun Mirzayev)
- 1993 – Haray (dir. Oruj Gurbanov)
- 2012 – Xoca (dir. Vahid Mustafayev)
- 2012 – Dolu (dir. Elkhan Jafarov)

== Music ==
A list of musical works dedicated to the Khojaly Massacre and related events:

Year	Composition	Artist	Notes
2012	Requiem for Khojaly	Alexander Tchaikovsky	a symphony
2013	Khojaly 613	Pierre Thilloy	a symphony
2015	Broken Dreams	Nigar Jamal	

== Sports ==
On 11 May 2014, Turkish footballer Arda Turan of Atlético Madrid was announced as a goodwill ambassador for Khojaly Massacre. Turan's ambassador activities are aimed to raise awareness about this issue and promoting world peace.
