= Dmitry Yablonsky =

Soviet-born American-Israeli classical cellist and conductor (born 1962)

Dmitry Yablonsky Дмитрий Яблонский
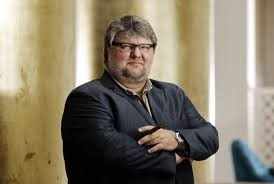
- Yablonsky in 2014

Background information
- Born: 1962 (age 63–64); Moscow, Soviet Union
- Genre: Classical
- Occupations: Cellist, Conductor
- Instrument: Cello
- Years active: 1971-present
- Labels: Naxos Records, Chandos Records

Dmitry Albertovich Yablonsky (Russian: Дмитрий Альбертович Яблонский; born 1962) is a Soviet-born American-israeli classical cellist and conductor, who was educated at the Juilliard School of Music and Yale University.

== Early life and education ==
Yablonsky was born in Moscow into a musical family, his mother is famed pianist Oxana Yablonskaya and his father is Albert Zayonts, who was solo oboe of the Radio and Television orchestra in Moscow for 30 years.

Yablonsky began playing the cello when he was 5 years old and was accepted into the Central Music School for gifted children. At the age of 9 he gave his orchestral debut playing Haydn's cello concerto in C major. In Russia, Yablonsky studied with Stefan Kalianov, who was Mstislav Rostropovich's assistant and Isaak Buravsky, who for many years was solo cello of the Bolshoi Theatre Orchestra. Before immigrating to the United States he performed on many occasions in Moscow and many cities of the former Soviet Union. Leaving the Soviet Union was not that easy in the 1970s, and the visa application was first refused and it took a few years and many signatures from many well known personalities such as Leonard Bernstein and Katharine Hepburn to convince the Soviet authorities to issue a visa to allow his mother to leave the country. She originally wanted to emigrate to Israel like many so-called refuseniks at the time; due to her emigration application, she was dismissed from her job at the Moscow Conservatory and Yablonsky was ostracized by school staff.

Upon arrival in New York in 1977, he auditioned to the Juilliard School of Music and was accepted to study with Lorne Munroe, the principal cellist of the New York Philharmonic Orchestra.

In the summer of 1979, at the age of 16, Yablonsky was accepted to participate at Marlboro Music Festival in Vermont and was the youngest participant that summer. He played for David Soyer, cellist of Guarneri Quartet, who offered Yablonsky a place at the Curtis Institute of Music.

In the summer of 1980, Yablonsky met Aldo Parisot, distinguished cellist and professor at Yale University where Yablonsky spent 4 years. At Yale he became interested in conducting after meeting Otto Werner Muller, conducting professor.

== Career ==
After graduating from Yale, Yablonsky spent two years in the artist diploma program at the Juilliard School of Music with Zara Nelsova. During these years he played with János Starker, Mstislav Rostropovich, André Navarra, Maurice Gendron and many more.

During one festival, which took place in Camerino, Italy he was asked to replace a conductor, who cancelled at the last minute, in conducting the Stravinsky Octet with members of Orchestra dell'Accademia Nazionale di Santa Cecilia of Rome. This was quite challenging as he had never conducted before. Yablonsky was 26 years old and that was his conducting debut.

As a cellist he has played all over the world in venues such as Carnegie Hall, La Scala, the Moscow Great Hall, St. Petersburg Philharmonic Hall, Taiwan National Hall, Théâtre Mogador, Cité de la Musique, the Louvre and many others. Some chamber music partners have included Viktor Tretiakov, Leif Ove Andsnes, Yuri Bashmet and many more.

For several years Yablonsky was Principal Guest Conductor of the Moscow Philharmonic Orchestra and has conducted many orchestras all over the world including: the Belgian National Orchestra, Catania Opera Orchestra, Netherlands North Orchestra, Holland symphonia, Bologna Chamber Orchestra, Taiwan National Orchestra, Russian State Orchestra, Orchestre national d'Île-de-France, Israel Symphony Orchestra, Royal Philharmonic Orchestra.

He has collaborated with soloists such as Montserrat Caballé, Roberto Alagna, and Olga Borodina.

He has organized many festivals all over the world including the Gabala Festival in Azerbaijan, the Wandering Stars Festival, which takes place in different countries of the world each year. such as Israel, Italy, Russia, the US and more.

Yablonsky is Co-Artistic Director of Gabala International Music Festival in Gabala, Azerbaijan. He is an academician of the Independent Academy of Aesthetics and Liberal Arts in Moscow, and also teaches cello at the Baku Academy of Music, since 2012 he is the Principal Guest Conductor of State Symphony Orchestra.

Yablonsky has two cellos, which he uses for his cello concerts, a Joseph Filius Andrea Guarneri and a Matteo Goffriller.

On March 1, 2015 he performed with the Jerusalem Symphony Orchestra in a program including music from the baroque, classical, and romantic periods.

Yablonsky is also a conductor of the Ukrainian-based 'Kyiv Virtuosos' orchestra.

Yablonsky is Online Master Teacher at iClassical Academy with whom he has recorded several online Masterclasses.

In 2016, he emigrated to Israel with his mother. Since that time, he has been teaching at the Buchmann-Mehta School of Music at Tel Aviv University; he is head of international relations at the latter institution.

== Recordings ==
Pamyati Suvorova (To the Memory of Suvorov) (1900)
Performed by
Russian Philharmonic Orchestra
Yablonsky, Dmitry (Conductor)
Courtesy of NAXOS

The piano trio recording for Erato/Warner with Vadim Repin and Boris Berezovsky has won numerous awards. He has transcribed and edited works for cello, which was released by International Music Company and Dover Publications. His recording of all 40 Popper etudes for solo cello was released by Naxos records in the fall of 2008 to a great critical acclaim.

Yablonsky has made more than 70 recordings as conductor and cellist for Naxos, Erato-Warner, Chandos, Belair Music, Sonora, and Connoisseur Society. Some of his recordings have won many prizes, such as the Berlin critic prize. His recording of Shostakovich's works containing his Jazz Suite No. 1, Suite for Variety Orchestra No. 1, and The Bolt suite, was on the charts in the UK and the US. He was nominated for the Grammy Award for Best Instrumental Soloist(s) Performance (with orchestra) at the 50th Annual Grammy Awards in 2008 as conductor of the Russian Philharmonic Orchestra in a recording of Rózsa's Violin Concerto, Op. 24.
