= Gabala International Music Festival =

Gabala International Music Festival Qəbələ Musiqi Festivalı
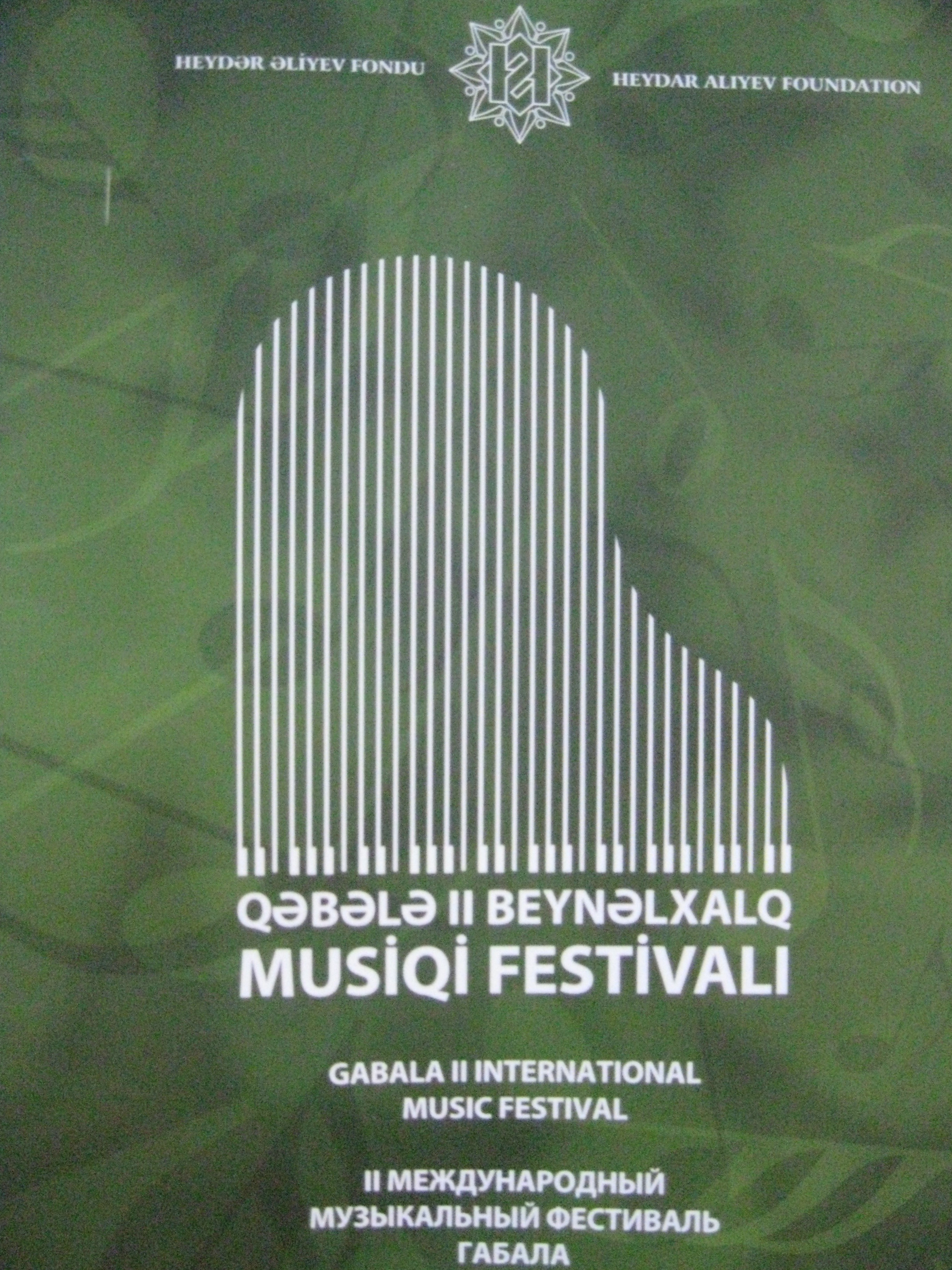
- Country: Azerbaijan
- Established: 2009
- Website: http://www.gabalainternationalmusicfestival.com

Gabala International Music Festival is an annual festival of classical music held every summer beginning in 2009 in Gabala, Azerbaijan. The festival is organised with the support of Heydar Aliyev Foundation at the initiative of the rector of the Baku Academy of Music Farhad Badalbeyli and conductor Dmitri Yablonski. At this festival, musicians perform in the open air. Participants have included musicians from Europe, the US and Israel, as well as musicians from republics of the former USSR. In 2009, a contest of young pianists was held at the same time with the musical festival. Jazz and mugham evenings were held along with classical music concerts. In 2010, the festival was held on August. General director of UNESCO Irina Bokova was in the opening ceremony of the festival. The festival began with the performance of overture from Uzeyir Hajibeyov's "Koroglu" opera as in 2009. Opening ceremony of the festival was charged to Royal Philharmonic Orchestra. Such musicians as Dmitri Yablonski, Yuri Bashmet, Khloe Khanslip and other Azerbaijani and foreign musicians took part in the festival. In 2011, the festival lasted from July 15 to August 5.

== History ==
Gabala International Music Festival is organized for the first time in 2009, in the city of Gabala. Performances were held by famous musicians from 16 countries such as USA, France, Israel, Mexico, Cuba, Poland, Russia, Italy, Spain and so forth. In 2010, the festival was held in August and the general director of UNESCO Irina Bokova attended in the opening ceremony of the festival. The festival started with the overture from Uzeyir Hajibeyov's "Koroglu" opera that was performed by Royal Philharmonic Orchestra and conducted by professor at the Juilliard School of Music in New York City Oksana Yablonskaya and Azerbaijani conductor Rauf Abdullayev.

In 2011, the festival got started on July 15 and finished on August 5. There was the contest of young pianists which was held in parallel with the musical festival. 21–22 July was the final of Gabala Piano Competition accompanied by Azerbaijan State Symphony Orchestra. On the fifth of August, the closing concert took place with the performance of Orchestra of New Russia. Boris Berezovsky (in piano) and Dmitry Yablonsky (as conductor) took part in the festival.

The 4th Gabala International Music Festival was held between July 22 and August 5, 2012. The 4th festival opened with a concert dedicated the 70th anniversary of USSR People’s Artist Muslim Magomayev on 24 July 2012. There were other jubilees dedicated to maestro Niyazi (100) and Fikrat Amirov (90). The festival brought together 350 musicians from 10 countries. The music pieces in the concert were consisted of the works of well-known composers, including Rachmaninoff, Strauss, Brahms, Schumann, Uzeyir Hajibeyli, Tofig Guliyev and Vagif Mustafazade. The State Symphonic Orchestra named after U. Hajibeyli, Azerbaijan State Choir Capella, Music Academy Orchestra (Azerbaijan), Royal Philharmonic Orchestra, and Moscow Soloists Chamber Orchestra performed in the festival.

The 5th Gabala International Music Festival was held from July 24 to August 6, 2013. Musicians from 11 countries Jerusalem Symphony Orhchestra, New Russia State Symphony Orchestra, the Azerbaijan State Symphonic Orchestra, “Septeto Santiaguero” jazz band, Oksana Yablonskaya soloists Idil Biret, Vadim Repin, Sergey Leyferkus, Farhad Badalbeyli, Dmitri Yablonski and others made a personal contribution to the concert. Within the 5th Gabala International Music Festival a chamber music evening was organized to the memory of Sergey Rahmaninov. The closing ceremony performances were held by New Russia State Symphony Orchestra conducted by Dmitry Yablonsky.

The 6th Gabala International Music Festival took place between July 23 and August 1, 2014. Along with traditional musician and orchestras, the Johannesburg Philharmonic Orchestra, Vienna Chamber Music Ensemble and the representatives from different nations and, such as, USA, Ukraine, Russia, Spain, Israel, and Azerbaijan participated in the festival. Johannesburg Philharmonic Orchestra, on August 1, played sixteen different compositions from the works of P. Mascagni, G. Verdi, M. Magomayev, G. Rossini, etc.

The 7th Gabala International Music Festival was held on July 25–31, 2015. The festival was accompanied by Chamber orchestra of Weiner Academy (Austria), “Orchestra Filarmonica Italiana”, Kara Karaev State Chamber Orchestra of Azerbaijan, “Moscow Virtuosi”, Dubrovnik - Trio Guitar. The opening concert of the VII Gabala International Music Festival started with the performances of “Orchestra Filarmonica Italiana” on July 25. In the closing concert, Moscow Virtuosi Chamber Orchestra played F. Amirov’s “Nizami” symphony, A. Piazzola’s “4 seasons in Buenos Aires” and other pieces of classical music conducted by Dmitry Yablonsky (conductor).

The 8th Gabala International Music Festival was organized between July 30 and August 5, 2016. Musicians, art collectives, soloists, conductors from Azerbaijan, Austria, Bulgaria, Russia, Turkey, Ukraine, USA, Italy, France, Spain, Israel, Lithuania and Cuba attended in the festival. The Azerbaijan State Symphonic Orchestra named after Uzeyir Hajibeyli, Orchestr Wiener Akademie, Spain’s Suite Española, mugam and folkloric trio from Greece ensemble, Cuban Ensemble “Jóvenes Clásicos del Son”, Kiev Virtuosi and Israeli composer, conductor and pianist Gil Shohat and others’ performances constituted a great proportion of concert programme.

The 9th Gabala International Music Festival was held from July 29 to August 3, 2017. Student Symphonic Orchestra of Baku Music Academy named after Uzeyir Hajibayli, the Symphonic Orchestra of the Azerbaijan State Academic Opera and Ballet Theater, the British Femusa Chamber Orchestra, and others performed sequentially. Along with Farhad Badalbeyli, Murad Adigozalzadeh, Azer Rzazade, Isfar Sarabski and other Azerbaijanis, Janna Gandelman (Israel), Michael Sladkin (USA), Dmitry Yablonski (USA), Canluicci Sartori (Italy), Mojca Zlobko Vajgl (Slovenia), Nomeda Kazlaus (Lithuania) and other countries' musicians took part in the festival.

The 10th Gabala International Music Festival took place between July 30 and August 7, 2018. Chamber concert was held on July 30, in the framework of the project "Youth Support", but July 31 was selected officially as the opening ceremony date. During the festival, Gabala welcomed several orchestras such as Tbilisi City Hall Jazz Orchestra "BIG-BAND (Georgia), Jóvenes Clásicos Del Son (Cuba), Baku Chamber Orchestra (Azerbaijan), Budapest Gypsy Band (Hungary), and Jerusalem Symphony Orchestra (Israel). The festival had several parts. Mugham and multipiano music nights were organized on the 2nd of August. On August 5, the chamber music might was dedicated to the 100th anniversary of Azerbaijani composer Gara Garayev. The works of Gara Garayev's “Quartettino” for the string quartet and “Sonata for violin and piano” was performed for the first time in the concert. The final concert of chamber music and the closing ceremony of the festival took place at the Gabala Culture Center with the performances Jerusalem Symphony Orchestra.

== Concept ==
Gabala International Music Festivals of (2009-2018) featured international contest of young pianists, concerts of mugham, as well as classic, chamber, jazz, flamenco, vocal music, etc. Every year starting from 2009, musicians from different countries, world-known symphonic and philharmonic orchestras performs in the festival.

== Artistic Directors ==
Since 2009, Farhad Badalbeyli is an artistic director of Gabala International Music Festival. Dimitri Yablonsky (music director of Kiev Virtuosi and Conductor Laureate of Jerusalem Symphony Orchestra) is also an organizer of the festival.

== Photos ==
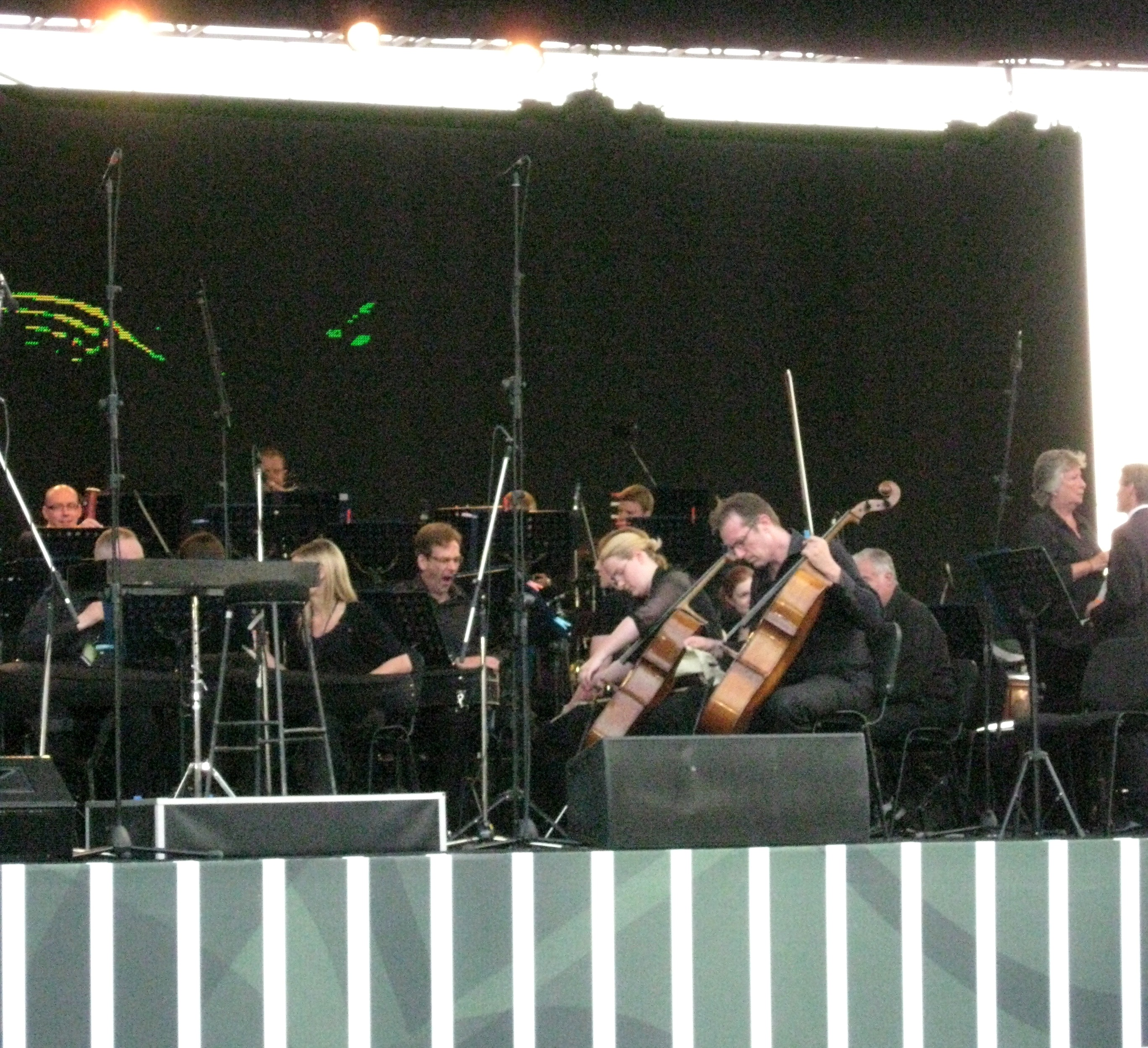

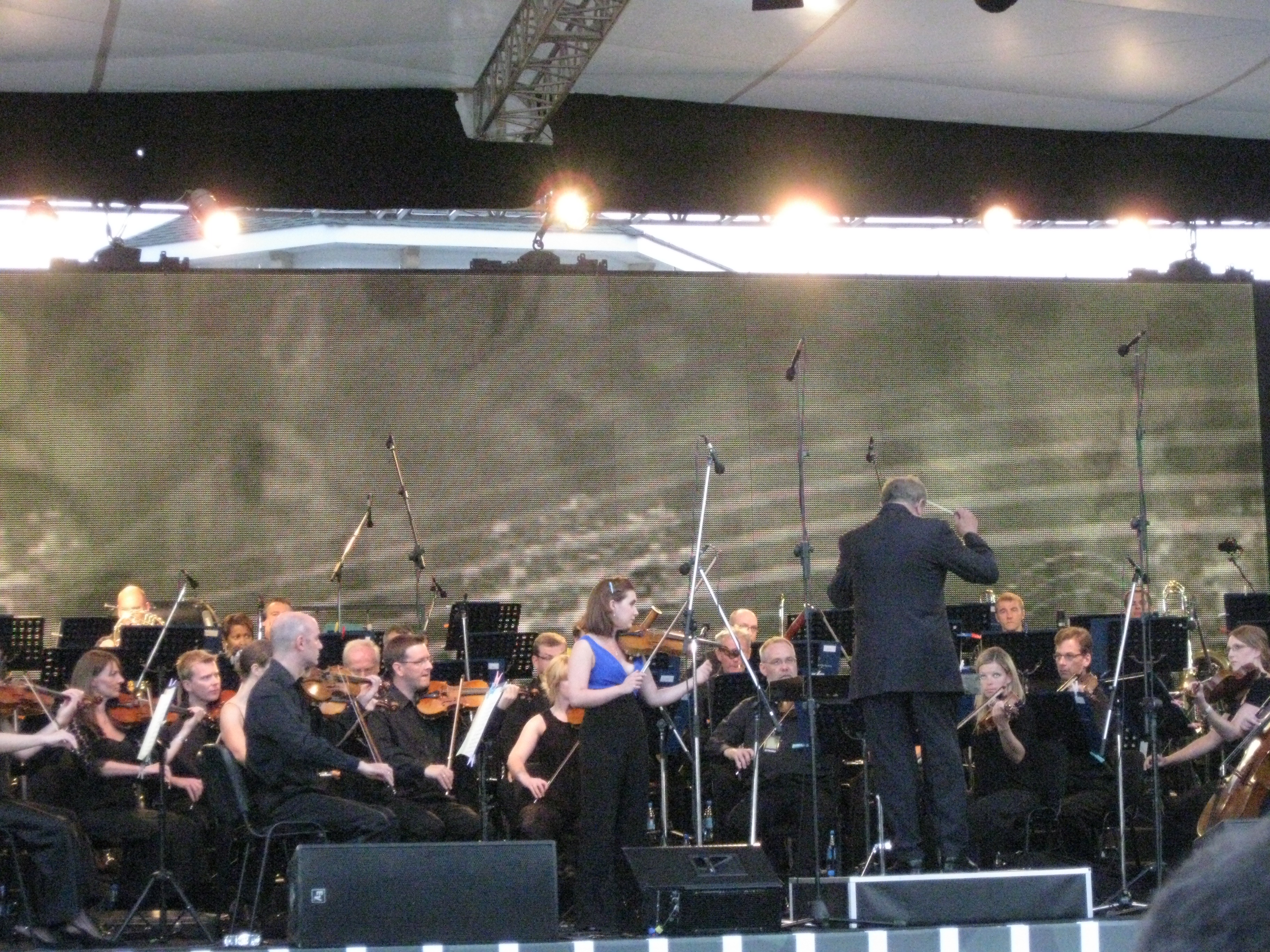

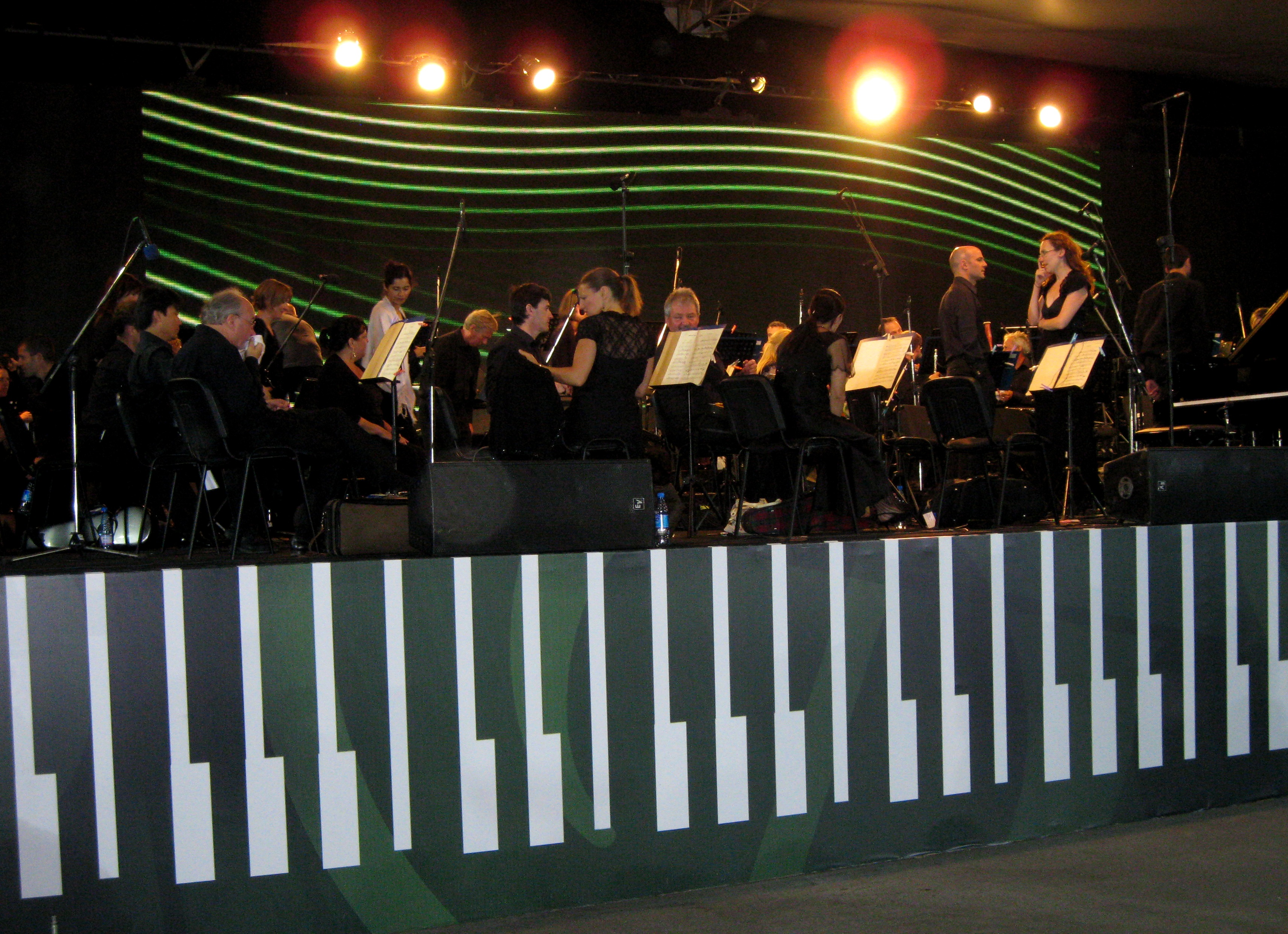

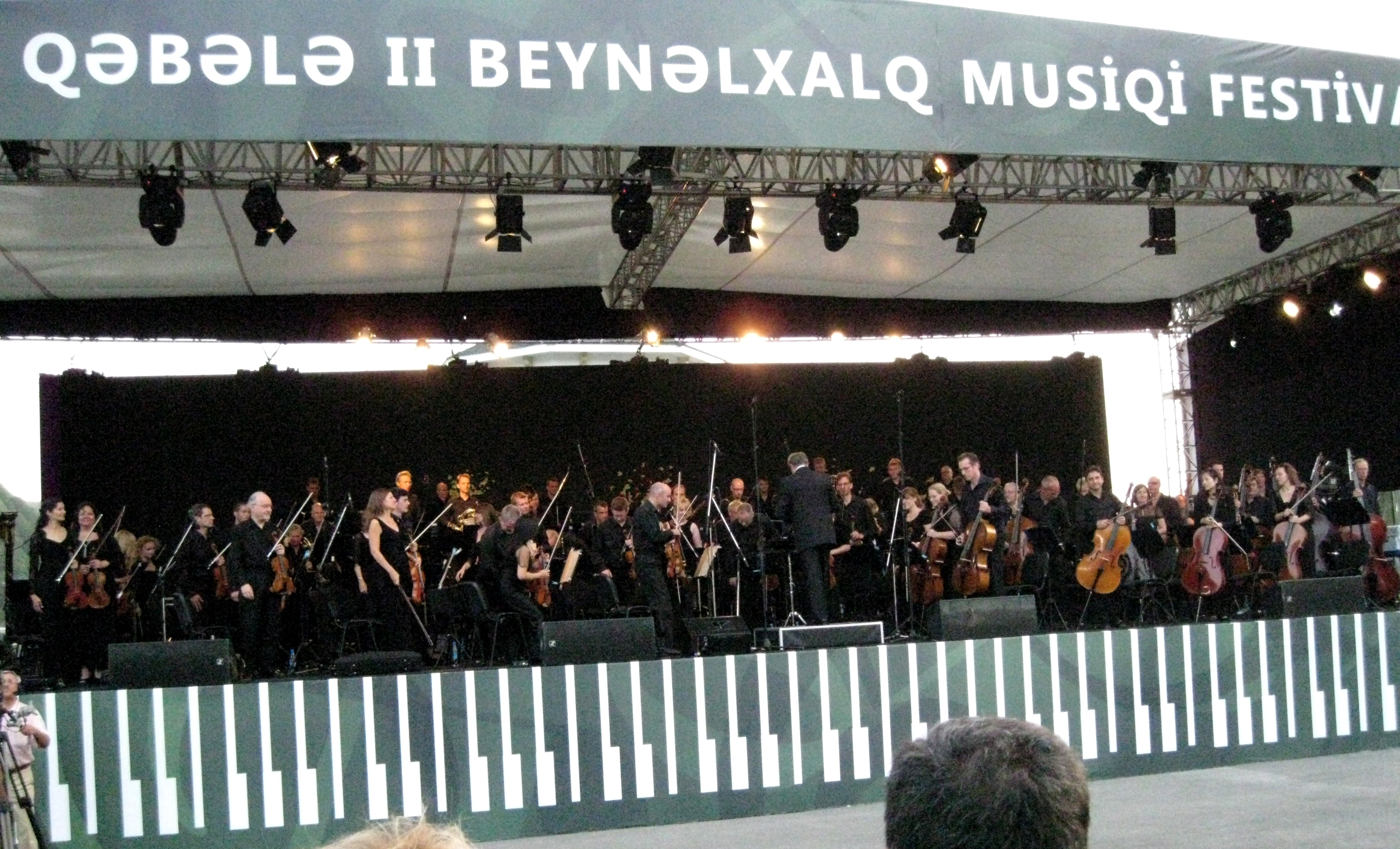

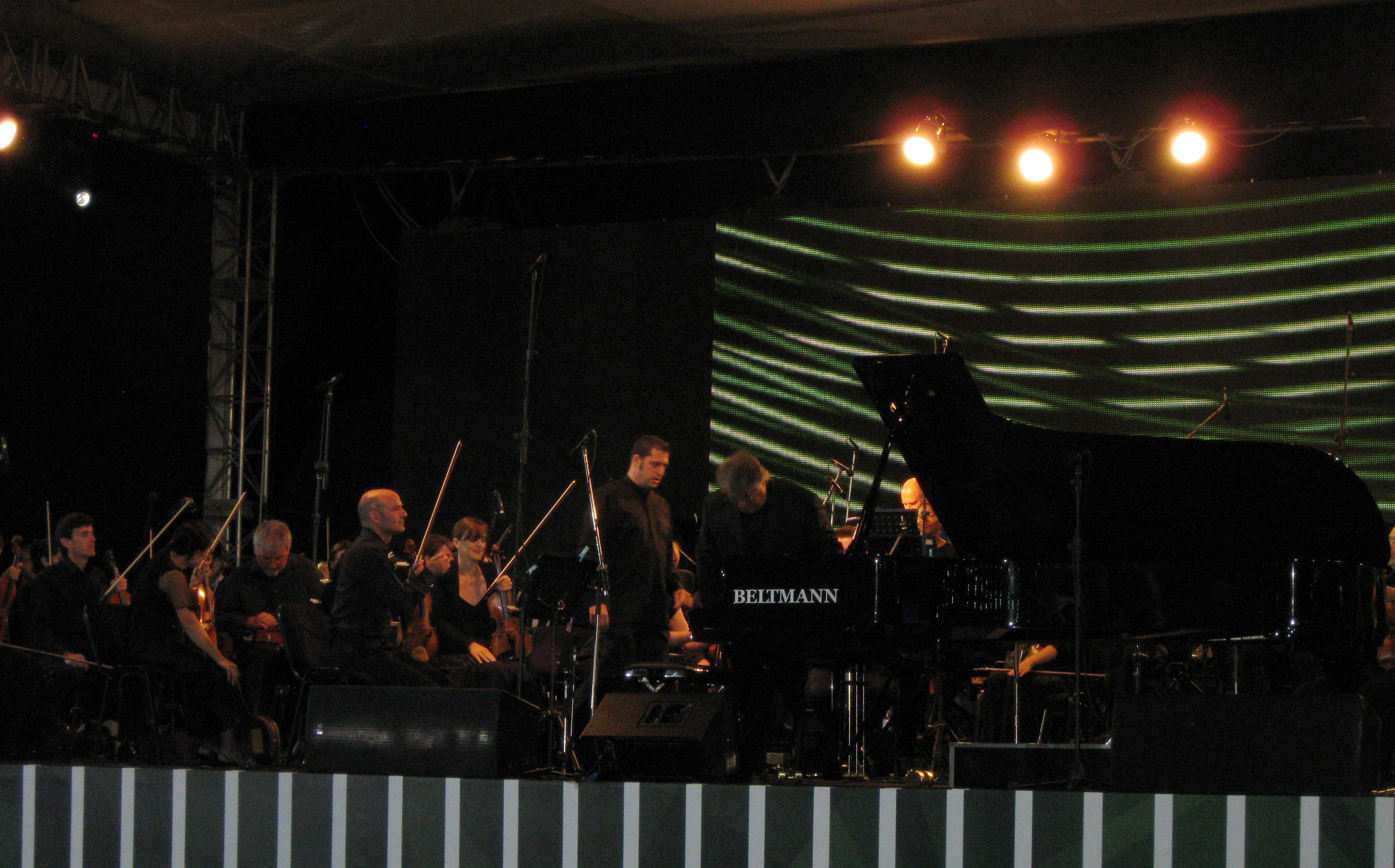

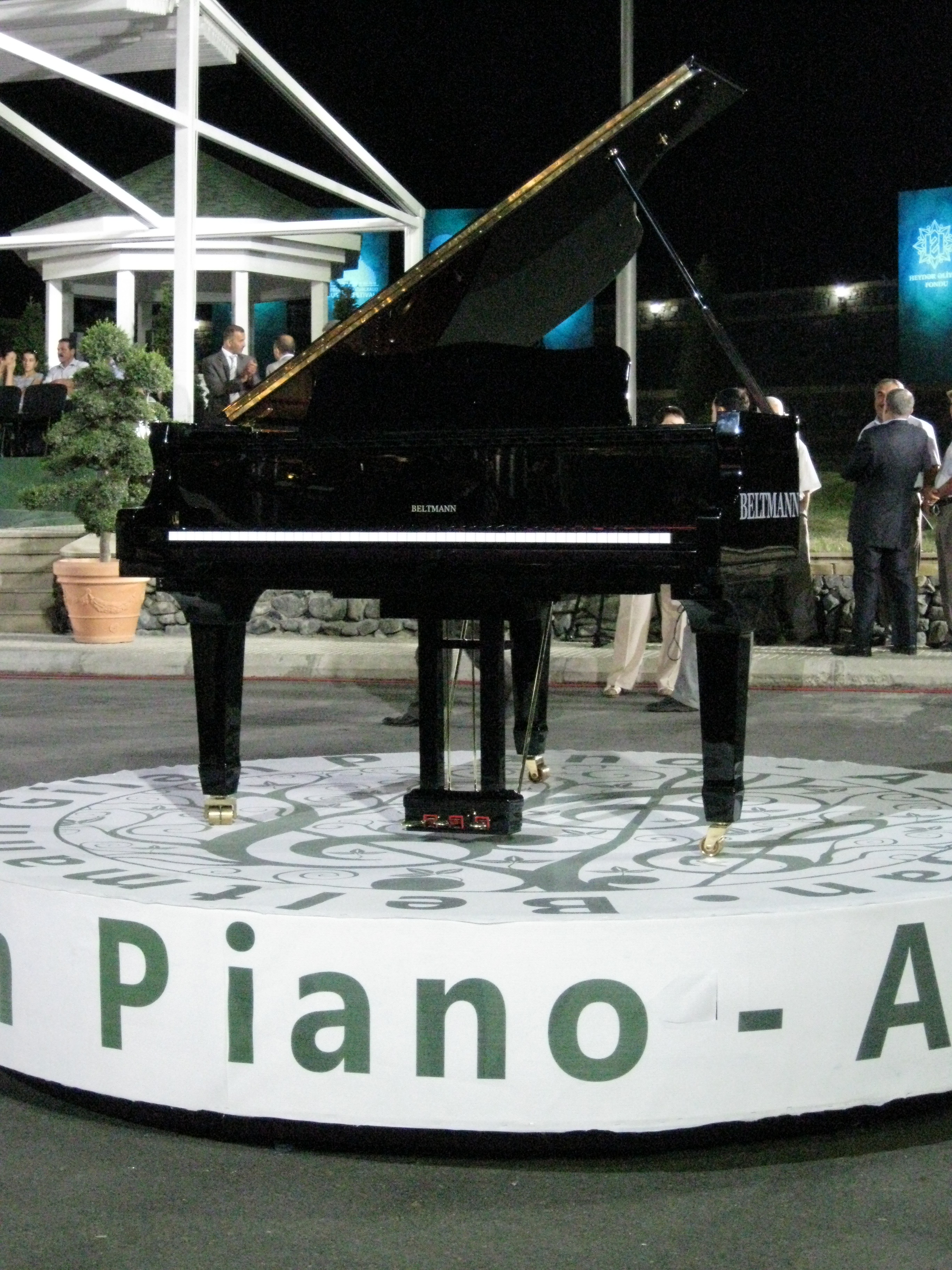
