= Khojaly 613 =

Musical play by Pierre Tilloy

- by Pierre Tilloy
- Native name: Azerbaijani: Xocalı 613
- Year: 2013
- Genre: piece
- Written: 2013, Paris
- Dedication: Khojaly massacre
- Performed: 21 February 2013, Paris
- Instrumental: Balaban, Violin, Percussion instruments

Premiere
- Date: 21 February 2013
- Location: Saint-Roch, Paris
- Conductor: Laurent Petitgirard
- Performers: Shirzad Fataliyev; Sabina Rakcheyeva

"Khojaly 613" (Azerbaijani: Xocalı 613) is a musical play of the French composer Pierre Tilloy dedicated to the memory of the Khojaly massacre's victims, during which the inhabitants of the Azerbaijani city of Khojaly were massacred by the Armenian armed groups. The piece was commissioned by the Europe-Azerbaijan Society (EAS).

The work was written for violin, balaban, percussion instruments and string orchestra. The composer used the folk Azerbaijani melodies "Lachin" and "Sary Gelin", sounding against the backdrop of a rich orchestral performance of military marches and the sounds of the conflict.

== History of creation ==
The play "Khojaly 613" was written by Pierre Tilloy in 2013 in the memory of the 613 civilians of the Azerbaijani city of Khojaly who were killed on 26 February 1992 by the Armenian armed forces during the Nagorno-Karabakh conflict. It was commissioned by the Europe-Azerbaijan Society (EAS) in 2012.

The composer himself wrote about this piece as follows:

The Khojaly massacre is one of the most vivid and nightmarish tragedies in the collective memory of the Azerbaijani people associated with the sad protracted Nagorno-Karabakh conflict from which the whole nation continues to suffer. There is a mechanism, usually called "memory", which serves as a defense against the oblivion and stands as guard over the human dignity without vulgar pathos. The "Memory" has always been the creative banner of the composers and artists who are able, going beyond the political or revolutionary context, to remind people of the milestones, difficult moments and dramas that touch them to the very depths of their souls.

== Premiere ==
The world premiere of the "Khojaly 613" play took place on 21 February 2013, in the Church of St. Roch, as part of the events organized by the French representative office of the Europe-Azerbaijan Society (EAS) in the memory of the 21st anniversary of the Khojaly massacre. The concert was attended by about 350 listeners, including senators, members of the National Assembly and ambassadors.

The concert program was performed by the London "Orion" Orchestra under the direction of the conductor and composer Laurent Petigirard; the balaban part was performed by the musician Shirzad Fataliyev, the violin part was performed by the first Azerbaijani graduate of the Juilliard School in New York, Sabina Rakcheyeva, the EAS cultural adviser.

A few days later, on 26 February, the premiere of the “Khojaly 613” play by the same cast under the direction of Laurent Pettigirard took place in London as part of a concert dedicated to the memory of the victims of the Khojaly massacre. The concert was held at the St. John Smith square, next to the Parliament building, being attended by more than 500 listeners including the members of the Parliament and diplomats. It was organized by the Europe-Azerbaijan Society (EAS).

== Reviews ==
The British composer Robbert Hugill published an article about Khojaly on the world classical music's webpage, telling about the work of the French composer Pierre Tilloy "Khojaly 613".
