= Shamsi Badalbeyli =

Shamsi Badalbeyli Azerbaijani: Şəmsi Bədəlbəyli
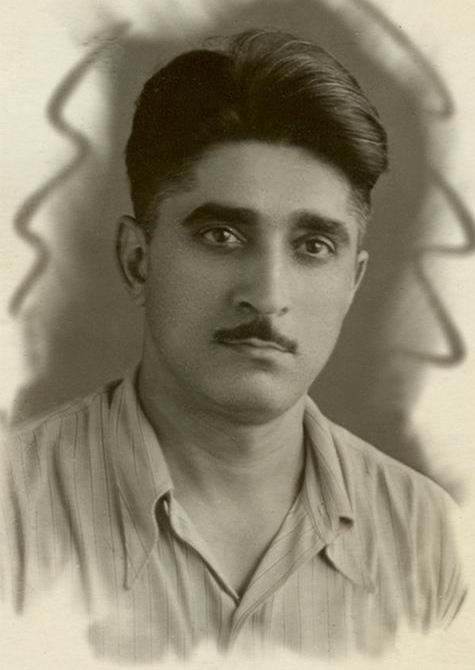
- Badelbeyli, c. 1940s
- Born: 23 February 1911; Shusha
- Died: 23 May 1987; Baku
- Education: Azerbaijan State Conservatoire
- Occupation: Theater director

Shamsi Badal oghlu Badalbeyli (Azerbaijani: Şəmsi Bədəl oğlu Bədəlbəyli) (23 February 1911 in Shusha – 23 May 1987 in Baku) was an Azerbaijani theatre director and actor.

== Life and career ==
Shamsi Badalbeyli was born in Shusha to Badal Badalbeyli, a music teacher, and his wife Rahima. He belongs to a family of Azerbaijani artists, including his uncle Ahmed Agdamski, older brother Afrasiyab Badalbeyli and son Farhad Badalbeyli.

Shamsi Badalbeyli graduated from high school in Baku and enrolled in the Azerbaijan State Conservatoire in 1927, majoring in Theory of Composition.He studied under Uzeyir bey Hajibeyov. After graduating in 1932 and doing fieldwork in Moscow's Maly Theatre, he directed Monsieur Jordan and Mastali the Dervish by Mirza Fatali Akhundov at the Azerbaijan State Academic Drama Theatre. He continued to work there until 1942.

Shamsi Badalbeyli directed his first play (Olular by Jalil Mammadguluzadeh) in the early 1940s. Throughout his life he directed 35 pieces. He starred in a number of films, namely Akhirinji ashirim ("The Final Pass"), O Gizi Tapin ("Find That Girl"), and Omrun sahifalari ("Pages of Life").

In 1943–1949, 1956–1961 and 1963–1974, Shamsi Badalbeyli served as a producer of the Azerbaijan Musical Comedy Theatre. In 1974–1976, he fulfilled similar duties at the Azerbaijan State Philharmonic Society. In 1976, he was elected head of the Azerbaijani Theatre Association. Shamsi Badalbeyli died on May 23, 1986, and was buried in the second Alley of Honor.

By his wife Leyla Safaraliyeva (1916–2000), he is the father of composer Farhad Badalbeyli.

== See also ==
- List of People's Artists of the Azerbaijan SSR
