= Jóvenes Clásicos del Son =

- Origin: Cuba
- Genres: Son, Bolero
- Years active: 1994–present
- Labels: Tumi Music Ltd / Abdala Records
- Members: Ernesto Reyes Proenza (bass/director); Pedro Lugo Martínez "El Nene" (vocals /percussion); Raudel Marzal Torres (trumpet); Sergio Lago Ortega (guitar, vocals); Juan Hernandez Jimenez (conga); Andres M. Gonzalo Gavilan (bongo); Cesar Lozada Labrada (tres)

Jóvenes Clásicos del Son (Spanish for "young classics of Son") is a Cuban septet with double bass, tres-guitar, guitar, trumpet, congas, bongos and singer. The musical director is Ernesto Reyes Proenza.

== Discography ==
- Fruta Bomba (Fruta Bomba on Tumi Music, 1999)
- No Pueden Parar, 2000
- Tambor en el Alma (Tambor en el Alma on Tumi Music, 2003)
- Menos jóvenes, más clásicos (Abdala Records, 2006)
- Cantan en Llano, 2012
- Pedacito De Mi Vida, 2014
- El Bar de Paco, 2016
