= Composition school =

Group of composers

A composition school is a group of composers or a style of composition purportedly shared by a group of composers, often from the same area or who studied in the same place. The membership of almost all groups is assigned by others and disputed.

For example, the title "mighty handful" was coined by music critic Vladimir Stasov in 1867 to describe the composers also referred to as The Five—first by Balakirev in 1870 (Garden 2001), while the "Boston Six" were grouped by others and may include ten members. The international members of the Darmstadt School all attended the Darmstädter Ferienkurse. The Franco-Flemish School (1400–1630) is split into five generations, each of which have at least three members, while Les Six (1920) contains six members.

== See also ==
- Prima pratica
- Seconda pratica
