= Suite for Jazz Orchestra No. 2 =

1938 suite by Dmitri Shostakovich

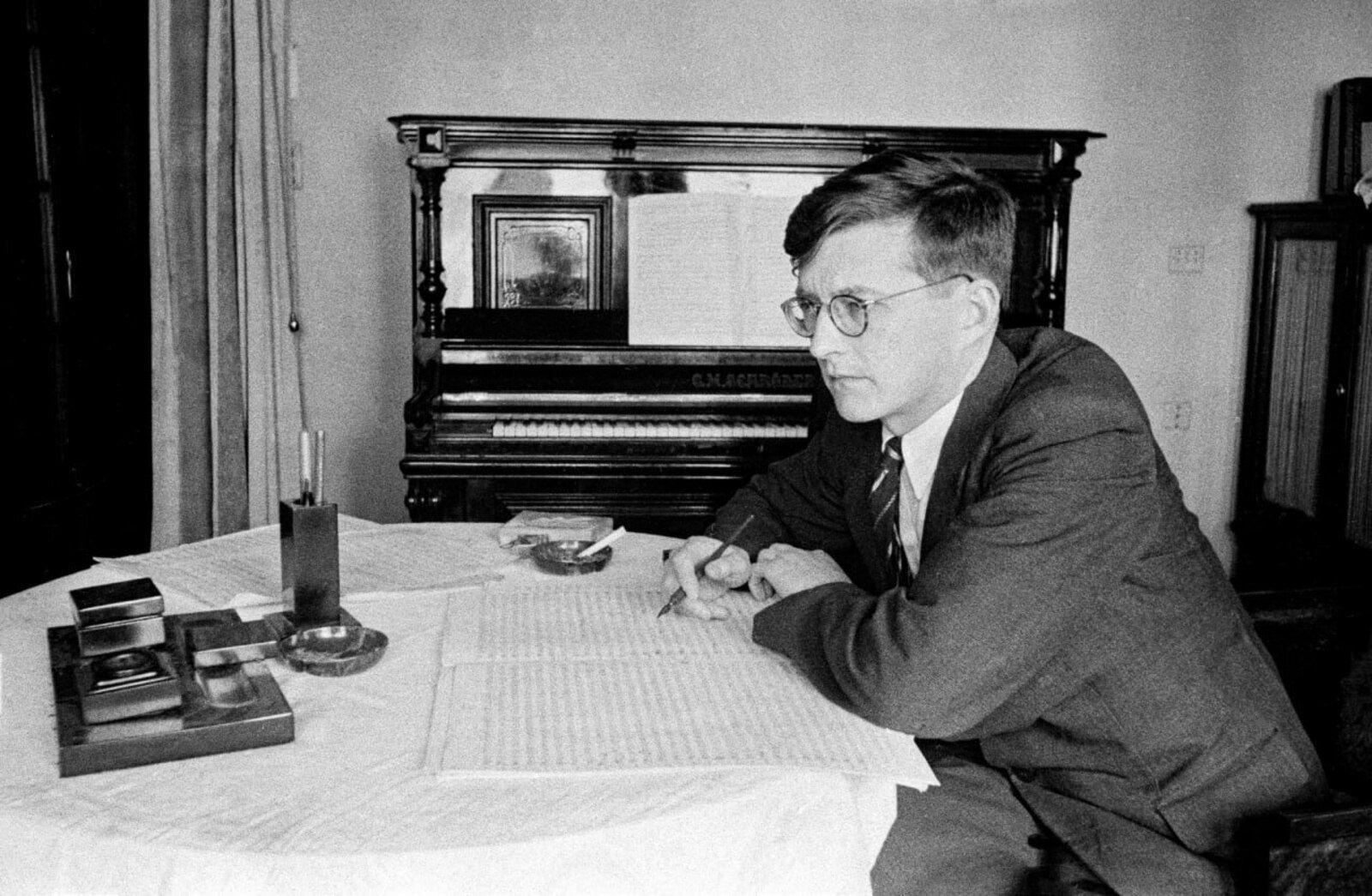
Dmitri Shostakovich in 1940

The Suite for Jazz Orchestra No. 2 (Russian: Сюита для джазового оркестра №2) is a suite by Dmitri Shostakovich. It was written in 1938 for the newly founded State Jazz Orchestra of Victor Knushevitsky, and was premiered on 28 November 1938 in Moscow (Moscow Radio) by the State Jazz Orchestra. The score was used in a Soviet movie in 1950. It was performed in England for the first time in 1984. A piano score of the work was rediscovered in 1999. Three movements of the suite were reconstructed and orchestrated by Gerard McBurney, after which it was performed at a The Proms in London in 2000.

The Suite, in its reconstructed form, consists of the following movements:

1. Scherzo
2. Lullaby
3. Serenade

Prior to its rediscovery, another eight-movement suite by Shostakovich had been misidentified and recorded as the second Jazz Suite. That work is now correctly known as the Suite for Variety Orchestra.

== See also ==
- Suite for Jazz Orchestra No. 1
- Suite for Variety Orchestra No. 1
