= Suite for Jazz Orchestra No. 1 (Shostakovich) =

1934 suite by Dmitri Shostakovich

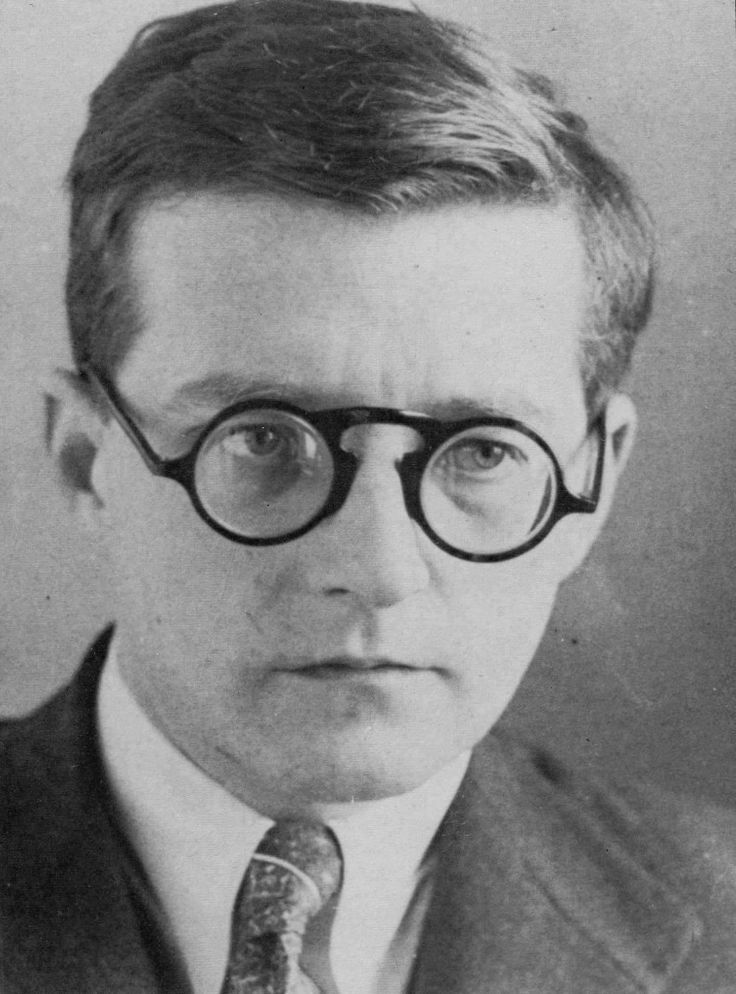
Dmitri Shostakovich before 1941

The Suite for Jazz Orchestra No. 1 (commonly known as Jazz Suite No. 1) by Dmitri Shostakovich was composed in 1934.

== Structure ==
The suite has three movements:

1. Waltz in G minor
2. Polka in C major
3. Foxtrot in F♯ minor

It is scored for 3 saxophones (2 alto (2nd doubling soprano), and tenor), 2 trumpets, trombone, wood block, snare drum, suspended cymbal, glockenspiel, xylophone - one player, banjo, Hawaiian guitar, piano, violin and double bass. The premiere was on March 24, 1934. A performance takes about 8 minutes.

Shostakovich used the waltz in his 1935 ballet The Limpid Stream.

== See also ==
- Suite for Jazz Orchestra No. 2
- Suite for Variety Orchestra No. 1
