= Sabina Rakcheyeva =

Azerbaijani musician (born 1976)

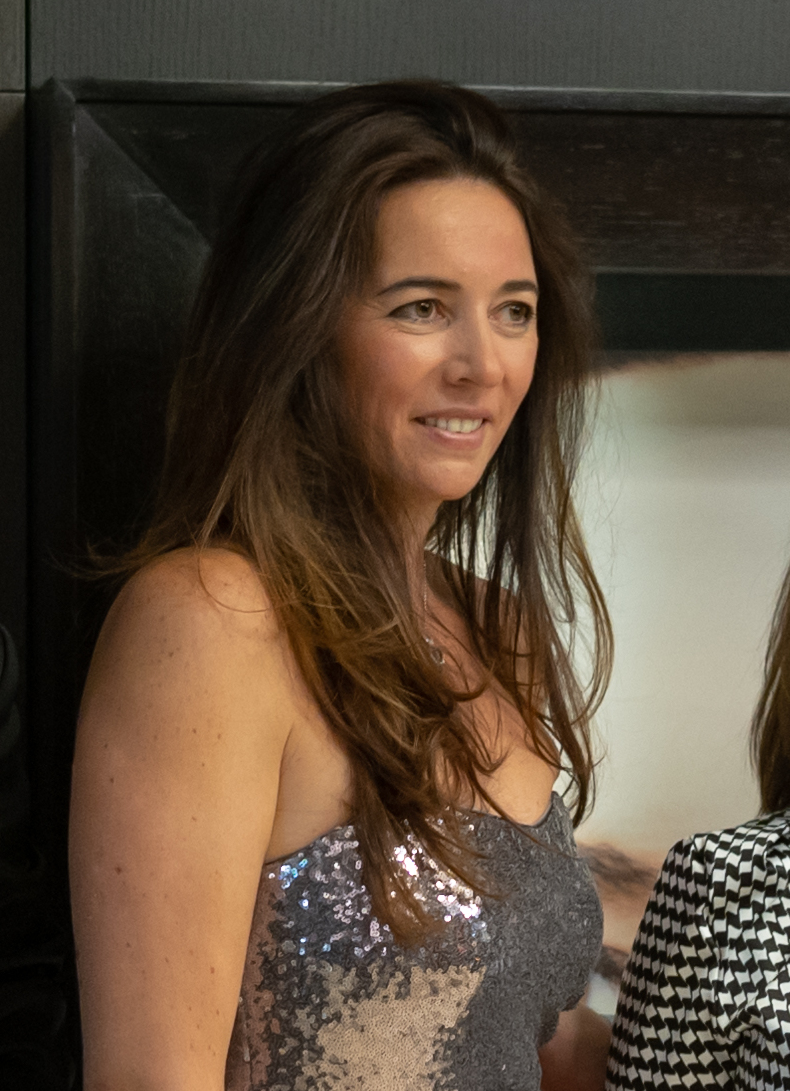
- Rakcheyeva in 2022
- Born: 1976 (age 49–50); Baku
- Occupation: Violinist

Sabina Rakcheyeva (Azerbaijani: Səbinə Rakçeyeva, born 1976, Baku) is an Azerbaijani violinist, soloist, concertmaster and a member of the European Cultural Parliament.

== Life ==
Rakcheyeva began studying violin at the age of six. In 1997, Sabina was named Best Violinist of the Year at the Youth Music Competition in Baku. She graduated magna cum laude from Azerbaijan State Music College (1994) and Baku Music Academy (2000). Rakcheyeva auditioned for a jury at Juilliard School, performing the pieces by Johann Sebastian Bach, Georges Bizet, Niccolò Paganini and Dmitri Shostakovich and became the first Azerbaijani to be admitted there. She made her mark as a world-class classical fiddler.

At Caspian Jazz and Blues Festival 2003 in Baku Rakcheyeva debuted as a jazz violinist. In 2008 Rakcheyeva's trio performed mugams and world classical music at the concert in London dedicated to 90th anniversary of composer Gara Garayev. On the 91st anniversary of Azerbaijan Democratic Republic in 2009, Rakcheyeva and her group gave a concert in Monterey, California, performing the Western classic music and pieces of Azerbaijani folklore samples "Sari Galin" and "Lachin".
