= Farhad Badalbeyli =

Azerbaijani musician (born 1947)

Farhad Badalbeyli Fərhad Bədəlbəyli
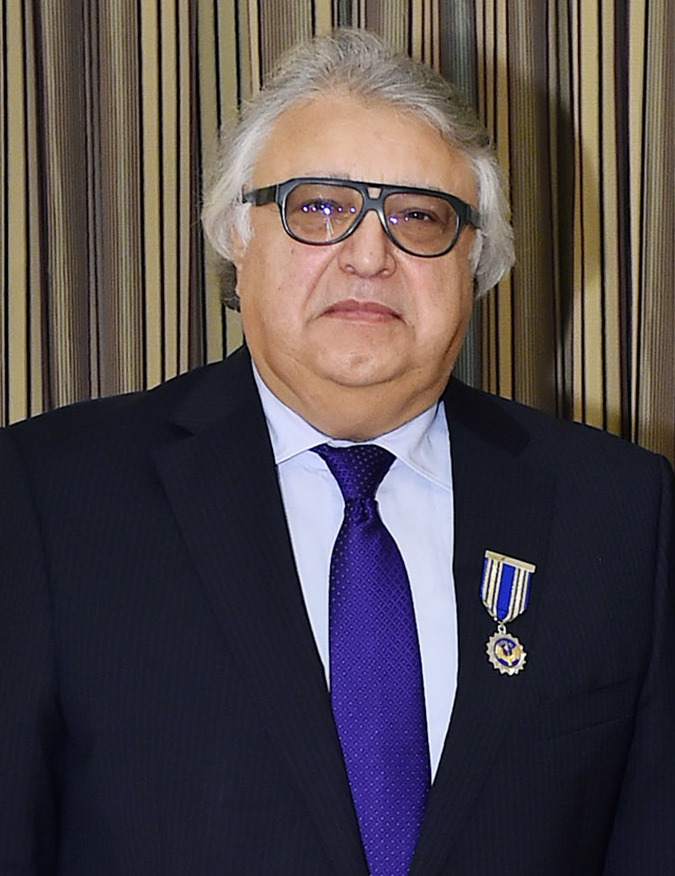
- Badalbeyli in 2017

Background information
- Born: 1947 (age 78–79); Baku, Azerbaijan SSR, Soviet Union
- Genres: Classical
- Occupations: Pianist, composer
- Instrument: Piano

Farhad Shamsi oghlu Badalbeyli (Note: Azerbaijani: Fərhad Şəmsi oğlu Bədəlbəyli; Russian: Фархад Шамси оглы Бадалбейли, romanized: Farkhad Shamsi ogly Badalbeyli) (born 1947) is an Azerbaijani pianist and composer. He was awarded the honorary titles, Honored Artist of Azerbaijan SSR (1972), People's Artiste of the Azerbaijan SSR (1978), the People's Artist of the USSR (1990), and laureate of the State Prize of the Azerbaijan SSR (1986).

== Biography ==
Farhad Badalbeyli was born in 1947 in Baku, Azerbaijan SSR; the son of Leyla and Shamsi Badalbeyli. His uncle is Afrasiyab Badalbeyli.

In 1968, he tied with Viktoria Postnikova in winning the 4th Vianna da Motta International Music Competition in Lisbon. From 1965 to 1969, he was educated at the Azerbaijan Conservatory named after U. Hajibeyov. In the period from 1969 to 1971, he studied at the Tchaikovsky Moscow Conservatory. Since 1991, he has been the rector of the Baku Academy of Music, where he has taught since 1971.

He is a member of the board of the Azerbaijani Community of Nagorno-Karabakh and in 1995 was elected a member of the American-Azerbaijani foundation "Friends of Culture of Azerbaijan".
