= Suite for Variety Orchestra No. 1 =

Suite based on music by Dmitri Shostakovich

- by Dmitri Shostakovich and Levon Atovmyan
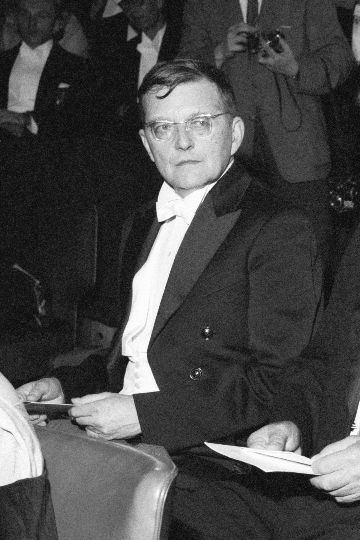
- Dmitri Shostakovich in 1958
- Composed: after 1956
- Duration: c. 20 minutes
- Movements: 8
- Scoring: Pops orchestra

Premiere
- Date: December 1, 1988
- Location: Barbican Hall; London, United Kingdom
- Conductor: Mstislav Rostropovich
- Performers: London Symphony Orchestra
- Previously misidentified as "Suite for Jazz Orchestra No. 2"

The Suite for Variety Orchestra No. 1 (Russian: Сюита для эстрадного оркестра № 1, romanized: Syuita dlya estradnogo orkestra nomer 1) is a suite in eight movements arranged by Levon Atovmyan after 1956, based on music by Dmitri Shostakovich. An editorial error in the tenth volume of the Shostakovich collected works edition published by Muzyka in 1984 resulted in the Suite for Variety Orchestra No. 1 being misidentified as the "Suite for Jazz Orchestra No. 2" or "Jazz Suite No. 2". The score was first published with the correct name in 2001.

Atovmyan, who arranged and assembled the suite, was a close friend of Shostakovich, and was regularly tasked with arranging concert suites of his film music. He also made numerous other transcriptions and arrangements, often without the composer's involvement and only his tacit approval. The Suite for Variety Orchestra No. 1 includes arrangements of excerpts from Shostakovich's ballet, theatre, and film music. It has not been precisely dated, but is believed to have been composed after 1956.

The first documented performance took place on December 1, 1988, at the Barbican Hall, played by the London Symphony Orchestra conducted by Mstislav Rostropovich. The Royal Concertgebouw Orchestra conducted by Riccardo Chailly made a successful recording of the suite in 1991. In 1994, André Rieu released a recording of the suite's "Waltz II" that broke into the top 5 of the Dutch Mega Top 50 and sold over 50,000 copies. Chailly's version of "Waltz II" was later included in the soundtrack to Stanley Kubrick's Eyes Wide Shut.

== Misidentification ==
The Suite for Variety Orchestra No. 1 is often mistaken for the unrelated Suite for Jazz Orchestra No. 2 from 1938. This resulted from an error in an editorial footnote printed in volume 10 of the Shostakovich collected works edition published by Muzyka in 1984, which misidentified the Suite for Variety Orchestra No. 1 as the "Suite for Jazz Orchestra No. 2". The editor-in-chief of the collected works edition, Konstantin Titarenko, inserted the footnote without informing his editorial staff. When Manashir Yakubov, the uncredited editor of volume 10's critical commentary, called to inform him of his mistake and demanded an explanation, Titarenko hung up.

== Background ==
Despite being commonly attributed to Shostakovich and based on his music, the Suite for Variety Orchestra No. 1 was arranged by Levon Atovmyan; a composer, arranger, and artistic administrator born in Russian Turkestan. They met at a meeting of Vsyeroskomdram, the All-Russia Society of Composers and Dramatists, in the early 1930s. Atovmyan subsequently became part of Shostakovich's circle of close friends; later, he was regularly entrusted with arranging concert suites of his film music. In addition, Atovmyan also made transcriptions and arrangements of Shostakovich's other music. Although his arrangements of Shostakovich's music were made with the composer's tacit approval, they incorporated extensive alterations and newly-composed material.

No manuscript score of the Suite for Variety Orchestra No. 1 exists in Shostakovich's hand. Its instrumentation, movement arrangement, and generic titling of movements also do not correspond with Shostakovich's style. No precise date for the suite's composition can be ascertained, but it is believed to have been composed in the late 1950s, some time after 1956. The unusual scoring, which includes three sections of violins and two pianos, suggests that the suite may have been produced for a specific ensemble.

== Music ==
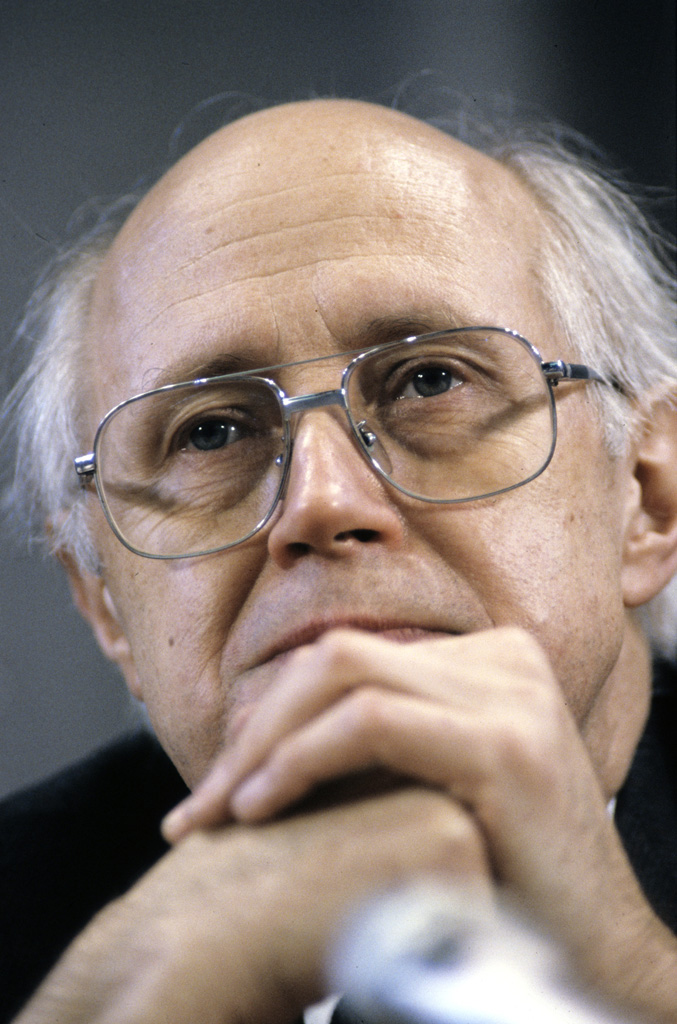
Mstislav Rostropovich conducted the first documented performance of the Suite for Variety Orchestra No. 1 in 1988

The Suite for Variety Orchestra No. 1 consists of eight movements:

1. March (Giocoso. Alla marcia)
2. Dance I (Presto)
3. Dance II (Allegretto scherzando—Poco meno mosso—Tempo I)
4. Little Polka (Allegretto)
5. Lyrical Waltz (Allegretto)
6. Waltz I (Sostenuto—Tempo di valse—Poco più mosso)
7. Waltz II (Allegretto poco moderato)
8. Finale (Allegro moderato)

Each of the suite's movements is arranged from Shostakovich's scores for the ballet, theatre, and cinema. The first and last movements are based on the "March" from the 1940 comedy film Adventures of Korzinkina; the "Waltz I" is an arrangement of a cue that had been cut from the film. "Dance I" is based on the "Marketplace" cue from the 1955 film The Gadfly, which is alternatively known as "National Holiday" in Atovmyan's concert suite of the film music. "Dance 2" is an arrangement of the "Invitation to a Rendezvous" number from The Limpid Stream, itself an arrangement of the number "Pantomime and Dance of a Priest" from The Bolt. The "Little Polka", "Lyrical Waltz", and "Waltz II" are arrangements of cues composed for the soundtrack to The First Echelon; the first two cues had been discarded from the final version of the film score.

A typical performance of the Suite for Variety Orchestra No. 1 lasts approximately 20 minutes.

=== Instrumentation ===
The instrumentation for the Suite for Variety Orchestra No. 1 is as follows:

Woodwinds
2 flutes (2nd doubling piccolo)
1 oboe
2 clarinets
2 alto saxophones
2 tenor saxophones (2nd doubling soprano saxophone)
1 bassoon
Brass
3 French horns
3 trumpets
3 trombones
1 tuba

Percussion
timpani
bass drum
Charleston
snare drum
1 pair of crash cymbals
suspended cymbal
triangle
tambourine
glockenspiel
xylophone
vibraphone

Keyboards
2 pianos (or piano duet)
celesta
accordion
Strings
harp
guitar
1st violins
2nd violins
violas
cellos
double basses

The original score divided the violins into three sections. These were reduced to two in the 2001 New Collected Works edition of the score; this was accomplished by combining the first and second violin parts, which frequently played unison. Portions of the score's parts for two pianos were given ossia for piano duet. None of these changes resulted in any substantial alterations to the musical text.

== Premieres ==
The first documented performance of the Suite for Variety Orchestra No. 1 was on December 1, 1988. It referred to as "Jazz Suite No. 2" and was played at the Barbican Hall by the London Symphony Orchestra conducted by Mstislav Rostropovich. The performance was broadcast by the BBC on December 4. The first recording was made in 1991 for Decca by the Royal Concertgebouw Orchestra conducted by Riccardo Chailly.

In 2001, the score was published for the first time.

== Reception ==
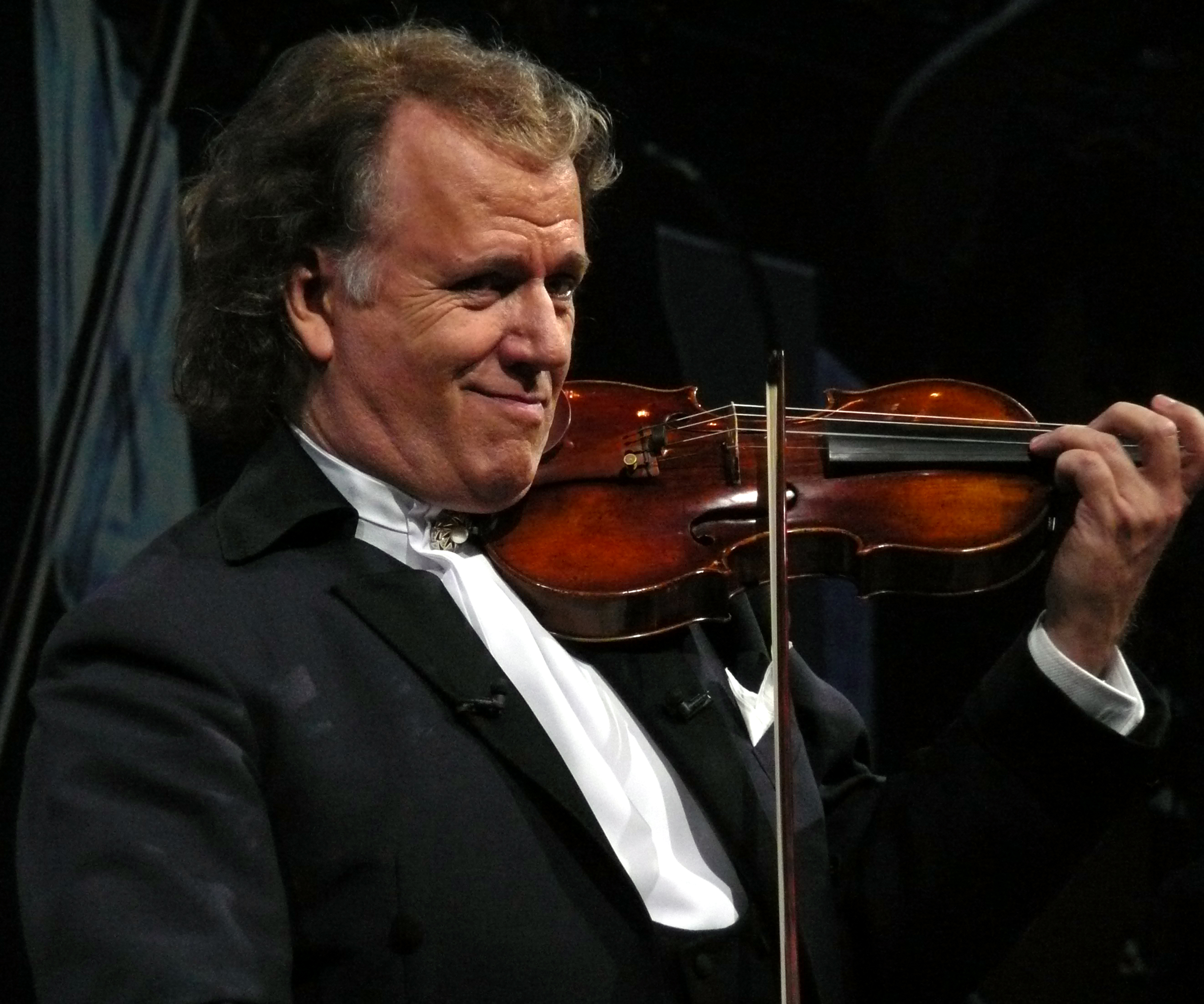
André Rieu's 1994 recording of the "Waltz II" became a hit in Europe

Nicholas Kenyon in his review of the Suite for Variety Orchestra No. 1's premiere for The Observer wrote that the music was "Shostakovich at his most unbuttoned and jovial":

The LSO played the Second Suite for Jazz Orchestra or Dance Band [sic] with its four blaring saxophones, accordion and guitar, as if to the manner born... The music is tripe, and not very well planned tripe at that—three waltzes in succession!—but Rostropovich lifted it along with such panache that it worked.

He also called the work "fairly cynical pieces of writing-to-order".

Chailly's Decca recording was a popular and critical success; his recording of the "Waltz II" was included in the soundtrack to Stanley Kubrick's Eyes Wide Shut. Roger Covell in the Sydney Morning Herald praised Chailly's "elegantly played" recording and compared Shostakovich's music favorably with William Walton's Façade.

In 1994, Philips Records issued a single of the "Waltz II" from the suite performed by André Rieu and his orchestra. It reached 5 in the Dutch Mega Top 50 and sold over 50,000 copies. The recording was included in the album From Holland With Love in 1996.
