= List of compositions by Pyotr Ilyich Tchaikovsky =

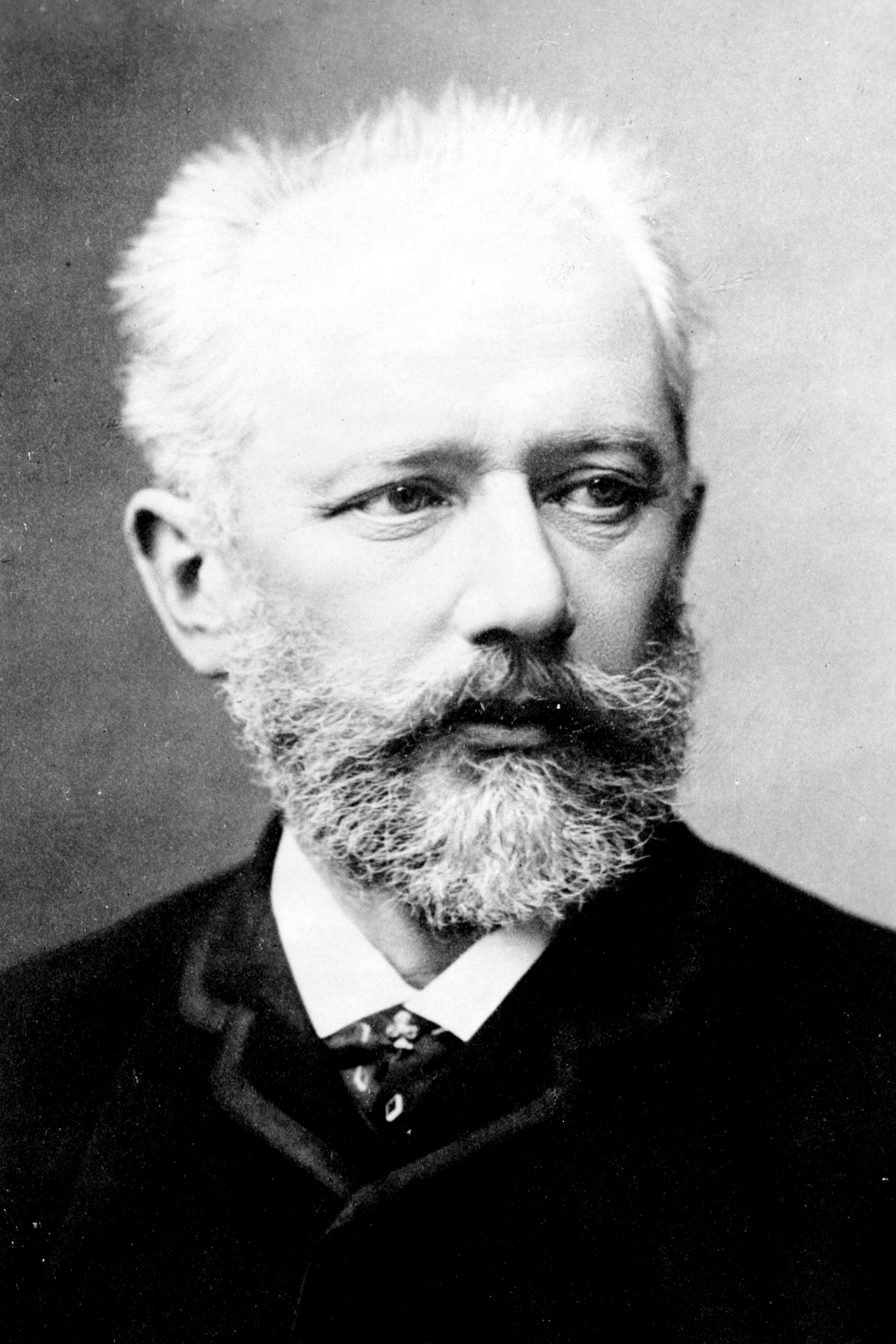
Pyotr Ilyich Tchaikovsky

Pyotr Ilyich Tchaikovsky wrote many works well-known to the general classical public, including Romeo and Juliet, the 1812 Overture, and the ballets Swan Lake, The Sleeping Beauty and The Nutcracker. These, along with two of his four concertos, three of his symphonies and two of his ten operas, are among his most familiar works. Almost as popular are the Manfred Symphony, Francesca da Rimini, the Capriccio Italien, and the Serenade for Strings.

== Works by opus number ==
Works with opus numbers are listed in this section, together with their dates of composition. For a complete list of Tchaikovsky's works, including those without opus numbers, see here. For more detail on dates of composition, see here.

- Op. 1 Two Pieces for piano (1867)
  - Scherzo à la russe in B♭ major
  - Impromptu in E♭ minor
- Op. 2 Souvenir de Hapsal, 3 pieces for piano (1867)
- Op. 3 The Voyevoda, opera (1868)
- Op. 4 Valse-caprice in D major, for piano (1868)
- Op. 5 Romance in F minor, for piano (1868)
- Op. 6 6 Romances (1869), including "None but the lonely heart"
- Op. 7 Valse-scherzo in A, for piano (1870)
- Op. 8 Capriccio in G♭, for piano (1870)
- Op. 9 3 Morceaux, for piano (1870)
  1. Rêverie
  2. Polka de salon
  3. Mazurka de salon
- Op. 10 2 Morceaux, for piano (1871)
  1. Nocturne
  2. Humoresque
- Op. 11 String Quartet No. 1 in D (1871)
- Op. 12 Snegurochka (The Snow Maiden), incidental music (1873)
- Op. 13 Symphony No. 1 in G minor Winter Daydreams (1866)
- Op. 14 Vakula the Smith, (revised as Cherevichki), opera (1874)
- Op. 15 Festival Overture in D on the Danish National Anthem, for orchestra (1866)
- Op. 16 6 Songs (1872)
  1. Lullaby (Cradle Song)
  2. Wait!
  3. Accept Just Once
  4. O, Sing That Song
  5. So What?
  6. Modern Greek Song
- Op. 17 Symphony No. 2 in C minor Little Russian (1872)
- Op. 18 The Tempest, symphonic fantasia in F minor, after Shakespeare (1873)
- Op. 19 6 Pieces, for piano (1873)
  1. Rêverie du soir [Вечерние грезы] (G minor)
  2. Scherzo humoristique [Юмористическое скерцо] (D major)
  3. Feuillet d'album [Листок из альбома] (D major)
  4. Nocturne [Ноктюрн] (C♯ minor)
  5. Capriccioso [Каприччиозо] (B♭ major)
  6. Thème original et variations [Тема и вариации] (F major)
- Op. 20 Swan Lake, ballet (1876)
- Op. 21 6 Morceaux on a single theme, for piano (1873)
- Op. 22 String Quartet No. 2 in F (1874)
- Op. 23 Piano Concerto No. 1 in B♭ minor (1875)
- Op. 24 Eugene Onegin, opera (1878)
- Op. 25 6 Songs (1874)
  1. Reconciliation
  2. As When Upon Hot Ashes (Over Burning Ashes)
  3. Mignon's Song
  4. The Canary
  5. I Never Spoke To Her
  6. As They Repeated: "Fool"
- Op. 26 Sérénade mélancolique in B♭ minor, for violin and orchestra (1875)
- Op. 27 6 Songs (1875)
- Op. 28 6 Songs (1875)
- Op. 29 Symphony No. 3 in D Polish (1875)
- Op. 30 String Quartet No. 3 in E♭ minor (1876)
- Op. 31 Marche slave in B♭ minor, for orchestra (1876)
- Op. 32 Francesca da Rimini, symphonic fantasia in E minor, after Dante Alighieri (1876)
- Op. 33 Variations on a Rococo Theme in A, for cello and orchestra (1876)
- Op. 34 Valse-scherzo in C for violin and orchestra (1877)
- Op. 35 Violin Concerto in D major (1878)
- Op. 36 Symphony No. 4 in F minor (1877)
- Op. 37 (or 37a) Grand Piano Sonata in G (1878)
- Op. 37a (or 37b) The Seasons, 12 pieces for piano (1876)
  1. January: At the fireside
  2. February: Carnival
  3. March: Song of the Lark
  4. April: Snowdrop
  5. May: Starlit Nights
  6. June: Barcarolle
  7. July: Song of the Reaper
  8. August: Harvest
  9. September: The Hunt
  10. October: Autumn Song
  11. November: Troika
  12. December: Christmas
- Op. 38 6 Songs (1878)
- Op. 39 Album pour enfants, 24 pieces for piano (1878)
  1. Morning Prayer
  2. Winter Morning
  3. Playing Hobby-Horses
  4. Mama
  5. March of the Wooden Soldiers
  6. The New Doll
  7. The Sick Doll
  8. The Doll's Funeral
  9. Waltz
  10. Polka
  11. Mazurka
  12. Russian Song
  13. The Harmonica Player
  14. Kamarinskaya
  15. Peasant Prelude
  16. Italian song
  17. Old French Song
  18. German Song
  19. Nanny's Story
  20. Baba Yaga (The Sorcerer)
  21. Sweet Dreams
  22. Lark Song
  23. In Church
  24. The Song of the Organ-Grinder
- Op. 40 12 Morceaux de difficulté moyenne, for piano (1878)
  1. Etude: Allegro giusto (G major)
  2. Chanson triste: Allegro non troppo (G minor)
  3. Marche funèbre: Tempo di Marcia funebre (C minor)
  4. Mazurka: Tempo di Mazurka (C major)
  5. Mazurka: Tempo di Mazurka (D major)
  6. Chant sans paroles: Allegro moderato: (A minor)
  7. Au village: Andante sostenuto: (A minor–C major)
  8. Valse: Tempo di Valse (A♭ major)
  9. Valse: Tempo di Valse (F♯ minor)
  10. Danse russe: Andantino (A minor)
  11. Scherzo: Allegro vivacissimo (D minor)
  12. Rêverie interrompue: Andante un poco rubato e con molto espressione (A♭ major)
- Op. 41 Liturgy of St. John Chrysostom, for unaccompanied chorus (1878)
- Op. 42 Souvenir d'un lieu cher, 3 pieces for violin and piano (1878)
- Op. 43 Orchestral Suite No. 1 in D minor (1879)
- Op. 44 Piano Concerto No. 2 in G (1880)
- Op. 45 Capriccio Italien in A, for orchestra (1880)
- Op. 46 6 Vocal duets, with piano (1880)
- Op. 47 7 Songs (1880)
  1. If Only I Had Known
  2. Softly the Spirit Flew up to Heaven
  3. Dusk Fell on the Earth
  4. Sleep, Poor Friend
  5. I Bless You, Forests
  6. Does the Day Reign?
  7. Was I Not a Little Blade of Grass in the Meadow?
- Op. 48 Serenade in C for Strings (1880)
- Op. 49 1812 Overture (1880)
- Op. 50 Piano Trio in A minor (1882)
- Op. 51 6 Pieces, for piano (1882)
  1. Valse de salon (A♭ major)
  2. Polka peu dansante (B minor)
  3. Menuetto scherzoso (E♭ major)
  4. Natha-Valse (A major)
  5. Romance (F major)
  6. Valse sentimentale (F minor)
- Op. 52 All-Night Vigil for unaccompanied chorus (1882)
- Op. 53 Orchestral Suite No. 2 in C (1883)
- Op. 54 16 Children's songs (1883; the 5th song Legend was the basis of Anton Arensky's Variations on a Theme by Tchaikovsky, Op. 35a)
- Op. 55 Orchestral Suite No. 3 in G (1884)
- Op. 56 Concert Fantasia in G, for piano and orchestra (1884)
- Op. 57 6 Songs (1884)
- Op. 58 Manfred Symphony in B minor (1885)
- Op. 59 Dumka in C minor, for piano (1886)
- Op. 60 12 Songs (1886)
  6. Wild Nights (Frenzied Nights)
  7. Gypsy's Song
  12. Gentle Stars Shone For Us (The Mild Stars Shone For Us)
- Op. 61 Orchestral Suite No. 4 "Mozartiana" (1887)
- Op. 62 Pezzo capriccioso in B minor, for cello and orchestra (or piano) (1887)
- Op. 63 6 Romances on words by K. Romanov (1887)
  1. I Didn't Love You At First [Я сначала тебя не любила]
  2. I Opened The Window [Растворил я окно]
  3. I Do Not Please You [Я вам не нравлюсь]
  4. No. 4 The First Meeting [Первое свидание]
  5. No. 5 The Fires In The Rooms Were Already Out [Уж гасли в комнатах огни]
  6. No. 6 Serenade: O Child! Beneath Your Window [Серенада (О, дитя! под окошком твоим)]
- Op. 64 Symphony No. 5 in E minor (1888)
- Op. 65 6 Songs on French texts (1888) (No. 2 Déception, No. 3 Sérénade ("J'aime dans le rayon"), No. 4 Qu'importe que l'hiver, No. 6 Rondel, all on poems by Paul Collin)
- Op. 66 The Sleeping Beauty, ballet (1889)
- Op. 67a Hamlet, fantasy overture in F minor (1889)
- Op. 67b Hamlet, incidental music (1891)
- Op. 68 The Queen of Spades, opera (1890)
- Op. 69 Iolanta, opera (1891)
- Op. 70 String Sextet in D minor Souvenir de Florence (1890)
- Op. 71 The Nutcracker, ballet (1892)
- Op. 71a The Nutcracker, suite from the ballet (1892)
- Op. 72 18 Pieces, for piano (1893)
- Op. 73 Romances (6 Songs) (1893)
- Op. 74 Symphony No. 6 in B minor Pathétique (1893)

Opp. 75–80 were published posthumously.

- Op. 75 Piano Concerto No. 3 in E♭ (1893)
- Op. 76 The Storm, overture in E minor (1864)
- Op. 77 Fatum, symphonic poem in C minor (1868)
- Op. 78 The Voyevoda, symphonic ballad in A minor (1891; unrelated to the earlier opera of the same name, Op. 3)
- Op. 79 Andante and Finale, for piano and orchestra (1893; this was Sergei Taneyev's idea of what Tchaikovsky might have written had he used three of the movements of the abandoned Symphony in E♭, rather than just the first movement Allegro brillante, when rescoring the symphony as the Piano Concerto No. 3 in E♭)
- Op. 80 Piano Sonata No. 2 in C♯ minor (1865)

== Works by genre ==
=== Ballets ===
- Swan Lake, Op. 20 (1875–76)
- The Sleeping Beauty, Op. 66 (1889)
- The Nutcracker, Op. 71 (1892)

=== Operas ===
- The Voyevoda, Op. 3/TH 1 (Воевода – The Voivode, 1867–1868) (Note: Not related to the much later symphonic ballad The Voyevoda, Op. 78.)
- Undina, TH 2 (Ундина or Undine, 1869, not completed)
- The Oprichnik, TH 3 (Опричник) 1870–1872
- Vakula the Smith, Op. 14/TH 4 (Кузнец Вакула or Kuznets Vakula), 1874 (Note: Revised later as Cherevichki)
- Eugene Onegin, Op. 24/TH 5 (Евгений Онегин or Yevgeny Onegin), 1877–1878
- The Maid of Orleans, TH 6 (Орлеанская дева or Orleanskaya deva), 1878–1879
- Mazepa (or Mazeppa), TH 7 (Мазепа), 1881–1883
- Cherevichki, TH 8 (Черевички; revision of Vakula the Smith) 1885
- The Enchantress, TH 9 (or The Sorceress, Чародейка or Charodeyka), 1885–1887
- The Queen of Spades, Op. 68/TH 10 (Пиковая дама or Pikovaya dama), 1890
- Iolanta (Иоланта), Op. 69/TH 11, 1891 (Note: Originally performed on a double-bill with The Nutcracker)

=== Symphonies ===
- No. 1 in G minor, Op. 13, Winter Daydreams (1866)
- No. 2 in C minor, Op. 17, Little Russian (1872)
- No. 3 in D major, Op. 29, Polish (1875)
- No. 4 in F minor, Op. 36 (1877–1878)
- Manfred Symphony, B minor, Op. 58; inspired by Byron's poem Manfred (1885)
- No. 5 in E minor, Op. 64 (1888)
- Symphony in E♭ (sketched 1892 but abandoned; Tchaikovsky rescored its first movement as the Piano Concerto No. 3 in E♭; posthumously, Taneyev rescored two other movements for piano and orchestra as the Andante and Finale; the symphony was reconstructed during the 1950s and subsequently published as "Symphony No. 7")
- No. 6 in B minor, Op. 74, Pathétique (1893)

=== Concertos and concertante pieces ===
- Piano Concerto No. 1 in B♭ minor, Op. 23 (1874–75)
- Sérénade mélancolique, Op. 26, for violin and orchestra (1875)
- Variations on a Rococo Theme for cello and orchestra, Op. 33 (1876–77)
- Valse-Scherzo for violin and orchestra, Op. 34
- Violin Concerto in D major, Op. 35 (1878)
- Piano Concerto No. 2 in G major, Op. 44 (1879–80)
- Concert Fantasia in G for piano and orchestra, Op. 56 (1884)
- Pezzo capriccioso, Op. 62, for cello and Orchestra (1888)
- Piano Concerto No. 3 in E♭ major, Op. posth. 75 (1893)
- Andante and Finale for piano and orchestra, Op. posth. 79 (1893)
  - This was Sergei Taneyev's idea of what Tchaikovsky might have written had he used three of the movements of the abandoned Symphony in E♭, rather than just the first movement Allegro brillante, when rescoring the symphony as the Piano Concerto No. 3 in E♭
- Cello Concerto (conjectural work based in part on a 60-bar fragment found on the back of the rough draft for the last movement of the composer's Sixth Symphony).
- Concertstück for Flute and Strings, TH 247 Op. posth. (1893)

=== Other orchestral works ===
- Ode an die Freude (Schiller), für SATB Solo, SATB und großes Orchester (1865)

==== Program music and commissioned pieces ====
- The Storm, Op. posth. 76 (1864)
- Festival Overture on the Danish National Anthem, Op. 15 (1866)
- Fatum, Op. posth. 77 (1868)
- Romeo and Juliet (1870, revised 1880)
- The Tempest, Op. 18 (1873)
- Marche Slave, Op. 31 (1876)
- Francesca da Rimini, Op. 32 (1876)
- Capriccio Italien, Op. 45 (1880)
- 1812 Overture, Op. 49 (1880)
- Festival Coronation March (1883)
- Hamlet, Op. 67a (1889)
- The Voyevoda, Op. posth. 78 (1891)

==== Orchestral suites and Serenade ====
- Orchestral Suite No. 1 in D minor, Op. 43 (1878–1879)
- Orchestral Suite No. 2 in C major, Op. 53 (1883)
- Orchestral Suite No. 3 in G major, Op. 55 (1884)
- Orchestral Suite No. 4 in G major "Mozartiana", Op. 61 (1887)
- Serenade for Strings in C major, Op. 48 (1880)
- The Nutcracker Suite, Op. 71a/TH 35 (1892)

==== Incidental music ====
- Dmitri the Pretender and Vassily Shuisky (1867), incidental music to Alexander Ostrovsky's play Dmitri the Pretender
- The Snow Maiden (Snegurochka), Op. 12 (1873), incidental music for Ostrovsky's play of the same name. Ostrovsky adapted and dramatized a popular Russian fairy tale, and the score that Tchaikovsky wrote for it was always one of his own favorite works. It contains much vocal music, but it is not a cantata or an opera.
- Montenegrins Receiving News of Russia's Declaration of War on Turkey (1880), music for a tableau.
- The Voyevoda (1886), incidental music for the Domovoy scene from Ostrovsky's A Dream on the Volga
- Hamlet, Op. 67b (1891), incidental music for Shakespeare's play. The score uses music borrowed from Tchaikovsky's overture of the same name, as well as from his Symphony No. 3, and from The Snow Maiden, in addition to original music that he wrote specifically for a stage production of Hamlet. The two vocal selections are a song that Ophelia sings in the throes of her madness and a song for the First Gravedigger to sing as he goes about his work.

=== Piano ===
- Two Pieces, Op. 1 (1867)
  - Scherzo à la russe
  - Impromptu
- Souvenir de Hapsal, Op. 2, 3 pieces (1867)
- Valse-caprice in D major, Op. 4 (1868)
- Romance in F minor, Op. 5 (1868)
- Valse-scherzo in A, Op. 7 (1870)
- Capriccio in G♭, Op. 8 (1870)
- 3 Morceaux, Op. 9 (1870)
  1. Rêverie
  2. Polka de salon
  3. Mazurka de salon
- 2 Morceaux, Op. 10 (1871)
  1. Nocturne
  2. Humoresque
- 6 Pieces, Op. 19 (1873)
  1. Rêverie du soir [Вечерние грезы] (G minor)
  2. Scherzo humoristique [Юмористическое скерцо] (D major)
  3. Feuillet d'album [Листок из альбом] (D major)
  4. Nocturne [Ноктюрн] (C♯ minor)
  5. Capriccioso [Каприччиозо] (B♭ major)
  6. Thème original et variations [Тема и вариации] (F major)
- 6 Morceaux, Op. 21 (1873)
- The Seasons (Les saisons), Op. 37a (1876), 12 pieces
- Piano Sonata in G major, Op. 37 (1878)
- Album pour enfants, Op. 39, 24 pieces for piano (1878)
- 12 Morceaux de difficulté moyenne, Op. 40 (1878)
- Six Morceaux, Op. 51 (1882)
- Dumka, Russian rustic scene in C minor for piano, Op. 59 (1886)
- 18 Morceaux for piano, Op. 72 (1892). Some of these pieces were used in a cello concerto arrangement by Gaspar Cassadó.
- Piano Sonata No. 2 in C♯ minor, Op. posth. 80 (1865)
- The Volunteer Fleet March in C major, TH 140; ČW 149 - was written in 1878 to help raise money for victims of the war between Russia and Turkey.

=== Chamber music ===
- Adagio molto in E♭ major for string quartet and harp (1863/64)
- String Quartet in B♭ major, Op. posth. (1865)
- String Quartet No. 1 in D major, Op. 11 (1871)
- String Quartet No. 2 in F major, Op. 22 (1874)
- String Quartet No. 3 in E♭ minor, Op. 30 (1876)
- Souvenir d'un lieu cher (Memory of a Cherished Place) for violin and piano, Op. 42 (Meditation, Scherzo and Melody) (1878)
- Piano Trio in A minor, Op. 50 (1882)
- String Sextet in D minor (Souvenir de Florence), Op. 70 (1890)

=== Choral music ===
A considerable quantity of choral music (about 25 items), including:

- Cantata (Hymn) on the Occasion of the Celebration of the 50th Jubilee of the Singer Osip Afanasievich Petrov, tenor, chorus and orchestra, words by Nikolay Nekrasov (1875; performed at the St Petersburg Conservatory on 6 May 1876, under the conductor Karl Davydov)
- A Hymn to the Trinity (1877)
- Liturgy of St John Chrysostom, Op. 41 (1878)
- All-Night Vigil, Op. 52 (1882)
- Moscow (1883)
- 9 Sacred Pieces (alternative name: 9 Church Pieces) (1884–85)
- Legend (choral arrangement of song Op. 54 No. 5, written 1889, published 1890)

=== Arrangements of the works of others ===
Composer	Work and forces	Arranged for	Date
Beethoven	Piano Sonata No. 17 in D minor, Op. 31, No. 2, "Tempest", first movement	Orchestra (4 versions)	1863
Beethoven	Violin Sonata No. 9 in A, Op. 47 "Kreutzer", first movement	Orchestra	1863–64
Bortniansky	Complete Church Music, choir	Choir, edited	July – November 1881
Cimarosa	"Le faccio un inchino", trio from Il matrimonio segreto (available for 3 voices and piano)	3 voices and orchestra	1870
Dargomyzhsky	Little Russian Kazachok, orchestra	Piano	1868
Dargomyzhsky	"The golden cloud has slept", 3 voices and piano	3 voices and orchestra	1870
Dubuque	Maria Dagmar Polka, piano	Orchestra	1869
Glinka	"Slavsya" from A Life for the Tsar, arr, couplets	Mixed chorus and orchestra	February 1883
Joseph Gungl	Le Retour, waltz, piano	Orchestra	1863–64
Haydn	"Gott erhalte Franz den Kaiser", 4 voices	Orchestra	by 24 February 1874
Kral	"Ceremonial March", piano	Orchestra	May 1867
Herman Laroche	Karmosina, Fantasy Overture, piano	Orchestra	August – September 1888
Liszt	"Es war ein Konig in Thule", voice and piano	Voice and orchestra	3 November 1874
Alexei Lvov	"God Save the Tsar!" (the then national anthem), chorus and piano	Mixed chorus and orchestra	February 1883
Sophie Menter	Ungarische Zigeunerweisen, piano (short score)	Piano and orchestra	1892
Mozart	4 works	arr. orchestra as Mozartiana (Suite No. 4)	June – August 1887
Mozart	Fantasia in C minor, K. 475, piano	Vocal quartet (Night)	15 March 1893
Anton Rubinstein	Ivan the Terrible, Op. 79, orchestra	Piano duet	18 October – 11 November 1869
Anton Rubinstein	Don Quixote, Op. 87, orchestra	Piano duet	1870
Schumann	Symphonic Studies, Op. 13 (piano), Adagio and Allegro brillante	Orchestra	1864
Schumann	"Ballade vom Haidenknaben", Op. 122, No. 1, declamation and piano	Declamation and orchestra	11 March 1874
Stradella (Note: The aria is now believed to have been written by Gluck, from his opera Paride ed Elena: "O, del mio dolce ardor (Gluck)". Tchaikovsky Research.)	"O del mio dolce", song with piano	Voice and orchestra	10 November 1870
Tarnovsky	Song "I remember all", arr. Dubuque for piano	Piano duet	1868
Weber	Piano Sonata in A♭, J. 199, Scherzo Menuetto	Orchestra	1863
Weber	Piano sonata in C, J. 138 – Perpetuum mobile	Piano left hand	1871

== See also ==
- Pyotr Ilyich Tchaikovsky in popular media

== Bibliography ==
- ed Abraham, Gerald, Music of Tchaikovsky (New York: W.W. Norton & Company, 1946). ISBN n/a.
  - Abraham, Gerald, "Operas and Incidental Music"
  - Alshvang, A., tr. I. Freiman, "The Songs"
  - Cooper, Martin, "The Symphonies"
  - Dickinson, A.E.F., "The Piano Music"
  - Evans, Edwin, "The Ballets"
  - Mason, Colin, "The Chamber Music"
  - Wood, Ralph W., "Miscellaneous Orchestral Works"
- Brown, David, ed. Stanley Sadie, "Tchaikokvsky, Pyotr Ilyich," The New Grove Encyclopedia of Music and Musicians (London: Macmillan, 1980), 20 vols. ISBN 0-333-23111-2.
- Brown, David, Tchaikovsky: The Early Years, 1840-1874 (New York: W.W. Norton & Company, 1978). ISBN 0-393-07535-4.
- Brown, David, Tchaikovsky: The Crisis Years, 1874-1878, (New York: W.W. Norton & Company, 1983). ISBN 0-393-01707-9.
- Brown, David, Tchaikovsky: The Years of Wandering, 1878-1885, (New York: W.W. Norton & Company, 1986). ISBN 0-393-02311-7.
- Brown, David, Tchaikovsky: The Final Years, 1885-1893, (New York: W.W. Norton & Company, 1991). ISBN 0-393-03099-7.
- Brown, David, Tchaikovsky: The Man and His Music (New York: Pegasus Books, 2007). ISBN 0-571-23194-2.
- Maes, Francis, tr. Arnold J. Pomerans and Erica Pomerans, A History of Russian Music: From Kamarinskaya to Babi Yar (Berkeley, Los Angeles and London: University of California Press, 2002). ISBN 0-520-21815-9.
- Schonberg, Harold C., Lives of the Great Composers (New York: W.W. Norton & Company, 3rd ed. 1997).
- Steinberg, Michael, The Symphony (New York and Oxford: Oxford University Press, 1995).
- Warrack, John, Tchaikovsky Symphonies and Concertos (Seattle: University of Washington Press, 1969). Library of Congress Catalog Card No. 78-105437.
- Warrack, John, Tchaikovsky (New York: Charles Scribner's Sons, 1973). SBN 684-13558-2.
- Wiley, Roland John, Tchaikovsky's Ballets (Oxford and New York: Oxford University Press, 1985). ISBN 0-19-816249-9.
