= Anna Karenina (Eifman ballet) =

Anna Karenina is a ballet choreographed by Boris Eifman, based on the 1877 novel Anna Karenina by Leo Tolstoy. The première took place in Saint Petersburg on Saturday, 2 April 2005. The music is by Pyotr Ilyich Tchaikovsky and includes excerpts from:

- Symphony No. 2 in C minor Little Russian, Op. 17
- The Tempest symphonic fantasy, Op. 18
- Francesca da Rimini symphonic fantasy, Op. 32
- Souvenir d'un lieu cher, Op. 42
  - Scherzo. Presto giocoso
- Suite No. 1 in D major, Op. 43
  - Andante sostenuto, moderato e con anima
  - Intermezzo: part 3. Andante semplice
- Serenade for Strings in C, Op. 48
  - Andante non troppo. Allegro moderato
- Suite No. 3 in G, Op. 55
- Manfred Symphony in B minor, Op. 58
- Hamlet, overture-fantasy, Op. 67a
- Souvenir de Florence, string sextet in D minor, Op. 70
  - Adagio cantabile e con moto
- Symphony No. 6 in B minor Pathetique, Op. 74
- The Voyevoda symphonic ballad, Op. 78
- Romeo and Juliet fantasy-overture

== See also ==
- List of ballets by title
