= Peter Schmalfuss =

German pianist

Peter Schmalfuss (13 January 1937 – 23 October 2008) was a German classical pianist born in Berlin, Germany.

He studied with Walter Gieseking, Adrian Aeschbacher and, at the Beethoven-Class Positano, with Wilhelm Kempff. In 1960 he began touring in Europe, North Africa, and Asia; his performing accomplishments included presenting a complete cycle of the Beethoven sonatas on consecutive evenings. At the invitation of the Chopin Society of Warsaw, Poland, of which he was a member, he performed at Chopin’s birth house in Żelazowa Wola, Poland. Schmalfuss also arranged various small festivals in which he championed neglected chamber music by Carl Maria von Weber. He did not exclude contemporary music from his attention, however; for instance, he recorded piano music by Akin Euba in 1989 and presented one of the piano sonatas by Salvatore Sciarrino at the Darmstädter Ferienkurse. Schmalfuss had a reputation as a fine sight-reader and a reliable substitute when other artists were forced to cancel appearances.

In his last year, a hand ailment prevented Schmalfuss from performing and forced him to cancel his scheduled concert appearances. He died in Darmstadt, Germany, where for more than two decades he had served as a faculty member of the Darmstadt Academy of Musical Arts. For his contributions to its cultural life, the city had awarded him a bronze service plaque.

Schmalfuss began making records in the 1960s, but he received little or no attention from major labels. His recordings released on CD, at least in the United States, appeared almost exclusively on bottom-priced, mass-market-oriented labels; nonetheless, they reveal a musical player and bear out his affinity for the music of Chopin.

== Discography ==
Some releases featuring his playing include the following:

- 1989 - Piano Music of Akin Euba, performed by Peter Schmalfuss (includes Scenes from Traditional Life and Wakar Duru: Studies in African Pianism). Elekoto Music Centre EMC LP 001
- Chopin Nocturnes Nos. 1-10 (Opp. 9, 15, 27, and 32), "World Famous Piano Music Vol. 4", Pilz Media Group, Munich, 1991, CD 160 223.
- Chopin Waltzes No.1-14 (Bechstein), Selected Sound Carrier 1997.
- Debussy Piano Works, Pilz Media Group, CD 1987
- Frédéric Chopin: The Romantic Piano. Excelsior EXL-2-4228 1994.
- Collector's Edition - The World's Greatest Composers - CHOPIN, Malacy Entertainment LP, 2008.
- Karol Szymanowski - Piano Sonatas Nos. 1 and 2 - LP
- Tchaikovsky – Piano Sonatas in G Major, op. 37, and C Sharp Minor, op. posth. 80; 12 Morceaux de difficulté moyenne, Op. 40 – no. 2, Chanson triste. Bella Musica BM 31.2399 (Bösendorfer 225)
