= Op. 16 =

In music, Op. 16 stands for Opus number 16. Compositions that are assigned this number include:

- Beethoven – Quintet for Piano and Winds
- Brahms – Serenade No. 2
- Britten – Young Apollo
- Chopin – Rondo in E-flat major
- Dvořák – String Quartet No. 7
- Enescu – Piano Quartet No. 1
- Fauré – Berceuse
- Glazunov – Symphony No. 2
- Grieg – Piano Concerto
- Prokofiev – Piano Concerto No. 2
- Saint-Saëns – Suite for Cello and Piano
- Schoenberg – Five Pieces for Orchestra
- Schumann – Kreisleriana
- Scriabin - 5 Preludes. see List of compositions by Alexander Scriabin
- Shostakovich – Tahiti Trot
- Sibelius – Spring Song (Vårsång), tone poem for orchestra (1894, revised 1895)
- Strauss – Aus Italien
- Suk – Fairy Tale
- Tchaikovsky - 6 Songs, see List of compositions by Pyotr Ilyich Tchaikovsky
- Vierne – Messe solennelle
- Zemlinsky – Eine florentinische Tragödie
