= Orchestral Suite No. 3 (Tchaikovsky) =

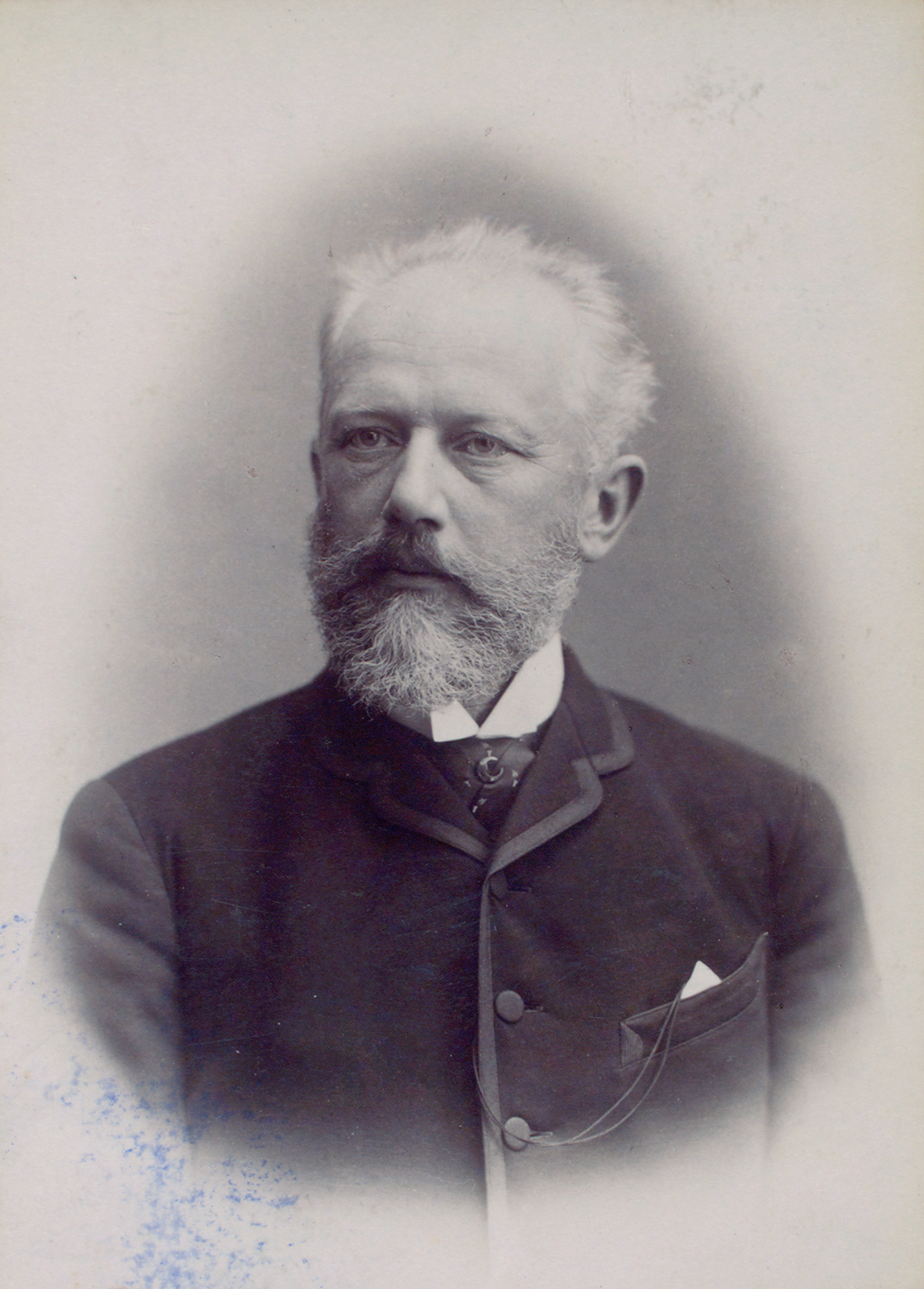
Pyotr Ilyich Tchaikovsky, c. 1888

Pyotr Ilyich Tchaikovsky composed his Orchestral Suite No. 3 in G major, Op. 55 in 1884, writing it concurrently with his Concert Fantasia in G, Op. 56, for piano and orchestra. The originally intended opening movement of the suite, Contrastes, instead became the closing movement of the fantasia. Both works were also intended initially as more mainstream compositions than they became; the fantasia was intended as a piano concerto, while the suite was conceived as a symphony.

The suite's first performance was in Saint Petersburg, Russia on January 24, 1885, under the direction of Hans von Bülow. It was dedicated to the conductor Max Erdmannsdörfer, who gave the Moscow premiere a few days later, and who had conducted the premieres of the first two suites.

== Instrumentation ==
The Orchestral Suite No. 3 calls for: 3 flutes (one of them piccolo), 2 oboes, 1 English horn, 2 clarinets (in A), 2 bassoons, 4 horns (in F), 2 trumpets (in F and D), 3 trombones, tuba, percussion (timpani, side drum, tambourine, triangle, cymbals, and bass drum), harp, and strings (violins 1 & 2, violas, celli, double basses).

== Form ==
Suite No. 3 in G major, Op 55
Sir Adrian Boult directs the Paris Conservatoire Orchestra

The suite is divided into four movements, the fourth a theme and variations longer than the other three movements combined:

1. Élégie: Andantino molto cantabile (G major)
2. Valse mélancolique: Allegro moderato (E minor)
3. Scherzo: Presto (E minor)
4. Tema con variazioni: Andante con moto (G major)

=== I. Élégie: Andantino molto cantabile ===
Wiley calls this movement "resolutely melodic". A change from B to B♭ "produces tension in the misalignment of theme and key", he comments. The first theme group returns in the key of the second, then to a bridge. He then returns to the home key and reprises the second theme group in the key of the first and follows it with a lengthy epilogue.

=== II. Valse mélancolique: Allegro moderato ===
Wiley contends that while Tchaikovsky referred to this movement as the "obligatory waltz number", it is not typical of his work in this vein. The somber character of the opening theme is exceptional and the syncopated second subject much like that in the scherzo. Wiley adds, "The unusual periodicity in long, uneven spans is acharacteristic, as is the formal pattern, a tripratite reprise that also mimics the scherzo. The unwaltz–like result, sustained for 100 bars, is enigmatic. Abbreviating the reprise makes the Trio even more striking."

=== III. Scherzo: Presto ===
The opening theme of this movement, Wiley writes, is similar to its counterpart in the Second Suite. The constant shift of timbral combinations and the tempo make this music, alternating between 6/8 and 2/4, a challenge for the orchestra. Tchaikovsky "plays with emphasis throughout", Wiley adds, "sometimes enriching the tonic triad with the addition of the sixth, creating a chord with the pitches of both chords simultaneously, and so creates a merging of G major and E minor." The orchestration of the Trio section, a march, includes snare drum and triangle.

=== IV. Tema con variazioni: Andante con moto (G major) ===
The variations are as follows:

1. Andante con moto, 2/4
2. Andante con moto, 2/4
3. Andante con moto, 2/4
4. Pochissimo meno animato, B minor
5. Allegro vivo, 3/4, G major
6. Allegro vivace, 6/8, G major
7. L'istesso tempo, 2/4, G major
8. Adagio, 3/4, A minor (closing in E major)
9. Allegro molto vivace, 2/4, A major
10. Allegro vivo e un poco rubato, 3/8, B minor
11. Moderato mosso, 4/4, B major
12. Finale. Polacca – Moderato maestoso e brillante, 3/4, G major

== Composition ==
"I meant to write a symphony, but the title is of no importance", Tchaikovsky wrote to Sergei Taneyev. When he had gone to the Davidov family estate at Kamenka in Ukraine, he had contemplated ideas for a piano concerto and a symphony. Neither plan really materialized the way the composer intended. He quickly recognized his ideas for the symphony were better suited for an orchestral suite like the two he had previously written. The problem lay with the opening movement. Titled Contrastes, it was to be a fantasia of contrasting musical sounds and patterns, not unlike the Jeu de sons movement that opened the Second Orchestral Suite. The more he worked with the music, the more recalcitrant the music became and the more he hated it. Contrastes finally found its way into the Concert Fantasia.

Tchaikovsky's original layout for the Third Suite was similar to that of his Second—a fairly large opening movement as in his first two orchestral suites, then three smaller ones and a theme–and–variations finale. The developments that Contrastes underwent, while good for the Concert Fantasia, left the suite unbalanced, with three small-scale movements followed by a theme-and-variations movement as large as all three previous movements placed together. Even without Contrastes, the suite remains a long work.

Wiley writes that Tchaikovsky composed the scherzo first. The theme-and-variation finale came last, beginning with the concluding polonaise. This, he says, might have helped the composer clarify his strategy in pacing the movement and guiding its overall momentum. He also links the theme of the finale to the other movements: "its opening chord is presented as a triad with added sixth, [which he used for the scherzo immediately preceding it] and, like the [opening] Elegie, the movement is resolutely melodic."

Wiley also says the quality of Prelest' (meaning "charming" or "pleasing") in the Third Suite "is too prominent for a symphony, while at the same time the suite's coherence advances well beyond the casual miscellency of the Second." This continuity, he suggests, "casts doubt on the freedom he so cherished when writing the First Suite six years earlier." The Third Suite, Wiley adds, is also much darker music in tone than in the two suites that preceded it.

In the fourth variation (pochissimo meno animato, B minor) of the fourth movement, a quotation of the Dies Irae theme is distinctly heard.

== Reception ==
Tchaikovsky believed the public would appreciate the new suite; of the reception at its premiere, he wrote to his patroness Nadezhda von Meck six days after the event that "reality far exceeded my expectations. I have never before experienced such a triumph. I saw that then entire mass of the audience was moved, and grateful to me. These moments are the finest adornment of the artist's life. Thanks to these it is worth living and laboring." The composer's brother Modest later claimed it was the greatest public triumph up to that point for a Russian symphonic work. The press was uniformly favorable, with the composer's friend Herman Laroche declaring Tchaikovsky's music the true music of the future. Tchaikovsky's first two orchestral suites had also been received very warmly by the public and the critics, but the composer had not attended either of their premieres.

Laroche's comment can serve as a useful reminder that what may now sound conventional was taken at the time it was written as something very fresh and original. Tchaikovsky does not plumb any new emotional depths in this work, but his level of invention is at its most inspired. The Third Suite most notably explores further the melodic and orchestral possibilities exposed in its two predecessors as well as for Tchaikovsky's return to large-scale variation form. The final movement, Tema con variazioni, is a wonderful example of the composer's creative genius and it is a locus classicus of scoring. During Tchaikovsky's lifetime it was not uncommon for him to be asked to perform this finale without the rest of the suite, such was its universal popularity; and the finale alone has been performed numerous times since.

== Selected recordings ==
- Antal Doráti conducting the New Philharmonia Orchestra
- Neeme Järvi conducting the Detroit Symphony Orchestra
- Carl Schuricht conducting the Vienna Philharmonic Orchestra (Theme and Variations only)
- Rudolf Kempe conducting the Vienna Philharmonic Orchestra (Theme and Variations only)
- Lorin Maazel conducting the Vienna Philharmonic Orchestra
- Gennady Rozhdestvensky conducting the USSR Ministry of Culture Symphony Orchestra
- Stefan Sanderling conducting the National Symphony Orchestra of Ireland

== George Balanchine's Tchaikovsky Suite No. 3 ==
In 1947, George Balanchine choreographed a setting of the Suite's final movement for Ballet Theatre (now American Ballet Theatre). Called Theme and Variations, it has remained one of his most popular ballets. In 1970, he choreographed the rest of the Suite for New York City Ballet, with the slightly revised Theme and Variations as its finale.

== Bibliography ==
- Brown, David, Tchaikovsky: The Years of Wandering, 1878-1885, (New York: W.W. Norton & Company, 1986). ISBN 0-393-02311-7.
- Brown, David, Tchaikovsky: The Man and His Music (New York: Pegasus Books, 2007). ISBN 0-571-23194-2.
- Warrack, John, Tchaikovsky (New York: Charles Scribner's Sons, 1973) ISBN 0-684-13558-2.
- Wiley, Roland John, The Master Musicians: Tchaikovsky (Oxford and New York: Oxford University Press, 2009). ISBN 978-0-19-536892-5.
- Wood, Ralph W., "Miscellaneous Orchestral Works." In Music of Tchaikovsky (New York: W.W. Norton & Company, 1946), ed. Abraham, Gerald. ISBN n/a.
