= Carl Schuricht =

German conductor (1880–1967)

- Carl Schuricht (photo with 1959 dedication)
- Occupation: conductor

Carl Adolph Schuricht (German: [ˈʃuːʁɪçt]; 3 July 1880 – 7 January 1967) was a German conductor.

== Life and career ==
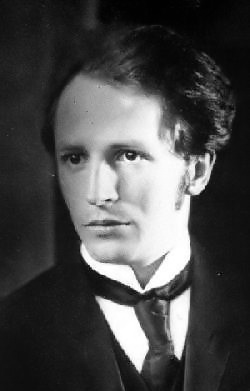
Carl Adolph Schuricht in c. 1910

Schuricht was born in Danzig (Gdańsk), German Empire; his father's family had been respected organ-builders. His mother, Amanda Wusinowska, a widow soon after her marriage (Carl's father Carl Conrad Schuricht drowned in the Baltic Sea while trying to save a friend, three weeks before he was born), brought up her son alone. His childhood was surrounded by music: "Every Sunday in summer we used to hire three large open carriages and go out into the country. After the picnic we would join in singing choral works by Bach, Handel and Mendelssohn." He showed a talent for music at an early age, studying piano and violin from the age of six. By eleven he was composing, and continued his academic and musical studies when his mother moved to Berlin, then to Wiesbaden.

At 20 he obtained the post of Korrepetitor at the Stadttheater in Mainz, and two years later won the Kuczynski Foundation prize for composition and a Felix Mendelssohn scholarship. He then returned to Berlin to study piano under Ernst Rudorff and composition with Engelbert Humperdinck, later working under Max Reger in Leipzig, publishing chamber pieces, sonatas and lieder. Attracted by the profession of conductor he undertook tours in Germany conducting operettas, operas, choral societies and symphony concerts. During this time he had the chance to watch at rehearsal and in concert such legendary interpreters as Arthur Nikisch, Felix Weingartner, Ernst von Schuch, Felix Mottl, Hans Richter, Karl Muck and Gustav Mahler.

On 24 May 1906 he heard Frederick Delius's Sea Drift in Essen with the composer present, and promised to Delius that when he had his own orchestra he would conduct it himself, which he did in Frankfurt with Delius again in the audience. More important was perhaps that at the same Festival in 1906 he heard the premiere of Mahler's Sixth Symphony, conducted by the composer. In 1909 he succeeded Siegfried Ochs as director of the Rühlscher Oratorienverein in Frankfurt-am-Main and at 40 was appointed musical director of the municipal orchestra in Wiesbaden; festivals of modern music (Richard Strauss, Reger, Mahler, Delius and Arnold Schoenberg) made Wiesbaden an internationally renowned center for music. Schuricht said of this time, "The German public was no more avid than any other for the novelties I wanted to give it. I have to prepare it for them gently, convince without bludgeoning, cajole and seduce. I managed this by prefacing concerts of modern music by lectures, which I illustrated with extracts played by myself at the piano or by the orchestra."

His career was not exactly that of a star, but he was loved both by his orchestra players and audiences. As music director in Wiesbaden (1920-1944) he arranged the first German "Gustav Mahler-Festival" in April 1921, conducting Mahler's symphonies Nos. 2, 3, 5, 6, 7 and "Das Lied von der Erde" (cf. Signale für die musikalische Welt, No. 14, 6 April 1921, p. 384); and a week later the Berlin Philharmonic invited him to Berlin, where he conducted Mahler's Sixth symphony on May 2, 1921. Mahler's works were very popular in Germany, Holland and Austria during the 1920s, but were eventually banned under the Nazis between 1933 and 1945 owing to the composer's Jewish origin. Schuricht continued to conduct Mahler outside Germany. On October 5, 1939, during the so-called Phony War, his conducting with the Amsterdam Concertgebouw Orchestra of Mahler's Das Lied von der Erde was disrupted by a woman heckler who called out "Deutschland über alles, Herr Schuricht!" (This performance is available on a CD.) Schuricht was the first recipient of the Gold Medal of the Internationale Gustav Mahler-Gesellschaft in Vienna in 1958. Schuricht worked at the Hague/Scheveningen Festival from 1930 to 1939, and was guest conductor of the Dresden Philharmonic from 1942 to 1944. He was expected to take over as director of the orchestra on October 1, 1944, but escalation of the war ended the orchestra's activities. Schuricht himself received a warning that he was about to be arrested, and fled to Switzerland. He settled in Zürich, where he married Maria Martha Banz and conducted l'Orchestre de la Suisse Romande.

During the late 1940s and 1950s Schuricht conducted throughout Switzerland, at the re-opening of the Salzburg Festival in 1946, in Paris, and at the festivals of Holland, Lucerne, Aix-en-Provence and Montreux. He regularly conducted the South German Radio Symphony Orchestra from 1950 to 1966. When the Vienna Philharmonic first toured the US, in 1956, Schuricht replaced the recently deceased Erich Kleiber, sharing the conducting during the six weeks with André Cluytens.

He died at the age of 86 in his home at Corseaux-sur-Vevey, Switzerland, and was buried in Wiesbaden, as an honorary citizen of that city.

== Recordings ==
- Ludwig van Beethoven: Symphonies Nos. 1-9, recorded 1957 & 1958 with the Paris Conservatory Orchestra (EMI)
- Johannes Brahms: Symphony No. 1, with the Frankfurt Radio Symphony (Melodram)
- Johannes Brahms: Symphony No. 4, recorded 1963 with the Bavarian State Radio Orchestra (Concert Hall)
- Anton Bruckner: Symphony No. 5, with the Vienna Philharmonic (Deutsche Grammophon)
- Anton Bruckner: Symphony No. 7, with the Berlin Philharmonic (Polydor)
- Anton Bruckner: Symphony No. 8, with the Vienna Philharmonic (EMI)
- Anton Bruckner: Symphony No. 9, with the Vienna Philharmonic (EMI)
- Gustav Mahler: Symphony No. 3, with the Stuttgart Radio Symphony Orchestra (Archiphon)
- Wolfgang Amadeus Mozart: Requiem, recorded 1962 with the Vienna Philharmonic (Archiphon)
- Franz Schubert: Symphony No. 8 "Unfinished", with the Vienna Philharmonic (Decca)
- Robert Schumann: Symphonies 2 & 3, Overture, Scherzo and Finale, recorded 1953 & 1954 with the Orchestre de la Société des Concerts du Conservatoire, Paris (Decca)
- Felix Mendelssohn: Overtures (The Hebrides, Meeresstille und glückliche Fahrt, Die Schöne Melusine and Ruy Blas), with the Vienna Philharmonic, 1954 (Decca)
- Pyotr Ilyich Tchaikovsky: Capriccio Italien, Suite No 3 'Theme and Variations', recorded 1952 with the Orchestre de la Société des Concerts du Conservatoire, Paris (Decca)
- Richard Wagner: Orchestral excerpts, with the Paris Conservatoire Orchestra (1954, Decca), and SWR Stuttgart Radio Symphony Orchestra

== Awards and decorations ==
- Order of the Phoenix (Greece, 1936)
- Commander of the Order of Orange-Nassau (Netherlands, 1938)
- War Merit Cross, 2nd class without Swords (1944)
- Dutch Bruckner Medal 1948
- Anton Bruckner Medal of the International Bruckner Society (1950)
- Great Cross of Merit of the Federal Republic of Germany (1953)
- Honorary Citizen of Wiesbaden (1953)
- Goethe Medal of the State of Hessen (1955)
- Nicolai Medal (Vienna Philharmonic, 1956)
- Honorary Member of the Bruckner Society of America (1957)
- Appointed Professor by the President of the Republic of Austria, Adolf Schärf (1957)
- Honorary Member of the Vienna Philharmonic (1960)
- Grand Cross of the Order of Alfonso X, the Wise (1965)
