= Max Erdmannsdörfer =

German conductor, pianist and composer

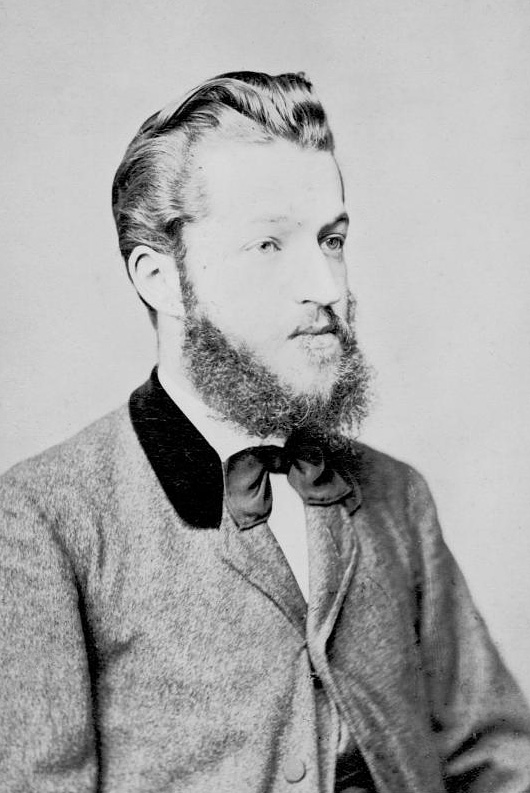
Max Erdmannsdörfer pictured by W. Hoeffert

Max Erdmannsdörfer (14 June 1848 – 14 February 1905) (sometimes seen as Max von Erdmannsdörfer) was a German conductor, pianist and composer.

He was born in Nuremberg. He studied at the Leipzig Conservatory, becoming concertmaster at Sondershausen. In 1874 he married the pianist and composer Pauline Fichtner, a student of Franz Liszt. She later used the professional name Pauline Erdmannsdörfer-Fichtner. Erdmannsdörfer corresponded with Liszt, and he premiered Liszt’s symphonic poem Hamlet at Sondershausen on 2 July 1876. He also once owned at least parts of the score of Liszt's lost Piano Concerto No. 3, which was finally pieced together only in 1989 from separate manuscript pages that had been dispersed as far afield as Weimar, Nuremberg and Leningrad. Max Erdmannsdörfer also had an association with Joachim Raff. He and Pauline were the co-dedicatees of the two-piano version of Raff's Piano Quintet, Op. 107, and they premiered it at Sondershausen on 22 September 1877. In 1870, Pauline had been the dedicatee of Raff’s Piano Suite in G minor. Erdmannsdörfer completed Raff's unfinished Symphony No. 11, Op. 214, after its composer's death, and had it published.

He premiered Sir Alexander Mackenzie’s overture Cervantes at Sondershausen in 1877.

In 1882 he became the principal conductor of the Russian Musical Society concerts in Moscow, and professor at the Moscow Conservatory. He and his wife remained there until 1889.

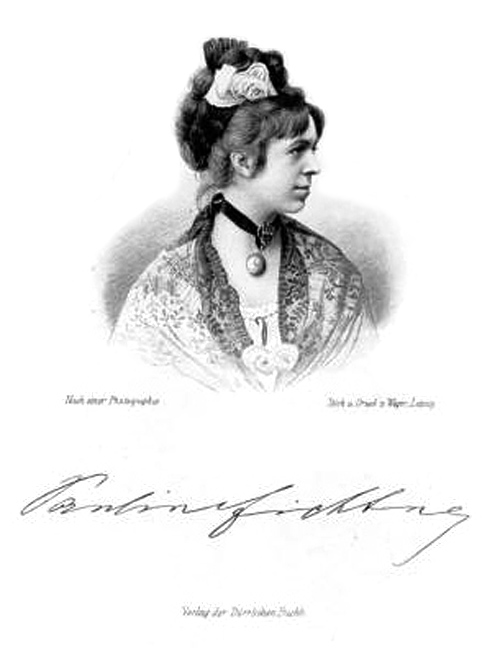
Pauline Fichtner engraved by A. Weger

He had a significant association with Pyotr Ilyich Tchaikovsky. While Tchaikovsky wrote that Erdmannsdörfer was "inclined to indulge the public's taste of exaggerated nuances" and "offhanded in his attitude to Russian music (except my own)", he nevertheless considered him "a very skilful, experienced and expert conductor". Tchaikovsky permitted him to conduct the following premiere performances of his works, all in Moscow:

- Symphony No. 1 (revised version, 1 December 1883)
- Festival Overture on the Danish National Anthem (1 December 1883)
- Suite No. 2 (16 February 1884; Tchaikovsky had just attended the premiere of his opera Mazeppa the night before, and was in such a nervous state that he set out for Berlin and Paris on 16 February, without even remaining to hear the premiere of the Suite No. 2, which absence caused Erdmannsdörfer some offence.)
- Concert Fantasia (6 March 1885)
- Manfred symphony (11 March 1886).

Tchaikovsky's Suite No. 3 is dedicated to Erdmannsdörfer, who gave the Moscow premiere in January 1885, a few days after the world premiere in Saint Petersburg under Hans von Bülow. One source says Erdmannsdörfer conducted the premiere of Tchaikovsky's Serenade for Strings, Op. 48, but other sources say it was Eduard Nápravník (Saint Petersburg, 30 October 1881). It is possible Erdmannsdörfer conducted the Moscow premiere.

Tchaikovsky so highly valued Erdmannsdörfer's arrangement of his Chant sans paroles, Op. 2, No. 3, from Souvenir de Hapsal that he himself conducted it in 1892. Erdmannsdörfer also orchestrated piano pieces by Anton Rubinstein. His own compositions are forgotten now.

After returning to Germany in 1889, the couple settled in Bremen and in 1896 moved to Munich.

Erdmannsdörfer supported the introduction of the five-stringed double bass invented by Carl Otho.
