= Piano Sonata in C-sharp minor =

Piano Sonata in C-sharp minor may refer to:

- Piano Sonata No. 14 (Beethoven), Piano sonata written by Beethoven in 1801
- Piano Sonata in C-sharp minor, D 655 (Schubert)
- Piano Sonata in C-sharp minor (Tchaikovsky)
