= Iosif Kotek =

Russian composer and musician

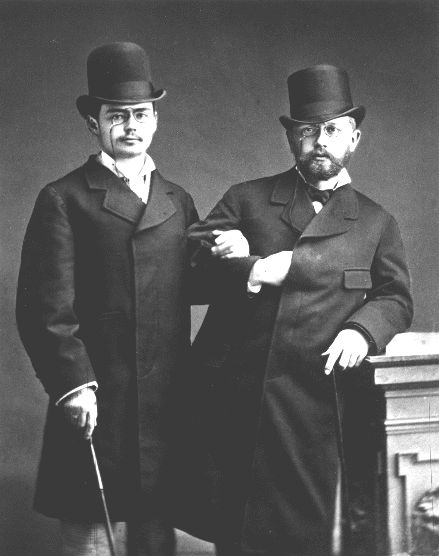
Iosif Kotek with Pyotr Ilyich Tchaikovsky, 1877

Iosif Iosifovich Kotek, also seen as Josef or Yosif (Russian: Иосиф Иосифович Котек, Iosif Iosifovič Kotek; 6 November [O.S. 25 October] 1855 – 4 January 1885), was a Russian violinist and composer remembered for his association with Pyotr Ilyich Tchaikovsky. He assisted Tchaikovsky with technical difficulties in the writing of the solo part in his Violin Concerto in D.

== Biography ==
Iosif Kotek was born in Kamenets-Podolsk, Russian Empire, in 1855, the son of a Czech father and a Russian mother. He studied violin under Jan Hřímalý at the Moscow Conservatory, where he was also a composition student of Tchaikovsky. From the outset, their attraction was mutual. He held Tchaikovsky's music in the highest regard, and he was the composer's favourite pupil.

Tchaikovsky was infatuated with his student—he called him "Kotik", Russian for little tomcat—and it has been conjectured by some (and asserted unambiguously by others) that they became lovers. They certainly became physically very affectionate, as demonstrated in Tchaikovsky's 1876 letter to his brother Modest about Kotek: "When he caresses me with his hand, when he lies with his head inclined on my breast, and I run my hand through his hair and secretly kiss it ... passion rages within me with such unimaginable strength ... Yet I am far from the desire for a physical bond. I feel that if this happened, I would cool towards him. It would be unpleasant for me if this marvellous youth debased himself to copulation with an ageing and fat-bellied man."

Kotek graduated in 1876. At that time, a wealthy widow and patron named Nadezhda von Meck asked the conservatory to provide a violinist to join her household to play chamber music and other pieces. She had eleven children, and also had a large staff including personal physicians and various musicians. Nikolai Rubinstein recommended Kotek. Von Meck had already heard some of Tchaikovsky’s music, and liked it, and it was at Kotek’s suggestion that she contacted Tchaikovsky with a commission for some new violin pieces. Kotek also made her aware of Tchaikovsky's impecunious financial circumstances. Thus started what would become one of the most remarkable artistic liaisons in musical history, a period of 14 years during which she supported him financially to become a full-time composer with no need to teach to earn a living—but they were never to meet in person. For a period, Kotek played the role of an intermediary between Nadezhda and Tchaikovsky.

In early 1877, Tchaikovsky wrote his Valse-Scherzo in C for Kotek, who may have orchestrated some or all of it. He dedicated it to Kotek on publication in 1878.

Tchaikovsky married Antonina Miliukova on 18 July 1877. Alexander Poznansky states that Tchaikovsky and Kotek were in an intimate relationship at the time, and his letters to his family prior to the wedding indeed display a great sense of concern about Kotek’s welfare, compared with almost total indifference to the woman he was about to marry. The sole witnesses at the wedding were his brother Anatoly and Iosif Kotek. Tchaikovsky also deposited with his publisher P. Jurgenson an amount of money he had received from his patroness, to be made available to Kotek should he need it. The Tchaikovsky–Miliukova marriage was doomed from the start, and they soon separated; Tchaikovsky also made a half-hearted suicide attempt. Iosif Kotek was involved in an elaborate subterfuge to keep the details of these developments from Tchaikovsky’s wider circle, including his parents. This assistance only deepened the mutual attachment the composer and the violinist had for each other.

However, Kotek was not homosexual, perhaps not even primarily so. He was engaged in a series of amorous episodes with women in Nadezhda von Meck's large household, which caused her to become markedly cold towards him. He asked her for some financial assistance, but she refused. Tchaikovsky instead came to his aid, despite having been accused by Kotek of having revealed to her the true nature of their relationship. He had also contracted syphilis. After his dismissal by Nadezhda von Meck, Kotek went to Berlin to study with Joseph Joachim.

In 1878, still recovering from the breakdown of his disastrous marriage and his subsequent suicide attempt, Tchaikovsky went to stay at Nadezhda von Meck's estate at Clarens, Switzerland, along with Modest and Kolya Konradi. They arrived there on 9 March, after which Kotek was summoned from Berlin. He arrived on 14 March carrying a swag of new music for violin, including Édouard Lalo's Symphonie espagnole, which he and Tchaikovsky played through to great delight. This gave Tchaikovsky the idea of writing a violin concerto, and he immediately set aside his current work on his Piano Sonata in G major and started on the concerto on 17 March. Kotek gave Tchaikovsky the benefit of his technical advice, and they would play through each new section as it was composed. The composer wrote: "How lovingly [Kotek] busies himself with my concerto! It goes without saying that I would have been able to do nothing without him. He plays it marvelously!" The whole process was finished on 28 March. On 3 April they gave the work a complete run-through, but neither of the Tchaikovsky brothers nor Kotek were satisfied with the Andante middle movement. It was quickly discarded (and later published separately as the Méditation in his Souvenir d'un lieu cher, Op. 42), with a new slow movement being composed in a single day, 5 April. The orchestration was finished by 11 April.

Tchaikovsky wanted to dedicate the concerto to Kotek, but felt constrained by the gossip this would undoubtedly cause about the true nature of his feelings for the younger man. (He was always at pains to conceal his homosexuality from the general public.)

At the end of 1878, Kotek and Tchaikovsky renewed their friendship in Paris, but Tchaikovsky was deeply irritated by Kotek’s "unbelievable womanizing", and even said he found his company "more unpleasant than pleasant". In November 1879 he saw Kotek again in Berlin, but still found him more tiresome than attractive.

In October 1879, the German government offered two Mendelssohn Scholarships, one for composition, the other for practical musicianship. Kotek was the winner of the latter; the former was won by Engelbert Humperdinck. That year, Kotek contributed to the arrangement for solo voices, chorus and piano of Tchaikovsky’s opera The Maid of Orleans.

In 1881, Tchaikovsky asked Kotek to perform the Violin Concerto. He refused. The work had finally been premiered that year in Vienna by Adolph Brodsky, to a notoriously scathing review from Eduard Hanslick and a muted audience response. Kotek did not want to be publicly associated with the work as it was likely to bring, as he believed, his own name into artistic disrepute. This refusal spelled the final end of their friendship. When he was in Berlin in 1883, Tchaikovsky toyed with the idea of visiting Kotek, but decided against it.

Kotek continued his studies with Joseph Joachim in Berlin until 1882, and then became a teacher at the Hochschule für Musik.

His health deteriorated in 1884 due to tuberculosis and he went to Davos, Switzerland, for treatment. Tchaikovsky put aside their differences and visited him there in November 1884, ministering to him in various ways for six days, before returning to Moscow. He considered going back when he heard Kotek was gravely ill, but decided against it. Iosif Kotek died on 4 January 1885, aged only 29. Tchaikovsky was informed by telegraph, and had the painful task of informing Kotek's parents of their son's death.

Kotek's compositions include "Six Practical Studies for the Violin", Op. 8.

Tchaikovsky died on 6 November 1893, which would have been Iosif Kotek's 38th birthday.

== Works ==
Chamber music

- 3 Violinstücke (3 Violin Pieces) for violin and piano, Op. 1 (1880)

1. Barcarola
2. Intermezzo
3. Capriccio

- Valse-Caprice in E♭ major for violin and piano, Op. 2 (1880)
- Romance élégiaque in B minor for violin and piano, Op. 4 (1881)
- Série de Morceaux caractéristiques for 2 violins and piano, Op. 5 (1881)

1. Fughetta
2. Polonaise
3. Duo d'amour
4. L'Espagnola
5. Rêverie
6. Scherzo

- 6 praktische Studien (6 Practical Studies) for violin, Op. 8 (1883)
- Arioso in D minor for violin and piano or organ, Op. 9 (1883)
- 3 Stücke (3 Pieces) for violin and piano, Op. 10 (1885)

1. Melodie
2. Notturno
3. Walzer

Vocal

- 3 Lieder for mezzo-soprano and piano, Op. 6 (1882)

1. Wiegenlied "Du liebes Kind, nun schlumm're sacht"
2. "Lebe wohl, du blaue See"
3. Junges Blut "Hätt' ich's nimmer doch gedacht"

== Sources ==
- Alexander Poznansky, Tchaikovsky: The Quest for the Inner Man
