= Akin Euba =

Nigerian musician (1935–2020)

- Born: Olatunji Akin Euba; 28 April 1935; Lagos, Nigeria
- Died: 14 April 2020 (aged 84)
- Education: Trinity College of Music; University of California, Los Angeles; University of Ghana
- Occupations: Composer, musicologist, and pianist

Olatunji Akin Euba (28 April 1935 – 14 April 2020) was a Nigerian composer, musicologist, and pianist.

== Career ==
Born on 28 April 1935 in Lagos, Nigeria, Akin Euba studied composition with Arnold Cooke at the Trinity College of Music, London, obtaining the diplomas of fellow of the Trinity College London (Composition) and fellow of the Trinity College London (Piano). He was awarded a Rockefeller Foundation Fellowship in 1962. He received B.A. and M.A. degrees from the University of California, Los Angeles, where he studied with Mantle Hood, Charles Seeger, J. H. Kwabena Nketia, Klaus Wachsmann, and Roy Travis. He held a Ph.D. in ethnomusicology from the University of Ghana, Legon (1974). While at Legon, Euba's doctoral work was supervised by Professor Nketia, and his dissertation is titled "Dundun Music of the Yoruba".

Euba was professor and director of the Centre for Cultural Studies at the University of Lagos, and also served as a senior research fellow at the University of Ife (now Obafemi Awolowo University) in Nigeria. He served as head of music at the Nigerian Broadcasting Corporation for five years. He was a research scholar and artist in residence at IWALEWA House, the African studies center of the University of Bayreuth in Germany between 1986 and 1992. He was the Andrew Mellon Professor of Music at the University of Pittsburgh between 1993 and 2011 and until his death, was the Andrew W. Mellon Professor, Emeritus in music; the founder and director of the Centre for Intercultural Music Arts, London (founded in 1989), and director emeritus of the Centre for Intercultural Musicology at Churchill College, University of Cambridge.

Euba's scholarly interests included the musicology and ethnomusicology of modern interculturalism. He organized regular symposia on music in Africa and the Diaspora at Churchill College, Cambridge as well as the Central Conservatory of Music in Beijing. These events featured such notable composers and scholars as J. H. Kwabena Nketia and Halim El-Dabh. With his Elekoto Ensemble, he brought together musicians from Nigeria, China, India, Germany, Malta, and the United States.

His compositions involve a synthesis of African traditional material (often from his own ethnic group, the Yoruba people) and contemporary classical music. His most ambitious composition is the opera Chaka: An Opera in Two Chants (1970), which blends West African percussion and atenteben flutes with twelve-tone technique.

Euba died on 14 April 2020, two weeks short of his 85th birthday.

== Works ==
- Six Yoruba Folk Songs, arranged for voice and piano
- 1956 – Introduction and Allegro, orchestra
- 1963 – Five Pieces for English Horn and Piano for Derek Bell
- 1964 – Four Pictures from Oyo Calabashes
- 1964 – Impressions From an Akwete Cloth, piano
- 1967 – Morning, Noon, and Night, singers, dancers, and Nigerian instruments
- 1967 – Olurounbi (or Olurombi), Symphonic study for Orchestra
- 1970 (rev. 1999) – Chaka, Opera
- 1970 – Ice Cubes, string orchestra
- 1970 – Scenes From Traditional Life, piano
- 1975 – Alatangana, ballet for singers, dancers, and Nigerian instruments
- 1979 – Black Bethlehem, soloists, chorus, Nigerian drums, and jazz ensemble
- 1987 – Wakar Duru: Studies in African Pianism 1–3, piano
- 2003 – Below Rusumo Falls, voice, dancer, kayagum, flute, drums, and piano (text: Olusola Oyeleye)
- 2011 - "emem was born into the world

== Discography ==
- 1989 – Piano Music of Akin Euba, performed by Peter Schmalfuss (includes Scenes from Traditional Life and Wakar Duru: Studies in African Pianism)
- 1999 – Chaka: An Opera in Two Chants, from an epic poem by Léopold Sédar Senghor. Point Richmond, California, United States: Music Research Institute MRI-001CD.
- 2005 – Towards an African Pianism: An Anthology of Keyboard Music From Africa and the Diaspora. Vol. 1. Pittsburgh, Pennsylvania, United States: A Bridge Across: Intercultural Composition, Performance, Musicology, Department of Music, University of Pittsburgh, ABA 001 CD.
- 2005 – Towards an African Pianism: An Anthology of Keyboard Music From Africa and the Diaspora. Vol. 2. Pittsburgh, Pennsylvania, United States: A Bridge Across: Intercultural Composition, Performance, Musicology, Department of Music, University of Pittsburgh, ABA 002 CD.

== Writings ==
- Euba, Akin (1970). "Music Adapts to a Changed World: A Leading Composer Looks at How Africa's Musical Traditions Have Expanded to Suit Contemporary Society." Africa Report, November 1970, pp. 24–27.
- Euba, Akin (1989). "Yoruba Music in the Church: The Development of a Neo-African Art Among the Yoruba of Nigeria." In African Musicology: Current Trends: A Festschrift Presented to J. H. Kwabena Nketia, ed. J. C. DjeDje and W. G. Carter (Atlanta, Georgia), pp. 45–63.
