= Dream on the Volga =

Opera by Anton Arensky

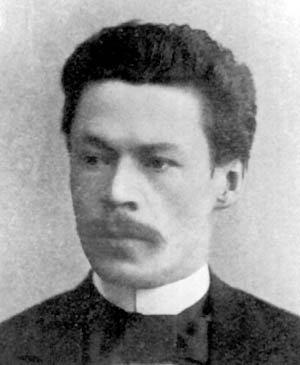
Anton Arensky, the composer of Dream on the Volga

Dream on the Volga (Russian: Сон на Волге) is an opera in four acts composed by Anton Arensky. The libretto was adapted by Arensky from Alexander Ostrovsky's melodrama Voyevoda. The opera premiered on January 2, 1891 at the Bolshoi Theatre in Moscow with Arensky conducting.

== Background ==
Dream on the Volga was Arensky's first opera. He began working on it while still a student in Rimsky-Korsakov's composition class at the St. Petersburg Conservatory and finished it in 1890. Tchaikovsky, whose music also had a significant influence on Arensky, had twenty years earlier adapted the Ostrovsky play as an opera, The Voyevoda. However, Tchaikovsky was so dissatisfied with his own version that he later destroyed the manuscript score. Arensky's version was a much closer adaptation of the play than Tchaikovsky's which had condensed Ostrovsky's original five acts down to three. Tchaikovsky wrote to his brother Modest that he had not been very impressed when Arensky had played him fragments of the opera in St. Petersburg, but after going through the completed score in the summer of 1890 and then after seeing the premiere, he was convinced that it was one of the best Russian operas. He considered the music "very elegant" but went on to say that if it had one defect it was "a certain monotony of method" which reminded him of Rimsky-Korsakov.

Igor Stravinsky, a later student of Rimsky-Korsakov, recalled attending a performance of Dream on the Volga in St. Petersburg with him. Stravinsky claimed to have found the music dull, and that during a bass clarinet solo intended to evoke a sinister atmosphere, Rimsky-Korsakov loudly commented, "the noble bass clarinet should not be put to such ignominious use." However, the musicologist Richard Taruskin has cast doubt on the veracity of Stravinsky's anecdote, noting that the sole performance of the opera in St. Petersburg was in 1903, a time when it was unlikely that they were close enough to have been attending performances together. Taruskin also points out that Vasily Yastrebtsev wrote in his Reminiscences of Rimsky-Korsakov that one day in 1903 he had found the composer "leafing through Dream on the Volga and sincerely admiring many pages [...] 'Nowadays,' he said no one writes like this anymore; it smacks of something irretrievable.'"

== Synopsis ==
The story revolves around an elderly Voyevoda (Provincial Governor) who falls in love with two young women and ruthlessly imprisons them. The first woman is married and the second is engaged to another man. After initial failed attempts by their partners to rescue them, the women are eventually freed when a new Voyevoda is appointed.

== Recordings ==
There are no complete recordings of Dream on the Volga. However, its overture can be heard on several recordings of Arensky's works including:

- Arensky: Symphony 2; Suite 3; Dream on the Volga Overture; Nal & Damayanti Prelude; Intermezzo – BBC Philharmonic, Vassily Sinaisky (conductor). Label: Chandos 10024
- Svetlanov Conducts Arensky, Vol 3 – Russian State Academic Symphony Orchestra, Yevgeny Svetlanov (conductor). Label: Svetlanov Foundation 3
