= Orchestral Suite No. 2 (Tchaikovsky) =

1883 composition by Piotr Tchaikovsky

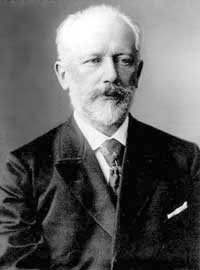
Pyotr Ilyich Tchaikovsky

Pyotr Ilyich Tchaikovsky composed his Orchestral Suite No. 2 in C major, Op. 53, in 1883. It was premiered on February 16, 1884, at a Russian Musical Society concert in Moscow, conducted by Max Erdmannsdörfer. The piece was well enough received to be repeated a week later. It is dedicated to his brother Anatoly's wife, Praskovya Vladimirovna Tchaikovskaya.

== Structure ==
The suite is written in five movements.

1. Jeu de sons: Andantino un poco rubato
2. Valse: Moderato tempo di valse
3. Scherzo burlesque: Vivace, con spirito
4. Rêves d'enfant: Andante molto sostenuto
5. Danse baroque: Vivacissimo

=== I. Jeu de sons: Andantino un poco rubato ===
This movement is a sonata structure with a slow introduction which recurs at the end to round off the piece. The Jeu (Play) here is simply between string phrases whose endings are echoed by the woodwinds. However, when the fast movement begins, the constant changes of texture, accompanied by matching quick shifts between string and wind tones, are noticeable. The development is a fugue based on the opening of the first theme. It dovetails with the recapitulation, the first subject passing straight into the more melodic second.

=== II. Valse: Moderato tempo di valse ===
Unlike Tchaikovsky's previous waltzes, the theme is more animated and wide-ranging and includes changes in pace which would create havoc in a ballet performance. What is most notable, though, is not the tune but the orchestration. Tchaikovsky is now introducing in both texture and tone color a more unobtrusive variety into the accompaniment than would be noticed in a ballet where the attention is divided between stage and music.

=== III. Scherzo burlesque: Vivace, con spirito ===
This movement is more ostentatiously brilliant than the Valse and includes a part for a quartet of accordions. The overall impression is of fragments of melody flying around in all directions, their individuality asserted by their being well spaced out in the texture, often by their contrasting orchestral colors. Minute melodic fragments, even sound dots of one-note jabs from woodwinds or pizzicatos from strings, add their own accents. The bold folksong-like tune in the central section could hardly be a greater contrast.

=== IV. Rêves d'enfant: Andante molto sostenuto ===
At first a reassuring lullaby, this music diverts into some of the most strange, even unnerving that Tchaikovsky would write in depicting the kingdom of sleep, with strange, delicate, fragmented textures with no recognizable harmonic foundation. At the end of this section there is a pause, and the lullaby resumes as it had begun.

=== V. Danse baroque: Vivacissimo ===
The name may seem strange for this earthy music, but Tchaikovsky is using the term "baroque" in its original meaning of "quaint" or "grotesque". The subtitle "Wild dance in imitation of Dargomyzhsky" is more helpful. The model for this music is the earlier Russian composer's Kazachok or "Cossack Dance".

== Instrumentation ==
The music is scored for the following:

Woodwinds

piccolo
3 flutes
2 oboes
1 English horn
2 clarinets (C and A)
2 bassoons

Brass

4 horns in F
2 trumpets (C and E)
3 trombones
1 tuba

Percussion

timpani
triangle
glockenspiel
cymbals
bass drum

Miscellaneous

4 accordions (ad libitum)

Strings

harp

violins
violas
cellos
double basses

== Overview ==
=== Composition ===
Tchaikovsky spent the late spring and early summer of 1883 with his brother Anatoly after spending some hectic months before that writing first his opera Mazeppa, then a march and the cantata Moscow for the coronation of Alexander III as tsar. Anatoly, now contentedly married and recently a father, had rented a house at Podushkino, near Moscow. Tchaikovsky found the house's location to be attractive and he often roamed the surrounding woods, picking mushrooms. He spent three months at Podushkino, two of them correcting proofs to Mazeppa but also finding time to sketch out his Second Orchestral Suite.

When Tchaikovsky left Podushkino on September 13 to visit his sister Alexandra at her estate at Kamenka in Ukraine, his priority was to finish this suite. He spent two and a half months at Kamenka. The first five weeks of that time, six hours a day, were spent finishing the composition of and scoring the suite. He had explained to his patroness Nadezhda von Meck at the beginning of September that if the work were not completed by the beginning of the winter concert season, he would not be able to find out how the work sounded during his time in Moscow. He was most anxious to do so, he explained, "because I have used some new orchestral combinations which interest me greatly." The fact that he took more than five weeks to complete orchestrating the work, despite his sometimes working six hours a day on it, shows the great care he took over this operation.

Tchaikovsky finished the suite on October 25. Max Erdmannsdörfer conducted the work the following February in Moscow. However, if the composer's eagerness to hear the work were still present, he likely satisfied it during rehearsal. The tensions of supervising the Moscow premiere of Mazeppa, which took place the night before the suite's first performance, had tried him severely, and he left for the West to recover before the suite had been played. Erdmannsdörfer was offended by the composer's inability to wait one extra day before leaving.

=== Reception ===
The critics were unanimous in their praise for the Suite. They referred to its verve, its deftness of instrumentation, its ingenuity of structure and its wealth of melodic invention.

=== Analysis ===
Texture rather than form was Tchaikovsky's concern when composing the Second Orchestral Suite, making it very different from its predecessor. One interesting point about the opening movement, Jeu de sons (Play of sounds), according to scholars is that the names of Tchaikovsky's brother Anatoly, his wife and daughter are encrypted in this movement. The cipher system the composer used is similar to one later employed by Maurice Ravel and Claude Debussy. In this system, the seven notes of the diatonic scale are matched with letters of the alphabet by assigning each letter in order of pitch, starting with every eighth letter until all letters have been used. The resulting theme is not characteristic of Tchaikovsky, reinforcing the idea that the composer worked more often by calculation than he did by inspiration. Unfortunately, working out of this theme in counterpoint which occupies so much of this movement makes it no more appealing for listening than its counterpart in the First Orchestral Suite.

The other movements are not only more fascinating to hear but also form a collective landmark in Tchaikovsky's development as a composer. Previously his orchestration, albeit excellent, remained generalized when it came to exploiting individual tone colors. Even in the March of the First Suite, each section exploited a single sound world, not multiple ones. This changed in the Second Orchestral Suite. Tchaikovsky now aimed for a greater degree of particularization. Tone colors became more vivid, contrasts fiercer, backgrounds idiomatically designed as strikingly projected accompaniments. He worked to refine and detail his sound world to the point that whole parameters of his compositional technique demanded reevaluation.

One change, apparent in the Valse, was a pronounced shift in melody. Previously, Tchaikovsky had composed his melodies in 16-bar increments, accompanied by a limited range of harmonic accompaniment. His intent in this Valse of including brisk and varied color changes prompted him to do two things. First, he widened the contrasts in melodic character between different 16-bar periods. Second, he absorbed a variety into the main melodic line that had previously been provided by subordinate fragments; this allowed him to make the melody reinforce the extra diversity in color.

This modification of melody is modest when compared to the transformation of texture in the first section of the Scherzo burlesque. In the First Suite was a functional bass line, explicit harmonic support and solid, if stodgy, counterpoint. This was all replaced with a mercurial polyphony from which a large variety of textures could be imagined, from a single line and two-part counterpoint to tutti chords. Sometimes the harmony would barely be sketched in this textural web, but this web's flexibility, along with different combinations of instruments, guaranteed an endless variety of sounds. Tchaikovsky's achievement in this breakthrough was that he was able to employ it so discriminately.

This discrimination is most apparent in the fourth movement, Rêves d'enfant, which contains both the most conventional and most daring music in the entire suite. The harmonic support for this gently berceuse remains orthodox enough in its opening half. Towards the middle of the piece, textures become so fragmented and chromatically ornamented that their harmonic foundation remains elusive. Only at the end of each phrase does a triad played on the harp bring a brief stability. This passage is totally unprecedented in Tchaikovsky's work and seems to leap ahead to the next century. Even in the enchantment music of The Sleeping Beauty, which would follow it, there would not be quite the same disquieting sense of the unknown as Tchaikovsky displays here.

== Selected recordings ==
- Antal Doráti conducting the New Philharmonia Orchestra (part of the first complete recording of all 4 suites)
- Neeme Järvi conducting the Detroit Symphony Orchestra
- Stefan Sanderling conducting the RTÉ National Symphony Orchestra
