= The Voyevoda (opera) =

Opera by Pyotr Ilyich Tchaikovsky

- Opera by Tchaikovsky
- Cover of P. Yurgenson's edition of four-hand transcription of the Overture
- Native title: Russian: Воево́да
- Librettist: Alexander Ostrovsky
- Language: Russian
- Based on: The Voyevoda (A Dream on the Volga) by Ostrovsky
- Premiere: 11 February 1869; Bolshoi Theatre in Moscow

The Voyevoda (Russian: Воево́да), Op. 3, is an opera in 3 acts and 4 scenes, by Pyotr Ilyich Tchaikovsky with a libretto written by Alexander Ostrovsky and based on his play The Voyevoda (A Dream on the Volga) (Russian: Воевода (Сон на Волге)).

The opera was composed between March 1867 and July 1868, and it received its first performance on 11 February [OS January 30] 1869 at the Bolshoi Theatre in Moscow. It was a benefit for Alexandra Menshikova.

In the 1870s Tchaikovsky destroyed the manuscript full score of the opera, while recycling much of the first act in his The Oprichnik (1870–1872). The subject of The Voyevoda was thus left available to his former pupil Anton Arensky to compose as the opera Dream on the Volga in 1888. Decades later, during the Soviet period, The Voyevoda was posthumously reconstructed from surviving orchestral and vocal parts and the composer's sketches.

== Roles ==
Role	Voice type	Premiere cast 11 February [OS 30 January] 1869 Conductor: Eduard Merten)
Nechay Shalïgin, the voyevoda	bass	Finokki
Vlas Dyuzhoy, a wealthy merchant	bass	Radonezhsky
Marya Vlasyevna, his wife	soprano	Alexandra Menshikova
Praskovya Vlasyevna, his older daughter	soprano	Kronenberg
Nastasya	soprano	Annenskaya
Stepan Bastryukov, son of a wealthy nobleman'	tenor	Rapport
Roman Dubrovin	baritone	Demidov
Olena, his wife	mezzo-soprano	Ivanova
Rezvïy, Bastryukov's servant	bass	Bozhanovsky
Jester	tenor	Lavrov
Nedviga, a nurse	mezzo-soprano	Rozanova
New voyevoda	bass	Korin
Chorus, silent roles: Noblemen, merchants, servants, maidens, people

== Instrumentation ==
- Strings: Violins I, Violins II, Violas, Cellos, and Double Basses
- Woodwinds: Piccolo, 2 Flutes, 2 Oboes, Cor Anglais, 2 Clarinets (B-flat & A), 2 Bassoons
- Brass: 4 Horns (all in F), 2 Trumpets (B-flat), 3 Trombones, Tuba
- Percussion: Timpani, Triangle, Cymbals, Bass Drum
- Other: Harp

Source: Voyevoda (opera) Tchaikovsky Research

== Synopsis ==
Time: The middle of the 17th century Place: A large city on the Volga River

Overture

=== Act 1 ===
No.1 Chorus of Maidens & Scena
No.2 Mariya's Ballad & Duet
No.3 Scena
No.4 Bastryukov's Aria
No.5 Scena & Duet
No.6 Scena
No.7 Scena
No.8 Quartet & Scena
No.9 Finale

=== Act 2 ===
No.10 Introduction
No.11 Chorus of Servants
No.12 Bastryukov's Aria
No.13 Scena & Dubrovin's Aria
No.14 Entr'acte & Dances of the Chambermaids
No.15 Scena & Mariya's Song
No.16 Scena
No.17 Duet
No.18 Scena
No.19 Scena & Khorovod

=== Act 3 ===
No.20 Entr'acte
No.21 Scena & Dubrovin's Aria
No.22 Scena
No.23 Quartet
No.24 Scena
No.25 Duet
No.26 Scena & Quartet
No.27 Scena
No.28 Quintet
No.29 Scena & Chorus
No.30 Scena
No.31 Closing Scena

Source: Tchaikovsky Research

== Derived works ==
- The Entr'acte and Dances of the Chambermaids from Act 2 were based on the Characteristic Dances for orchestra (1865), and were also arranged for piano duet by Tchaikovsky.
- Under the pseudonym "Cramer", Tchaikovsky composed a Potpourri on themes from the opera The Voyevoda, for solo piano (1868).

== Similarly named works ==
- In 1886, Tchaikovsky wrote incidental music for the Domovoi scene from Alexander Ostrovsky's A Dream on the Volga. This is the same play that formed the basis of the opera, but the incidental music is otherwise unconnected to the opera.
- Tchaikovsky's symphonic ballad in A minor, entitled The Voyevoda, Op. 78 (1891), is based on Alexander Pushkin's translation of Adam Mickiewicz's poem and thus is not related to the like-named opera in either the music or the underlying story.
- Rimsky-Korsakov's opera Pan Voyevoda, set in Poland, likewise is not related to Ostrovsky's play.

== Recordings ==
- A complete recording of the opera has been issued on the Aquarius CD label, with Vladimir Kozhukhar conducting soloists with the Academic Grand Chorus of Central Television and All-Union Radio and the State Symphonic Orchestra of the USSR Ministry of culture.
- The lively, sometimes dramatic, overture has occasionally been performed and recorded. It is one of the few works of Tchaikovsky to be performed by Arturo Toscanini and the NBC Symphony Orchestra in a broadcast performance that was preserved on transcription discs. The overture, as well as the entr'acte and dances, was also included in Vox Records' complete recordings of Tchaikovsky's orchestral music, released on both LP and CD (with Dolby surround sound); János Fürst conducted the Bamberg Symphony.
