= Francesca da Rimini (Tchaikovsky) =

Symphonic poem

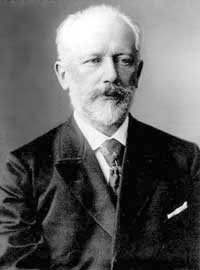
The composer Pyotr Ilyich Tchaikovsky

Francesca da Rimini: Symphonic Fantasy after Dante, Op. 32, is a symphonic poem by Pyotr Ilyich Tchaikovsky. It is a symphonic interpretation of the tragic tale of Francesca da Rimini, a beauty immortalized in Dante's Divine Comedy.

== Background ==
On 27 July 1876, Tchaikovsky wrote, "This morning, when I was in the train, I read the Fourth [sic] Canto of Hell and was seized with a burning desire to write a symphonic poem on Francesca". Later that summer, he visited Bayreuth to attend Der Ring des Nibelungen. He composed Francesca in Moscow in October and November. It is dedicated to his friend and former pupil Sergei Taneyev. It was first performed early in 1877 in Moscow in a concert by the Russian Musical Society, conducted by Nikolai Rubinstein.

== Analysis ==
In this fantasia, Tchaikovsky presents a symphonic interpretation of the tragic tale of Francesca da Rimini, a beauty who was immortalized in Dante's Divine Comedy. In the fifth canto of Inferno, Dante the narrator meets the shade of Francesca da Rimini, a noblewoman who fell in love with the brother of her cruel husband. After the husband discovered the lovers and killed them, the lovers were condemned to Hell for their adulterous passions. In their damnation, the lovers are trapped together in a violent storm, whirled through the air around the second circle of Hell, never to touch the ground again. They are tormented most of all by the ineradicable memory of the joys and pleasures of the embraces they shared in life.

Of fantasias in general, Tchaikovsky wrote:

"...in the fantasia (The Tempest and Francesca, for instance) the form is totally unrestricted."

The work was influenced by his exposure to Wagner. Tchaikovsky wrote "The comment that I wrote that under the influence of the Nibelungs is very true. I felt it myself when I was working on it," adding "Is it strange that I should be subject to the influence of a work of art which in general I find very antipathetic?"

Immediately before writing Francesca, Tchaikovsky heard and reviewed Liszt's Dante Symphony, which is inspired by the same story, praising many aspects but noting it had little invention. Critics have contrasted the relative inventiveness of Francesca.

Contemporary critic Herman Laroche called Francesca "extraordinarily brilliant", noting that the "blinding play of the orchestral colors, inexhaustibly rich and incessantly changing, holds the listener from beginning to end as if held sway by some hallucination."

Later in his career, when he toured Europe conducting his work, Tchaikovsky regularly included Francesca in the program, for example in Paris in 1881, Berlin in 1889, and Cambridge in his last year of life. The Cambridge performance was on the occasion of the presentation of honorary degrees to several composers. Among them was Saint-Saëns, who wrote:

"Bristling with difficulties, Tchaikovsky's Francesca da Rimini, which lacks neither pungent flavours nor fireworks, shrinks from no violence. In it the gentlest and most kindly of men has unleashed a fearful tempest, and has had no more pity for his performers and listeners than Satan for the damned. But such was the composer's talent and supreme skill that one takes pleasure in this damnation and torture."

The piece has a duration of around 25 minutes. Catherine Coppola has published an academic analysis of the work.

== Instrumentation ==
The music is scored for 3 flutes (third doubling piccolo), 2 oboes, English horn, 2 clarinets in A, 2 bassoons, 4 horns, 2 cornets in A, 2 trumpets in E, 3 trombones, tuba, timpani, bass drum, cymbals, tam tam, harp, and strings.

== Sections and synopsis ==
This symphonic poem has an introduction and three parts.

- In the introduction, the basses and the wind section of the orchestra open in dark tones suggesting the beginning of Dante's Inferno, where the author is astray from the right path into somber woods.
- As the music continues into the first section, the horror felt by Dante is portrayed in the music as he walks in deeper and deeper into the first circles of Hell.
- In the second section, the tempo picks up, the narrative takes the audience into the second circle, where Dante finds, amongst others, such as Tristan and Isolde, Paolo Malatesta and Francesca da Rimini (née da Polenta) trapped together in a violent storm, whirled through the air around, violently crushed against ragged stone walls for eternity.
- In the third section, the music subsides, depicting Dante's request to speak with the doomed lovers (depicted by a solo clarinet), who recount their story of how Francesca was unwittingly married by proxy to Gianciotto Malatesta, Paolo's older, cruel and unattractive brother; the music continues to depict how they were unable to resist their fleshly attraction for each other and succumbed to their passion while reading a passage of the story of Queen Guinevere and Sir Lancelot [another pair of equally doomed lovers], depicted by the wind section supported by the strings in the moments of highest passion. The music also depicts the moment of their murder at the hands of Gianciotto, depicted by fast playing bassi and cymbals, followed by sombre horns in a requiem like theme. After their tale is over, the final section starts, depicting the eternal punishment that continues once more, leaving Dante (and the audience) in a state of shock depicted by the ominous tutti of the orchestra.

== Notable recordings ==
- Paavo Järvi, Tonhalle Orchester Zurich
- Yevgeny Mravinsky, Leningrad Philharmonic (three recordings, 1948, 1972 and 1983)
- Leopold Stokowski, New York Stadium Symphony Orchestra (the summer name for the New York Philharmonic) and the London Symphony Orchestra
- Antal Doráti, Minneapolis Symphony Orchestra
- Sir John Barbirolli, recording with the New York Philharmonic and with the New Philharmonia Orchestra
- Mstislav Rostropovich, London Philharmonic Orchestra
- Daniel Barenboim, Chicago Symphony Orchestra
- Sir Antonio Pappano, Orchestra dell'Accademia Nazionale di Santa Cecilia
- Mariss Jansons, Oslo Philharmonic
- Yevgeny Svetlanov, State Academic Symphony Orchestra of the Russian Federation
- Bernard Haitink, Royal Concertgebouw Orchestra
- Yuri Temirkanov, Royal Philharmonic Orchestra
- Vladimir Fedoseyev, Tchaikovsky Symphony Orchestra
- Seiji Ozawa, Berlin Philharmonic
- Neeme Järvi, Detroit Symphony Orchestra
- Leonard Bernstein, two recordings with the New York Philharmonic, and one with the Israel Philharmonic Orchestra
- Leonard Slatkin, St. Louis Symphony
- Christoph Eschenbach, recordings with the Houston Symphony and the Philadelphia Orchestra
- Carlo Maria Giulini, Philharmonia Orchestra
- Igor Markevitch, recordings with the New Philharmonia Orchestra and the Orchestre Lamoureux, Paris.
- Charles Munch, recordings with the Boston Symphony Orchestra and with the Royal Philharmonic Orchestra
- Riccardo Muti, Philadelphia Orchestra
- Gennady Rozhdestvensky, recordings with the Leningrad Philharmonic, and the USSR Ministry of Culture Symphony Orchestra
- Valery Gergiev, London Philharmonic Orchestra
- Eugene Ormandy, Philadelphia Orchestra
