= Souvenir de Hapsal =

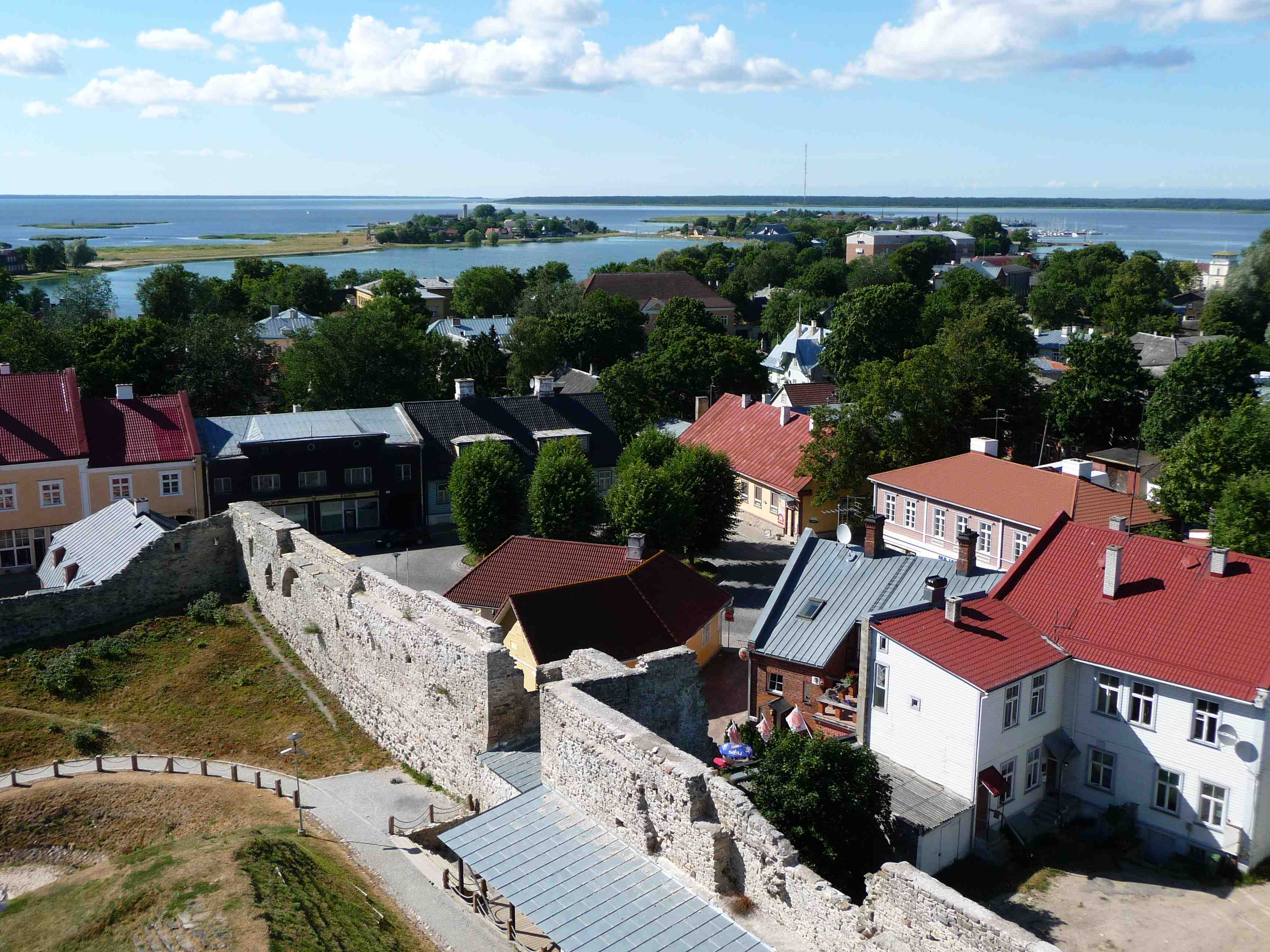
Hapsal

Souvenir de Hapsal, Op. 2, is a suite of three pieces for piano by Pyotr Ilyich Tchaikovsky. It was his first cycle of piano pieces and it was composed in 1867.

The Souvenir de Hapsal was written during Tchaikovsky's stay in Hapsal, then in the Russian Empire (it is now Haapsalu in Estonia). He stayed there with his brothers Modest and Anatoly Tchaikovsky as well as members of the Davydov family. He dedicated this work to Vera Davydova.

== The three pieces ==
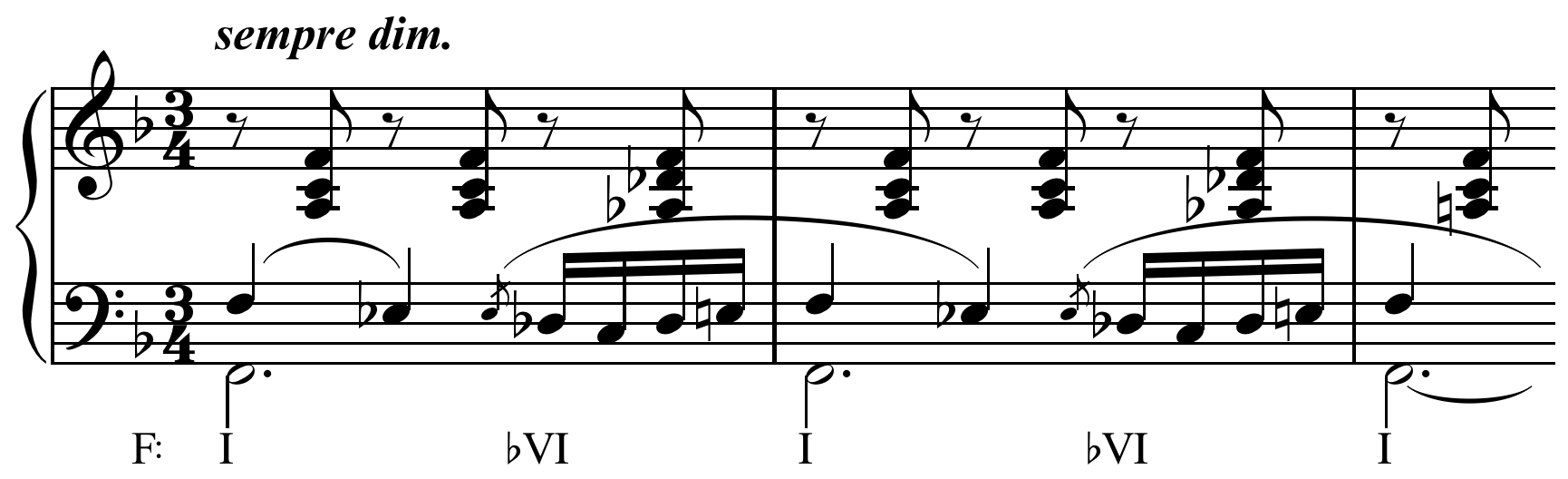
Chromatic mediant from Tchaikovsky's Chant sans paroles, Op. 2, No. 3, mm. 43-45.

Souvenir de Hapsal consists of three pieces for the piano:

1. Ruines d'un château, E minor
2. Scherzo, F major
3. Chant sans paroles, F major

The scherzo was first performed by Nikolai Rubinstein on 27 February 1868.

The conductor Max Erdmannsdörfer orchestrated Chant sans paroles, which pleased Tchaikovsky so much that he conducted it himself.
