= The Voyevoda (symphonic ballad) =

Composition by Pyotr Ilyich Tchaikovsky

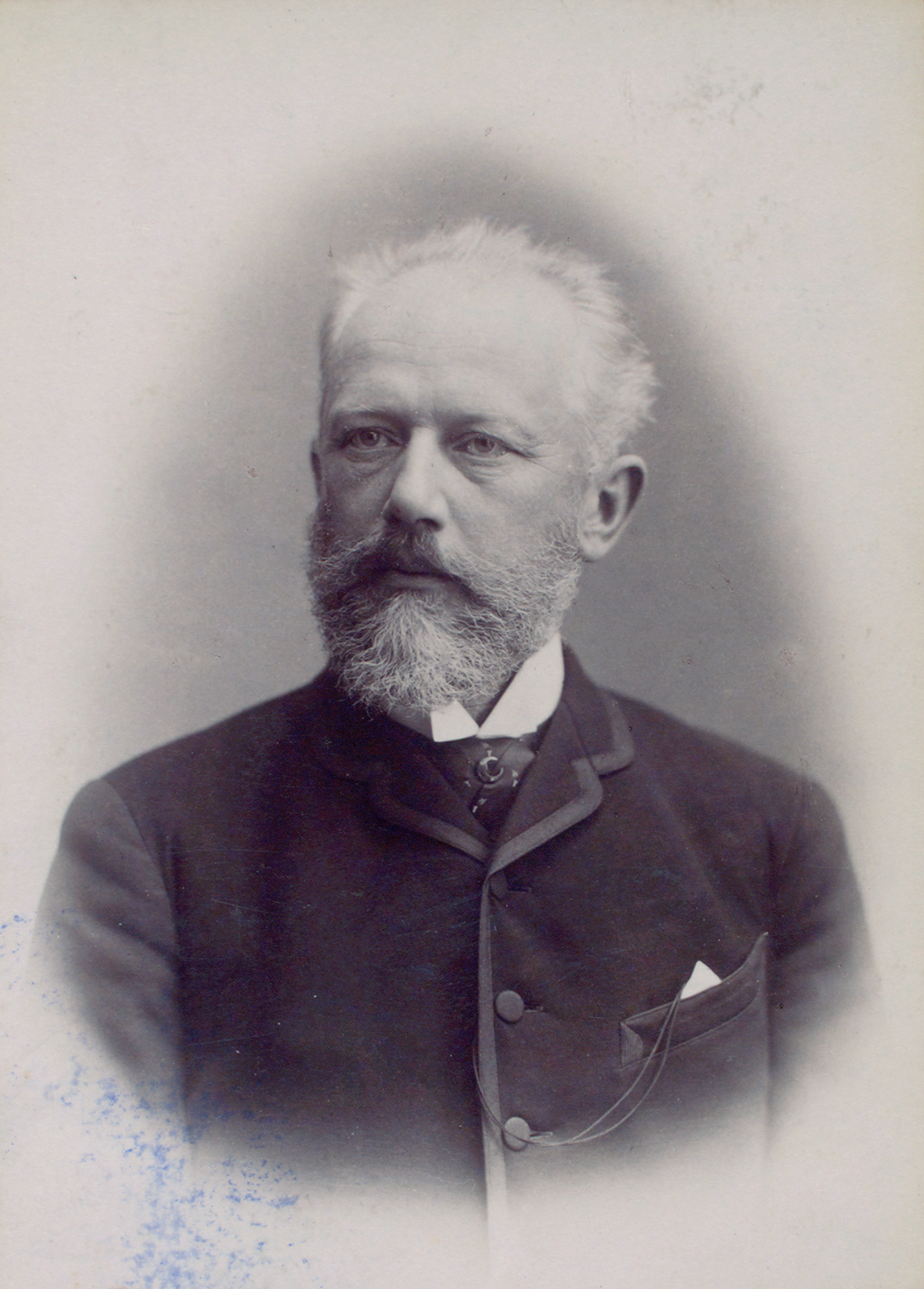
Pyotr Ilyich Tchaikovsky, c. 1888

The Voyevoda, Op. 78, is a "symphonic ballad" for orchestra, written by Pyotr Ilyich Tchaikovsky in 1891. It is based on Alexander Pushkin's translation of Adam Mickiewicz's poem of that name.

== Background ==
Tchaikovsky started work on the piece in September 1890, but did not finish it until close to the premiere over a year later. He was then actively engaged in finishing his last opera Iolanta. The premiere of the ballad, which he conducted, took place on 18 November 1891, in Moscow. He was very dissatisfied with the work; even before the first performance he had decided it was mediocre at best and threatened to destroy the score. After the performance, he declared "Such rubbish should never have been written". He carried out his threat the day after the first performance. However, the orchestral parts were retrieved by Alexander Siloti and the score was later reconstructed.

Later, Tchaikovsky wrote to his publisher P. Jurgenson, "I do not regret The Voyevoda - it's got what it deserved. I am not in the least sorry, for I am profoundly convinced that this work would compromise me ... If something of this sort happens again, I shall tear it to shreds, or else completely give up composing. Not for anything in the world do I want to go on dirtying paper like Anton Grigorievich [Rubinstein] when everything has long since packed up".

The work is notable as Tchaikovsky's first use of the celesta. He is most famous for using this instrument in the ballet The Nutcracker (particularly, but not exclusively, in "The Dance of the Sugarplum Fairy"), which was written after the ballad. However, he was not the first composer to use it: Ernest Chausson had used the celesta in a work for small orchestra in 1888.

Excerpts from the score were used in the 2005 ballet Anna Karenina, choreographed by Boris Eifman.

== Similarly named works ==
- In 1867–68, Tchaikovsky wrote an opera The Voyevoda, based on the play A Dream on the Volga, by Alexander Ostrovsky. Apart from the title, this opera has nothing in common with the symphonic ballad.
- In 1886, Tchaikovsky wrote incidental music for the Domovoi scene from A Dream on the Volga.

== Notable recordings ==
- Antal Doráti conducting the National Symphony Orchestra
- Yuri Krasnopolsky conducting the New Philharmonia Orchestra
- Andrew Litton conducting the Dallas Symphony Orchestra
- Vasily Petrenko conducting the Royal Liverpool Philharmonic
- Yevgeny Svetlanov conducting the State Academic Symphony Orchestra of the Russian Federation
- Vyacheslav Ovchinnikov conducting the USSR State Radio and Television Symphony Orchestra
- Mikhail Pletnev conducting the Russian National Orchestra
- Claudio Abbado conducting the Chicago Symphony Orchestra
