= Pezzo capriccioso =

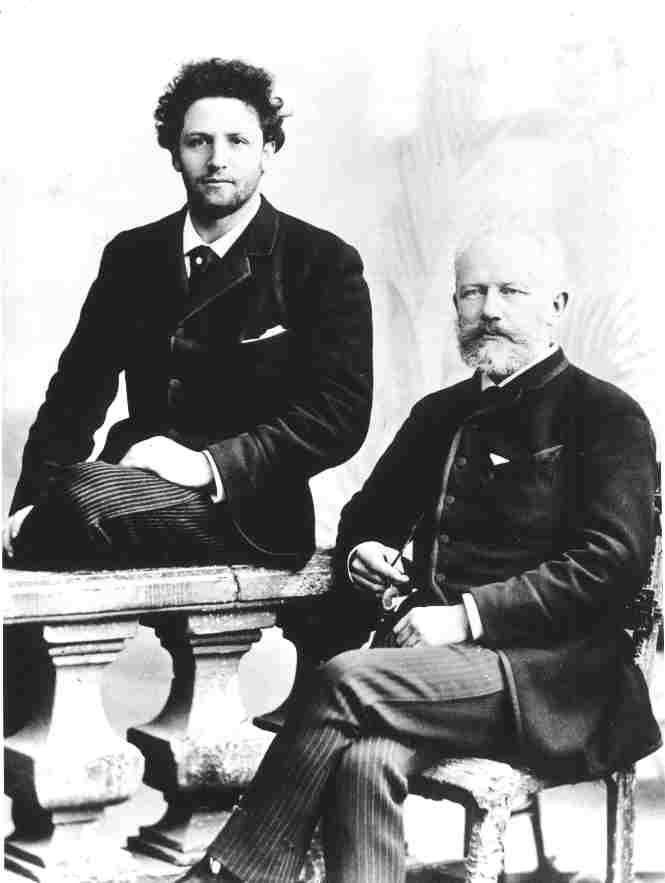
Tchaikovsky (right) with Anatoliy Brandukov, to whom he dedicated the Pezzo capriccioso

Pyotr Ilyich Tchaikovsky composed his Pezzo capriccioso, Op. 62, for cello and orchestra in a single week in August 1887. Belying its title, this work is written in the somber key of B minor, the same key as the Symphony No. 6 Pathétique. The Pezzo is not capricious in a lighthearted sense. The capriccioso aspect comes from Tchaikovsky's fanciful treatment of various aspects of the work's simple theme. Despite some rapid passages and a turn to the major key, Tchaikovsky preserves the basic pulse and sober mood throughout the piece.

The sobriety was a result of Tchaikovsky's sufferings with his friend Nikolay Kondratyev. Kondratyev was in the final throes of syphilis. After a brief remission, he had been taken to Aachen, Germany, where his family hoped the mineral waters there would prolong his life at least a few months. Instead, Kondratyev had taken a turn for the worse. Moreover, he proved a highly unpredictable, volatile and demanding patient, which unnerved the already death-shy Tchaikovsky (Kondratyev died in Aachen on October 3.). A visit to see friends in Paris—among them cellist Anatoliy Brandukov—proved only a brief respite.

All this suffering poured through the music Tchaikovsky was writing, as well. Tchaikovsky wrote Brandukov on August 25, "I have written a small cello piece, and would like you to look through it, and put the final touches to the cello part." Two days later he had begun to make the piano score of the piece, and on 31st he began orchestrating it.

The first performance of the Pezzo capriccioso, in its arrangement for piano accompaniment, took place on February 28, 1888 [O.S. February 16] at the home of M. P. Benardaky, during Tchaikovsky's visit to Paris. Brandukov was soloist, with the composer at the keyboard. The first performance of the orchestral version was given by Brandukov in Moscow at a special concert of the Russian Musical Society on November 25, 1889. Tchaikovsky conducted the orchestra.

P. Jurgenson published the Pezzo capriccioso in 1888—the orchestral parts in January, and the arrangement for cello with piano in March. Publication of the full score was delayed because Tchaikovsky had taken the manuscript abroad with him, and did not return it to Jurgenson until May 6, 1888. The full score was printed in July the same year.
