= Valse-Scherzo (Tchaikovsky) =

1877 work for violin and orchestra by Pyotr Ilyich Tchaikovsky

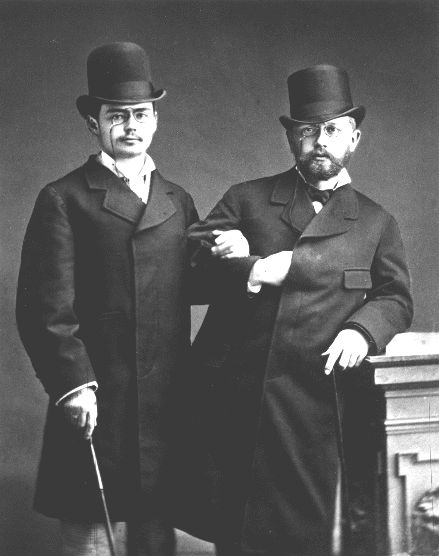
Iosif Kotek and Pyotr Ilyich Tchaikovsky

The Valse-Scherzo in C major, Op. 34, TH 58, is a work for violin and orchestra by Pyotr Ilyich Tchaikovsky, written in 1877.

It is not to be confused with two similarly named works by Tchaikovsky, both for solo piano: one written in 1870 as Op. 7, and one from 1889 without opus number.

== History ==
The origins of the Valse-Scherzo are somewhat mysterious. It seems to have been written in January–February 1877; this has been surmised from a letter of 3 February 1877 from Iosif Kotek to Tchaikovsky, which is the first documentary evidence of its existence. Kotek was a violinist and former composition student of Tchaikovsky at the Moscow Conservatory, graduating in 1876. Around this time they almost certainly became lovers.

The work was dedicated to Kotek on its publication in 1878. In the meantime, Kotek had worked with Tchaikovsky on the Violin Concerto in D while visiting him in Clarens, Switzerland in 1877. Indeed, it was Kotek's visit that provided the direct inspiration for the concerto, as he brought with him the score of the recently published Symphonie espagnole by Édouard Lalo, which so impressed Tchaikovsky that he put aside the composition he had been working on (the Piano Sonata in G major) and immediately started to write a violin concerto of his own. With Kotek's technical assistance and feedback, the concerto was completed inside a month. Some sources have stated that Tchaikovsky had wanted to dedicate the concerto to Kotek but decided against this because of the questions this would raise as to the nature of the relationship between them (it was dedicated firstly to Leopold Auer, and later to Adolph Brodsky). The previously written Valse-Scherzo was the work that would be dedicated to Kotek.

There are hints from Kotek's letters to Tchaikovsky that Kotek was given the honour of orchestrating the Valse-Scherzo, at least in part. But there is no mention of this in any of Tchaikovsky's correspondence.

Its first performance was by the Polish violinist Stanisław Barcewicz on 20 September 1878, at a Russian Symphony Concert at the Trocadéro in Paris, France, under the baton of Nikolai Rubinstein, in conjunction with the 1878 Paris World Exposition. Barcewicz was a fellow student of Iosif Kotek's under Tchaikovsky, and it was he who in 1892 gave the Polish premiere of the Violin Concerto, under the composer's baton.

The second performance of the Valse-Scherzo, and its first performance in Russia, was a little over a year later, on 1/13 December 1879, again by Barcewicz and again conducted by Rubinstein, at a Russian Symphony Society Concert in Moscow.

It was first published in 1878 by P. Jurgenson, in the composer's arrangement for violin and piano, and the orchestral parts were published the same year. The full score was not published until 1895, two years after Tchaikovsky's death.

The Valse-Scherzo has received many performances and recordings by violinists such as David Oistrakh, Leonid Kogan, Itzhak Perlman, Nathan Milstein, Midori, Gil Shaham, Boris Belkin, Ulf Hoelscher, Vadim Repin, Sarah Chang, Chloë Hanslip, James Ehnes, Leila Josefowicz and Julia Fischer.

Sergei Nakariakov has recorded a version for trumpet and piano.

== Music ==
The orchestration is two flutes, two oboes, two clarinets in B♭, two bassoons, two horns in F, and strings.

The Valse-Scherzo is written in A–B–A form plus a cadenza. It is marked Allegro. Tempo di Valse and takes about six minutes. While short, it makes great technical demands on the soloist.
