= Festival Overture on the Danish National Anthem =

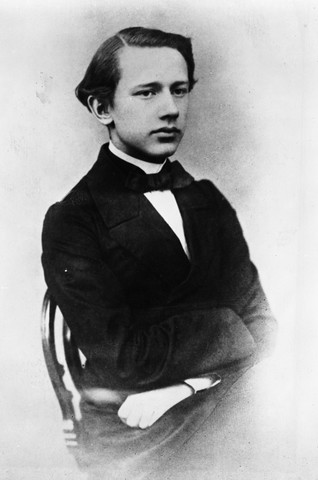
Pyotr Ilyich Tchaikovsky as a student at the St. Petersburg Conservatory in 1863

During his time at the Moscow Conservatoire around September 1866, the school's principal, Nikolay Rubinstein commissioned Pyotr Ilyich Tchaikovsky to compose a Festival Overture on the Danish National Anthem to be played for the visit of the Tsarevich (heir to the throne) to Moscow, accompanied by his new Danish bride, Princess Dagmar of Denmark. The Tsarevich would eventually be crowned Tsar Alexander III of Russia and remain a devoted follower of Tchaikovsky's music, awarding the composer both the Order of St. Vladimir (Fourth Class) in 1884 and a state pension in 1885.

Tchaikovsky often set about functional commissions with a strong air of professionalism, knowing that the piece may only even be played once, and this work was no exception. Indeed, Tchaikovsky himself wrote at the end of his life that this piece was 'very effective... and far better as music than 1812'.

Tchaikovsky thought that it would be a good idea to incorporate the Russian national anthem's melody into the work as well, by way of symbolising the union of two realms, but this innocent venture ultimately led to the piece's downfall and to the cancellation of the official performance.

A piece of surviving journalism states, 'Our talented young composer for some reason took it into his head to set forth our Russian national anthem in the minor key, which completely transforms the character of this well-known melody.'

However, Tchaikovsky received a gift of gold cuff links from the Tsarevich as an expression of royal gratitude for his efforts anyway.

== See also ==
Kong Christian stod ved højen mast - The Danish royal anthem Tchaikovsky based his work on.
