= Souvenir d'un lieu cher =

1878 musical work by Pyotr Ilyich Tchaikovsky

- Memory of a Dear Place
- by Pyotr Ilyich Tchaikovsky
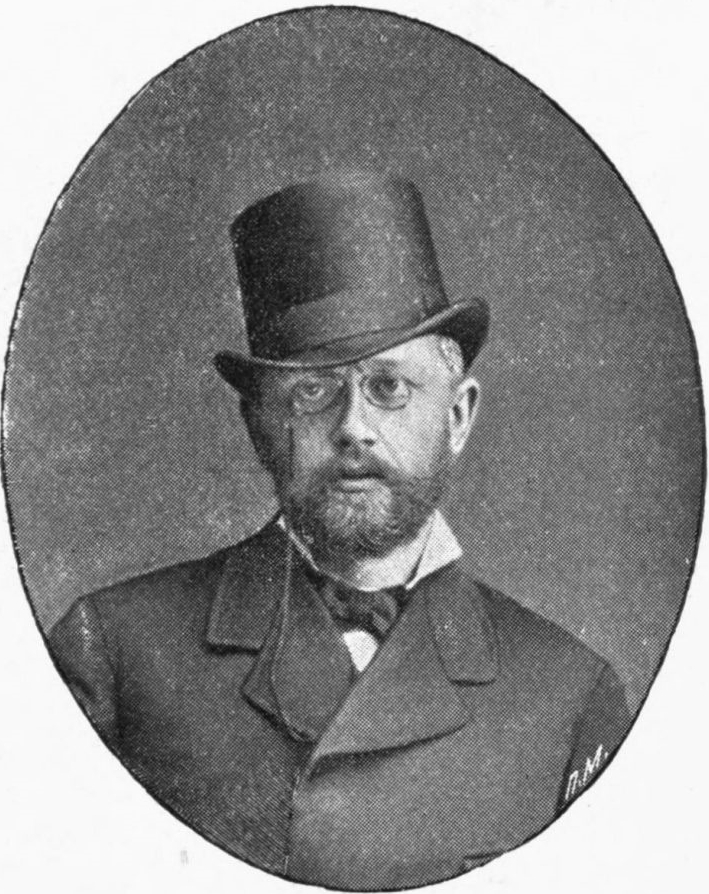
- Tchaikovsky in 1877
- Opus: 42
- Composed: 1878
- Movements: 3 (Méditation; Scherzo; Mélodie)
- Scoring: Violin; piano

Souvenir d'un lieu cher (Memory of a Dear Place or Memory of a Beloved Place, sometimes Souvenir of a Beloved Place; Russian: Воспоминание о дорогом месте), Op. 42, is a set of three pieces for violin and piano, written by Pyotr Ilyich Tchaikovsky in 1878.

The three pieces are:

1. Méditation (D minor)
2. Scherzo (C minor)
3. Mélodie (E♭ major; Tchaikovsky also described it as a "chant sans paroles").

A typical performance takes approximately 16 minutes.

== Composition ==
The Méditation was written between 23 and 25 March 1878, in Clarens, Switzerland, where Tchaikovsky wrote his Violin Concerto. It was originally intended as the slow movement of the concerto, but he realised it was too slight for a concerto, so he discarded it and wrote a Canzonetta instead. On 16 May, back in Russia, he started on a work in three parts for violin and piano (the only time he ever originally wrote for that combination of instruments, although the Valse-Scherzo also exists in a violin and piano arrangement). On 22 May he told his brother Modest that it was going well. On 25 May he left for a two-week vacation on the Ukrainian country estate Brailivo (sometimes seen in English as "Brailovo"), which belonged to his benefactress Nadezhda von Meck, where he finished the work by 31 May. For the first movement, he used the discarded Méditation, recasting it for violin and piano. The two additional movements, Scherzo and Mélodie, completed the Souvenir d'un lieu cher. While at Brailovo, he also completed the Six Romances, Op. 38, and sketched his entire setting of the Liturgy of St. John Chrysostom.

Tchaikovsky had the original manuscript sent as a token of gratitude to Nadezhda von Meck, but he always intended to publish the work, so he asked her to arrange for a copy to be made, which was done by Władysław Pachulski, a member of von Meck's household and later her son-in-law. This copy was sent to the publisher, P. Jurgenson. Tchaikovsky dedicated the work to "B*******", which is understood to refer to Brailovo itself. It was published in May 1879, as Op. 42.

In 1880, the Méditation was published separately, and has since become well known as an independent piece. The Scherzo and Mélodie were published separately in 1884. In 1896 Jurgenson published the complete work in an arrangement by Alexander Glazunov for violin and orchestra, and in this form it has perhaps become better known than in its original form for violin and piano. There are also arrangements for violin and strings by Nils Thore Røsth and Alexandru Lascae.
