= Moscow (Tchaikovsky) =

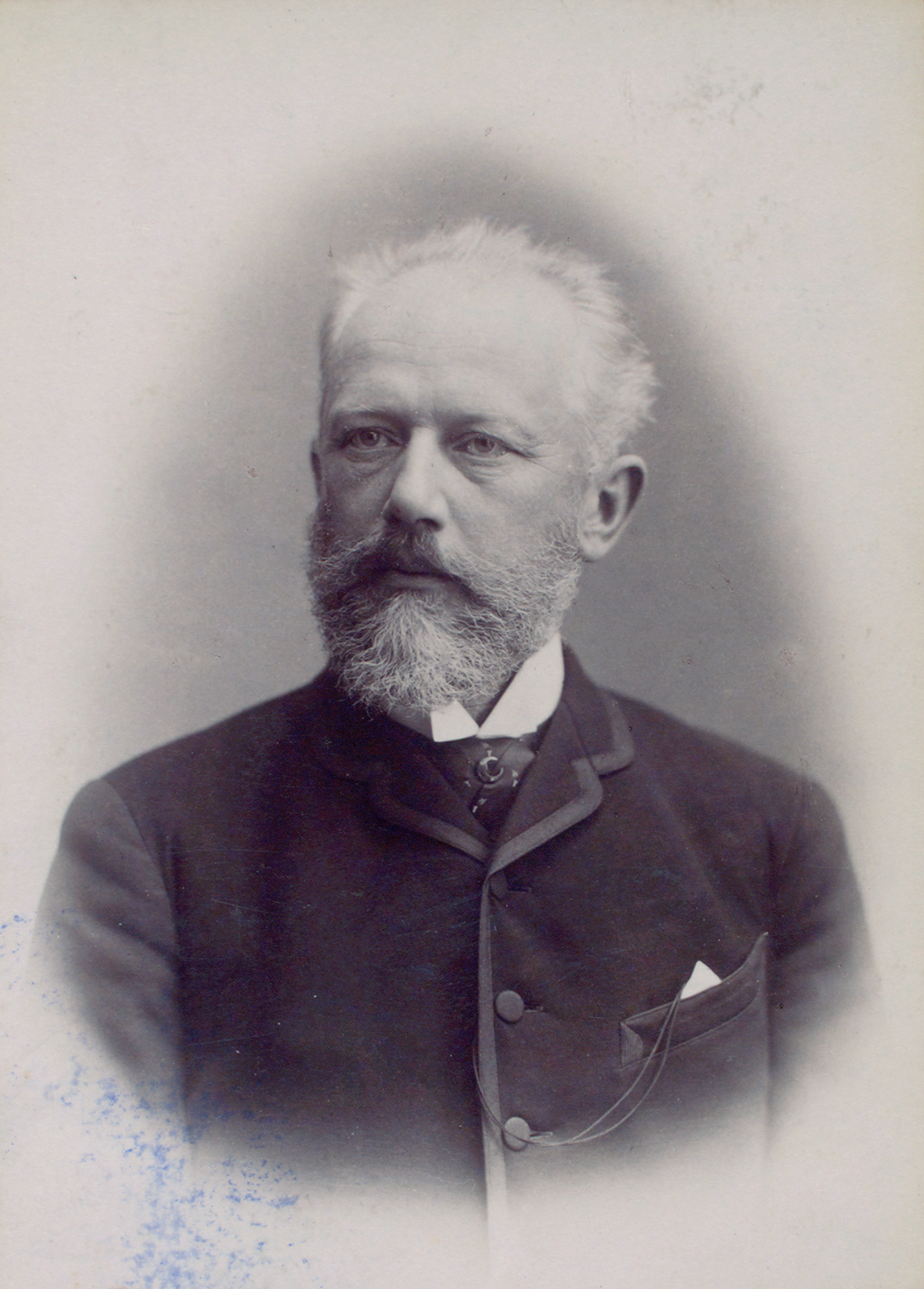
Pyotr Ilyich Tchaikovsky in 1888

Moscow (Russian: Москва, romanized: Moskva) is a cantata composed by Pyotr Ilyich Tchaikovsky in 1883 for the coronation of Alexander III of Russia, to a Russian libretto by Apollon Maykov. It is scored for mezzo-soprano, baritone, mixed chorus (SATB), 3 flutes, 2 oboes, 2 clarinets, 2 bassoons, 4 horns, 2 trumpets, 3 trombones, tuba, timpani, harp and strings.

== Structure ==
There are six movements:

1. Introduction and chorus. Andante religioso (A major)
2. Arioso. Moderato con moto (D major)
3. Chorus. Allegro (D major)
4. Monologue and chorus. Moderato – Largo (B minor)
5. Arioso. Andante molto sostenuto (E♭ minor)
6. Finale. Moderato con moto (D major)

== Sources ==
- Wiley, Roland John (2009). Tchaikovsky. Oxford University Press. ISBN 978-0195368925.
