= Piano Sonata in C-sharp minor (Tchaikovsky) =

2nd Piano Sonata

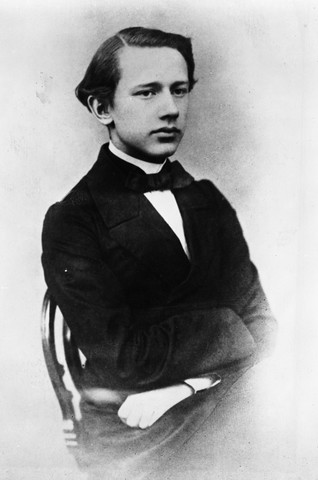
Tchaikovsky as a student at the St. Petersburg Conservatory in 1863

Russian composer Pyotr Ilyich Tchaikovsky wrote his Piano Sonata in C♯ minor in 1865, his last year as a student at the St Petersburg Conservatory. The four-movement work was not published during the composer's lifetime, but Tchaikovsky did transpose, adapt and orchestrate its third movement to create the scherzo of his Symphony No. 1 in G minor, Op. 13.

The sonata itself was eventually published in 1900 by P. Jurgenson but with the misleading posthumous opus number "80"; it is more properly catalogued in the 2002 Tchaikovsky Handbook as "TH 123."

The four movements are:

1. Allegro con fuoco (C♯ minor, 4/4)
2. Andante (A major, 3/4)
3. Allegro vivo (C♯ minor, 3/8)
4. Allegro vivo (C♯ minor, 2/2)

The sonata ends in the tonic major, in the enharmonic spelling of D♭ major.

Tchaikovsky went on to write a second piano sonata, in G major, in 1878, which was published as Op. 37.
