= Capriccio Italien =

Fantasy for orchestra by Pyotr Ilyich Tchaikovsky

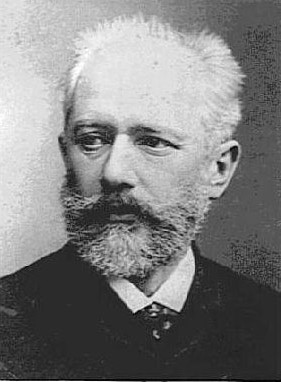
Pyotr Ilyich Tchaikovsky c. 1875

Capriccio italien, Op. 45, is a 15-minute fantasy for orchestra by Pyotr Ilyich Tchaikovsky. Composed between January and May 1880, it premiered on 18 December that year (New System) in Moscow with Nikolay Rubinstein conducting the Orchestra of the Imperial Russian Musical Society. The dedicatee was cellist Karl Davydov. The work's initial name was Italian Fantasia, after Mikhail Glinka's Spanish pieces.

== Background ==
Capriccio italien was inspired by a trip Tchaikovsky took to Rome with his brother Modest as respite from the composer's disastrous marriage with Antonina Miliukova. It was there that the observant Tchaikovsky called Raphael a "Mozart of painting." And from Rome he wrote to his friend Nadezhda von Meck:

I have already completed the sketches for an Italian fantasia on folk tunes for which I believe a good fortune may be predicted. It will be effective, thanks to the delightful tunes which I have succeeded in assembling partly from anthologies, partly from my own ears in the streets.

Conductor JoAnn Falletta says:

We are hearing foreigners' views of Italy. […] Capriccio Italien has great power even though it's practically a pops piece. Tchaikovsky knows what the instruments can do in a virtuoso way. He brings them to their limit in the most thrilling fashion. He has a gift for mixing families of instruments just right, like cantabile strings along with mighty brass. I hear the ballet element in everything Tchaikovsky writes, in his sense of rhythm. You can practically dance to [this score]!

== Structure ==
Capriccio italien is scored for 3 flutes (3rd doubling on piccolo), 2 oboes, English horn, 2 clarinets in A, 2 bassoons, 4 horns in F, 2 cornets in A, 2 trumpets in E, 3 trombones (2 tenor, 1 bass), tuba, percussion (3 timpani, triangle, tambourine, cymbals, bass drum, and glockenspiel), harp, and strings.

After a brief bugle call, inspired by a Il Silenzio d’Ordinanza, a bugle call Tchaikovsky heard daily in his rooms at the Hotel Costanzi, next door to the barracks of the Royal Italian Cuirasseurs, a stoic, heroic, unsmiling melody is played by the strings. Eventually, this gives way to music sounding as if it could be played by an Italian street band, beginning in the winds and ending with the whole orchestra. Next, a lively march ensues, followed by a lively tarantella. One of the main themes is another Italian folk song, precisely from Tuscany, Bella ragazza dalle trecce bionde.

The brothers were there during Carnival, and, despite calling it "a folly," the composer was able to soak up Italian street music and folk songs which he then incorporated into his Capriccio. This enables some "bright primary colors and uncomplicated tunefulness."

== Performance history ==
List of notable performances of Tchaikovsky's Italian Capriccio, during his life.

- Moscow, Russian Empire: 6 December 1880, conducted by Nikolai Rubinstein (premiere)
- Saint Petersburg, Russian Empire: 7 January 1881, conducted by Eduard Nápravník (Saint Petersburg premiere)
- Saint Petersburg, Russian Empire: 15 January 1881, conducted by Eduard Nápravník
- Riga, Russian Empire: 23 April 1882, conducted by Julius Ruthardt
- London, Great Britain: 5 December 1885, conducted by August Manns
- New York, United States: 5 November 1886, conducted by Walter Damrosch
- Hamburg, German Empire: 20 January 1888, conducted by Tchaikovsky himself
- Warsaw, Russian Empire: 14 January 1892, conducted by Tchaikovsky himself

== Sources ==
- Brown, David. Tchaikovsky: The Years of Wandering, 1878–85. London: Gollancz, 1986
- Holoman, D. Kern (1992). Evenings with the Orchestra: A Norton Companion for Concert Goers. New York: W. W. Norton & Company.
