= Herman Laroche =

Russian composer

Herman Augustovich Laroche (Russian: Герман Августович Ларош, romanized: German Avgustovich Larosh; also German Avgustovič Laroš; 25 May 1845 in Saint Petersburg – 18 October 1904) was a Russian classical music critic and composer who was renowned throughout Moscow.

== Life ==
Herman Laroche was born in St. Petersburg in 1845 in the family of a French teacher. Laroche studied piano with Alexandre Dubuque at the Saint Petersburg Conservatory. After graduating from the Conservatory in 1866, he worked as a professor of music history and theory at the Moscow Conservatory (1867–1870, 1883–1886) and the Saint Petersburg Conservatory (1872–1875 and 1879).

Around 1875, Laroche left the St. Petersburg Conservatory; later he again taught at the St. Petersburg and Moscow conservatories. He gave public lectures on the history of music in St. Petersburg with great success; wrote in the "Musical List", "Yearbook of the Imperial Theaters", "News", etc.

From 1898 to 1901, Herman's family lived in house number 9 on Pushkinskaya Street.

== Career ==
In 1867, his extensive article appeared in the Russkiy Vestnik: "Glinka and his significance in music", published as a separate book in Moscow in 1868. Having moved to St. Petersburg in 1871, where he received a position as a professor of theory, and then of the history of music at the St. Petersburg Conservatory, Laroche became a regular contributor to the Golos newspaper, placing musical and literary feuilletons in it .

Under the editorship of Laroche, a Russian translation by M. I. Tchaikovsky of A. D. Ulybyshev ’s New Biography of Mozart (written in French) was published. Of the musical works of Laroche, the overture to the opera Karmozina and the symphonic allegro stand out. Both works were performed in the symphony collections of the Imperial Russian Musical Society.
