= Piano Sonata in G major (Tchaikovsky) =

Classical music composition

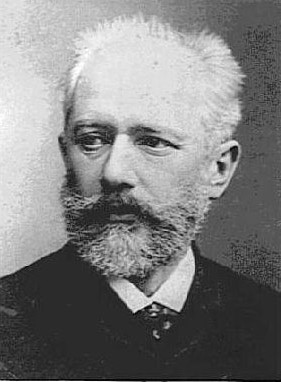
Pyotr Ilyich Tchaikovsky c. 1875

The Grand Piano Sonata in G major, Op. 37, was written by Russian composer Pyotr Ilyich Tchaikovsky in 1878. Though initially received with critical acclaim, the sonata has struggled to maintain a solid position in the modern repertoire. Nevertheless, the sonata has been recorded numerous times and is recognized as one of the composer's masterworks. It is dedicated to Karl Klindworth.

== History ==
The sonata was composed at Clarens and Kamenka between March and April 1878, around the same time as the famous Violin Concerto in D. In a letter to his younger brother Anatolii, Tchaikovsky complains about the difficulties he faced in writing his sonata:

I'm working on a sonata for piano... [and its composition] does not come easily. ...I worked unsuccessfully, with little progress... I'm again having to force myself to work, without much enthusiasm. I can't understand why it should be the case that, in spite of so many favourable circumstances, I’m not in the mood for work... I'm having to squeeze out of myself weak and feeble ideas, and ruminate over each bar. But I keep at it, and hope that inspiration will suddenly strike.

When Tchaikovsky's violinist friend Iosif Kotek arrived at Clarens, the composer's efforts quickly became focused on his Violin Concerto, and work on the sonata was discontinued. He resumed work on the sonata in mid-April and completed it before the month's end. It was premiered in a concert of the Russian Musical Society by pianist Nikolai Rubinstein, much to the composer's delight:

The Sonata was performed... with such unattainable perfection, that I could not have stayed to listen to anything more, so I left the hall completely enraptured.

The work was later performed by Rubinstein again, and was met with great critical acclaim. It was first published by P. Jurgenson in 1879.

== Movements ==
The work is in an expanded four-movement form and is distinctly symphonic in character:

1. Moderato e risoluto (G major)
2. Andante non troppo quasi Moderato (E minor)
3. Scherzo. Allegro giocoso (G major)
4. Finale. Allegro vivace (G major)

Structurally, the four movements are connected by the 'Grand Motif' introduced in the first movement, though it is expressed in a variety of contexts.

The first movement is written in common sonata-allegro form, and an array of techniques are used to mimic orchestral colors. The themes presented are undoubtedly Russian, but the composer's strict observance of Western musical tradition is still prevalent.

The second movement is a melancholy Andante which lends itself to Tchaikovsky's natural gift for lyricism. It is considerably longer than the two movements that follow it.

The third movement is a brief, fast-paced Scherzo, and foreshadows some of the techniques later used by Sergei Rachmaninoff and Alexander Scriabin, mainly in its melodic direction.

The fourth and final movement is a galloping Allegro that is very much characteristic of Tchaikovsky's musical style. After sections of difficult passage-work, the sonata closes with an exuberant coda.

The average playing time is about 31 minutes.

== Notable recordings ==
- Barry Douglas, released by RCA Victor
- Leslie Howard, released by Hyperion
- Viktoria Postnikova, released by Erato Records
- Sviatoslav Richter, released by Melodiya
