= Orchestral Suite No. 1 (Tchaikovsky) =

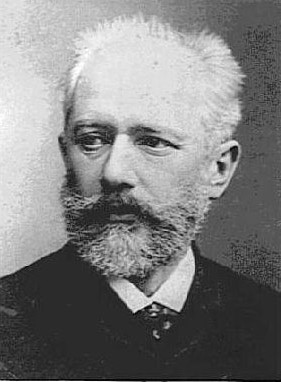
Pyotr Ilyich Tchaikovsky c. 1875

Orchestral Suite No. 1 in D minor is an orchestral suite, Op. 43, written by Pyotr Ilyich Tchaikovsky in 1878 and 1879. It was premiered on December 20, 1879 at a Russian Musical Society concert in Moscow, conducted by Nikolai Rubinstein. The piece is dedicated to Tchaikovsky's patroness, Nadezhda von Meck.

== Structure ==
Some critics have stated that, since Tchaikovsky used specific pre-classical types for the outer movements (Introduction and Fugue and Gavotte), his model for this work was the Baroque suite and not, as he had written to von Meck, the orchestral suites of Franz Lachner.

The suite is written in six movements.

1. Introduzione e fuga: Andante sostenuto – Moderato e con anima
2. Divertimento: Allegro moderato
3. Intermezzo: Andantino semplice
4. Marche miniature: Moderato con moto
5. Scherzo: Allegro con moto
6. Gavotte: Allegro

=== I. Introduzione e fuga: Andante sostenuto – Moderato e con anima ===
A very spacious and portentous introduction (the Baroque equivalent of a prelude) leads into what could be called an "academic" fugue since its climax steps away from Baroque practice, very loudly, into the 19th century. The movement's end, however, is quiet.

=== II. Divertimento: Allegro moderato ===
This movement could have just as easily been titled Valse. Tchaikovsky gives the clarinet the task of "discovering" the opening tune. There is also a section of the three flutes' chattering that will return for the Mirlitons' Dance in The Nutcracker.

=== III. Intermezzo: Andantino semplice ===
This movement is more restrained in tone. Its first subject is actually a "glosting" of the fugue subject from the opening movement. It alternates with a broad, sustained melody in a five-section A-B-A-B-A structure.

=== IV. Marche miniature: Moderato con moto ===
Scored for upper woodwind, with very discreet contributions from the violins, triangle and bells, this music's confectionery lightness would have allowed it to fit easily into The Nutcracker.

=== V. Scherzo: Allegro con moto ===
This was the first movement to be composed and was the reason for the suite's creation.

=== VI. Gavotte: Allegro ===
Tchaikovsky may have chosen to model this movement after a stately Baroque dance, but the music had less to do with J.S. Bach's style than it does, with its discreet piquancy, as a precursor to the corresponding movement in Sergei Prokofiev's Classical Symphony.

== Instrumentation ==
The suite is scored for an orchestra with the following instruments.

Woodwinds

1 piccolo
3 flutes
2 oboes
2 clarinets (B♭ and A)
2 bassoons

Brass

4 horns in F
2 trumpets (D and F)

Percussion

timpani
triangle
glockenspiel

Strings

violins I
violins II
violas
cellos
double basses

== Overview ==
=== New music, old forms ===
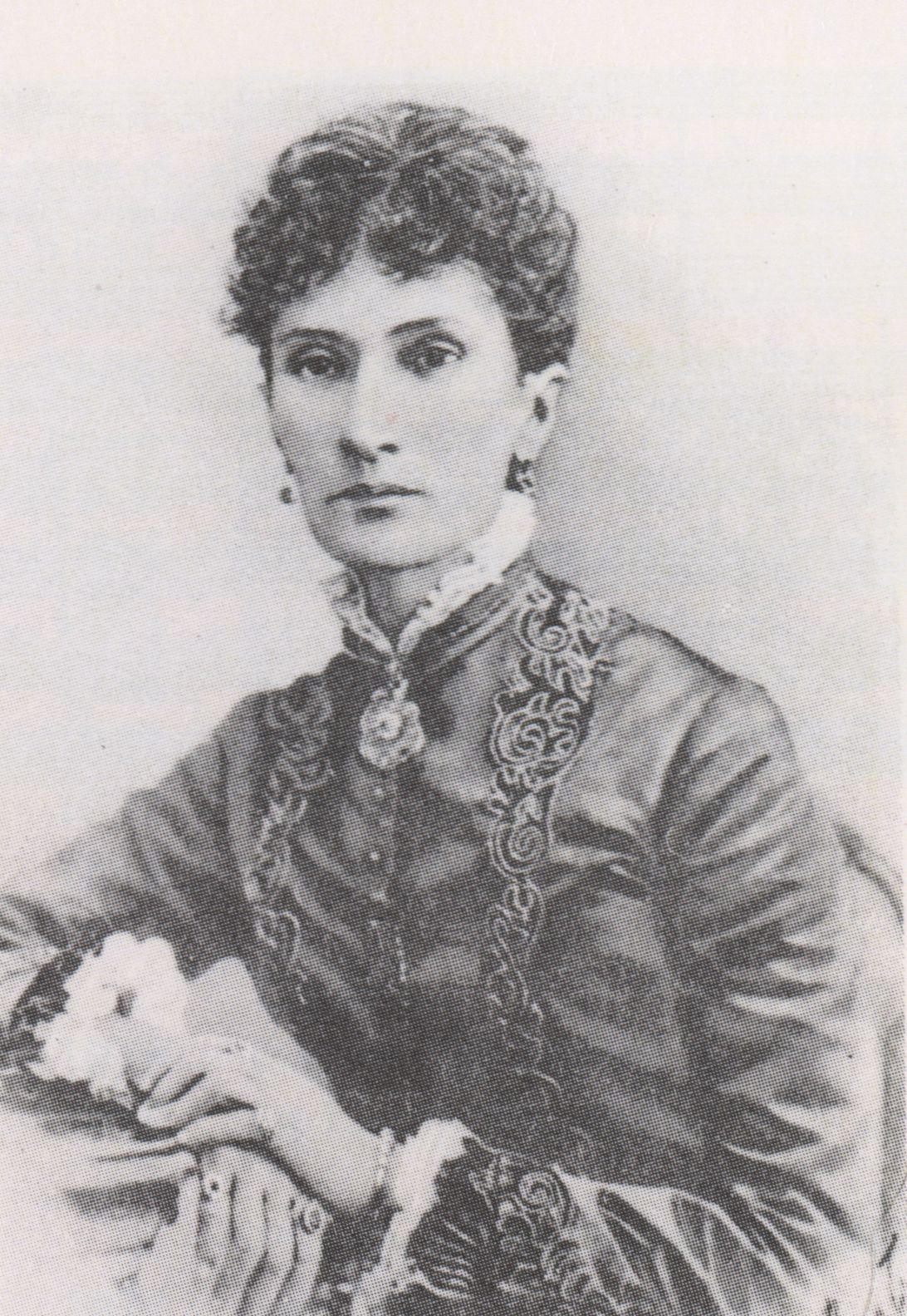
The dedicatee of the suite, Nadezhda von Meck

By the summer of 1878, Tchaikovsky, exhausted from working on the Fourth Symphony the previous year, decided he needed a sabbatical from symphonic music. However, in foregoing the composition of emotionally heavy music, he did not wish to negate his personality as much as he had in writing the Variations on a Rococo Theme. Instead, he decided to achieve the same classical polish and poise he had displayed in the Rococo Variations within his own compositional idiom. While the suite could be simply a selection of excerpts from a larger composition, as Tchaikovsky would later do with his Nutcracker Suite, it had historically been an independent form in itself. This was most notably the case with the Baroque suites that Johann Sebastian Bach composed for orchestra, keyboard and other instruments. These suites were made up mainly of dances of the time, such as allemandes, courantes, Sarabandes and gigues.

Few of Tchaikovsky's compositions are as far removed from the idea of the composer as musical confessor as his orchestral suites would become, yet they would remain entirely true to the pre-Romantic ideal he wished to summon. They were an outgrowth of a trend beginning in Germany following the rediscovering of Bach's orchestral suites, and he valued the genre for formal freedom as well as its unrestricted musical fantasy. They would give the composer free rein to his penchant for short genre pieces and orchestration. Johannes Brahms would happily find a similar outlet in his serenades, providing him with a medium in which to compose pure orchestral music more relaxed than had previously been possible in the post-Beethoven symphony.

Tchaikovsky's First Suite would be rooted in the world of the ballet divertissement. To ensure that the piece did not come across as overtly light or frivolous in tone, the composer afforded himself some highmindedness with the opening introduction and fugue. While Tchaikovsky had previously written extended fugato sections, he had written only one full-blown fugue in his compositions since leaving the St. Petersburg Conservatory, in his Op. 21 piano pieces. In addition, Tchaikovsky had to ensure that while the piece presented a wide range of styles and moods, it would add up to a coherent, satisfying experience. This caused him some difficulty as the piece's length rose to become the same as the Fourth Symphony and delayed its completion by a year.

=== Composition ===
According to an August 1878 letter to von Meck, Tchaikovsky originally planned the suite to be in five movements:

1. Introduzione e fuga
2. Scherzo
3. Andante melanconico
4. Intermezzo: March of the Liliputians
5. Rondo: Dance of the Giants

The scherzo was the germ for the whole composition; it was after plunging headlong into writing it that "there arose in my head an array of orchestral pieces which would generate a Suite in the manner of Lachner.". (Franz Lachner was a well-known and prolific composer in his day (1803–1890), though he is not now considered a major composer. His work was influenced by Ludwig van Beethoven and his friend Franz Schubert.) Complications arose when, once in Florence, Italy and anxious to continue the suite, Tchaikovsky realized the manuscripts for the three movements he had already finished were in his luggage, which had not arrived. He composed the final two movements he had planned while awaiting the luggage. The manuscripts were not among the luggage and were never found. Tchaikovsky completed the suite in April 1879.

Complicating matters was that, in August 1879, after P. Jurgenson had already started engraving the printing plates for the suite, Tchaikovsky realized all the movements were in duple meter—in other words, two beats per measure. He quickly penned a Divertimento in triple meter, which he called a minuet but is actually a waltz, to break up this potential metric monotony. Tchaikovsky suggested replacing the March with the Divertimento. Jurgenson liked the March and suggested letting the suite expand to six movements. Six, to Tchaikovsky, was one movement too many. He suggested that Sergei Taneyev be asked his opinion of the March. If Taneyev thought it worthwhile, then Tchaikovsky wanted to drop the Andante and reorder the movements as Introduction and Fugue, Divertimento, Scherzo, March, Gavotte. The Andante's case was then pleaded to the composer. By the time Rubinstein conducted the premiere, the order of the six movements was the one finally established.

=== Reception ===
Keeping the March may have actually been a prudent move on Jurgenson's part—one which the publisher may have relished as he reported the First Suite's success at its premiere. Tchaikovsky had been in Rome and could not attend. Jurgenson wrote, "The first movement went off without fervent expressions of delight. The second evidently pleased. The Andante pleased very much, but the March drew applause which wouldn't stop until it was repeated. The Scherzo was very well received. The Gavotte found the audience by now fatigued and bursting to get away." The suite's St. Petersburg premiere followed on April 6, 1880. It was enthusiastically received and the March again was the most successful movement. The March, in fact, would frequently become played separately because of its popularity.

When Claude Debussy was employed as a tutor to Nadezhda von Meck's children, he and she would play 4-hand piano arrangements of the Symphony No. 4 and the Suite No. 1. She wrote to Tchaikovsky that "he is in raptures over your music", and about the Suite No. 1 specifically, "He was in utter ecstasy over the fugue, expressing himself thus: Among modern fugues I've never seen anything so beautiful. Massenet himself could never do anything like it".

== Selected recordings ==
- Antal Doráti conducting the New Philharmonia Orchestra
- Neeme Järvi conducting the Detroit Symphony Orchestra
- Dimitri Mitropoulos conducting the New York Philharmonic Orchestra (one movement cut)
- Stefan Sanderling conducting the RTÉ National Symphony Orchestra

== Bibliography ==
- Brown, David, Tchaikovsky: The Years of Wandering (New York: W.W. Norton & Company, 1986). ISBN 0-393-02311-7.
- Brown, David, Tchaikovsky: The Man and His Music (New York: Pegasus Books, 2007). ISBN 978-1-933648-30-9.
- Maes, Francis, tr. Arnold J. Pomerans and Erica Pomerans, A History of Russian Music: From Kamarinskaya to Babi Yar (Berkeley, Los Angeles and London: University of California Press, 2002). ISBN 0-520-21815-9.
- Poznansky, Alexander, Tchaikovsky: The Quest for the Inner Man (London, 1993, Lime Tree)
- Warrack, John, Tchaikovsky (New York: Charles Scribner's Sons, 1973). ISBN 0-684-13558-2.
- Yoffe, Elkhonon, Notes for Chandos 9587, Tchaikovsky: Suite No. 1; The Storm; Fatum; the Detroit Symphony Orchestra conducted by Neeme Järvi.
