= Selivanovo =

Selivanovo (Russian: Селиваново) is the name of several rural localities in Russia.

== Arkhangelsk Oblast ==
As of 2012, one rural locality in Arkhangelsk Oblast bears this name:

- Selivanovo, Arkhangelsk Oblast, a village in Pezhemsky Selsoviet of Velsky District

== Belgorod Oblast ==
As of 2012, one rural locality in Belgorod Oblast bears this name:

- Selivanovo, Belgorod Oblast, a selo in Valuysky District

== Kaluga Oblast ==
As of 2012, one rural locality in Kaluga Oblast bears this name:

- Selivanovo, Kaluga Oblast, a village in Sukhinichsky District

== Kostroma Oblast ==
As of 2012, one rural locality in Kostroma Oblast bears this name:

- Selivanovo, Kostroma Oblast, a village in Stepanovskoye Settlement of Galichsky District; 58°30′N 42°17′E

== Leningrad Oblast ==
As of 2012, two rural localities in Leningrad Oblast bear this name:

- Selivanovo, Boksitogorsky District, Leningrad Oblast, a village in Samoylovskoye Settlement Municipal Formation of Boksitogorsky District; 59°29′N 34°15′E
- Selivanovo, Volkhovsky District, Leningrad Oblast, a settlement in Selivanovskoye Settlement Municipal Formation of Volkhovsky District; 60°13′N 32°42′E

== Moscow Oblast ==
As of 2012, two rural localities in Moscow Oblast bear this name:

- Selivanovo, Dmitrovsky District, Moscow Oblast, a village in Sinkovskoye Rural Settlement of Dmitrovsky District
- Selivanovo, Sergiyevo-Posadsky District, Moscow Oblast, a village in Shemetovskoye Rural Settlement of Sergiyevo-Posadsky District

== Novgorod Oblast ==
As of 2012, one rural locality in Novgorod Oblast bears this name:

- Selivanovo, Novgorod Oblast, a village in Fedorkovskoye Settlement of Parfinsky District

== Novosibirsk Oblast ==
As of 2012, one rural locality in Novosibirsk Oblast bears this name:

- Selivanovo, Novosibirsk Oblast, a village in Kupinsky District

== Oryol Oblast ==
As of 2012, one rural locality in Oryol Oblast bears this name:

- Selivanovo, Oryol Oblast, a village in Krutovsky Selsoviet of Kolpnyansky District

== Pskov Oblast ==
As of 2012, seven rural localities in Pskov Oblast bear this name:

- Selivanovo (Bezhanitskaya Rural Settlement), Bezhanitsky District, Pskov Oblast, a village in Bezhanitsky District; municipally, a part of Bezhanitskaya Rural Settlement of that district
- Selivanovo (Dobryvichskaya Rural Settlement), Bezhanitsky District, Pskov Oblast, a village in Bezhanitsky District; municipally, a part of Dobryvichskaya Rural Settlement of that district
- Selivanovo (Porechenskoye Rural Settlement), Bezhanitsky District, Pskov Oblast, a village in Bezhanitsky District; municipally, a part of Porechenskoye Rural Settlement of that district
- Selivanovo (Vekhnyanskaya Rural Settlement), Novorzhevsky District, Pskov Oblast, a village in Novorzhevsky District; municipally, a part of Vekhnyanskaya Rural Settlement of that district
- Selivanovo (Veskinskaya Rural Settlement), Novorzhevsky District, Pskov Oblast, a village in Novorzhevsky District; municipally, a part of Veskinskaya Rural Settlement of that district
- Selivanovo, Pushkinogorsky District, Pskov Oblast, a village in Pushkinogorsky District
- Selivanovo, Sebezhsky District, Pskov Oblast, a village in Sebezhsky District

== Ryazan Oblast ==
As of 2012, one rural locality in Ryazan Oblast bears this name:

- Selivanovo, Ryazan Oblast, a village in Dmitriyevsky Rural Okrug of Kasimovsky District

== Sakha Republic ==
As of 2012, one rural locality in the Sakha Republic bears this name:

- Selivanovo, Sakha Republic, a selo under the administrative jurisdiction of the Town of Olyokminsk in Olyokminsky District

== Smolensk Oblast ==
As of 2012, two rural localities in Smolensk Oblast bear this name:

- Selivanovo, Kholm-Zhirkovsky District, Smolensk Oblast, a village in Nakhimovskoye Rural Settlement of Kholm-Zhirkovsky District
- Selivanovo, Vyazemsky District, Smolensk Oblast, a village in Yushkovskoye Rural Settlement of Vyazemsky District

== Tula Oblast ==
As of 2012, one rural locality in Tula Oblast bears this name:

- Selivanovo, Tula Oblast, a selo in Selivanovskaya Rural Administration of Shchyokinsky District

== Tver Oblast ==
As of 2012, two rural localities in Tver Oblast bear this name:

- Selivanovo, Staritsky District, Tver Oblast, a village in Stepurinskoye Rural Settlement of Staritsky District
- Selivanovo, Vesyegonsky District, Tver Oblast, a village in Proninskoye Rural Settlement of Vesyegonsky District

== Vologda Oblast ==
As of 2012, four rural localities in Vologda Oblast bear this name:

- Selivanovo, Cherepovetsky District, Vologda Oblast, a village in Yargomzhsky Selsoviet of Cherepovetsky District
- Selivanovo, Kichmengsko-Gorodetsky District, Vologda Oblast, a village in Trofimovsky Selsoviet of Kichmengsko-Gorodetsky District
- Selivanovo, Nikolsky District, Vologda Oblast, a village in Krasnopolyansky Selsoviet of Nikolsky District
- Selivanovo, Velikoustyugsky District, Vologda Oblast, a village in Ust-Alexeyevsky Selsoviet of Velikoustyugsky District

== Yaroslavl Oblast ==
As of 2012, two rural localities in Yaroslavl Oblast bear this name:

- Selivanovo, Rybinsky District, Yaroslavl Oblast, a village in Glebovsky Rural Okrug of Rybinsky District
- Selivanovo, Uglichsky District, Yaroslavl Oblast, a village in Slobodskoy Rural Okrug of Uglichsky District
