= List of railway lines in Russia =

This is a list of railway lines in Russia.

== Main lines and their divisions ==
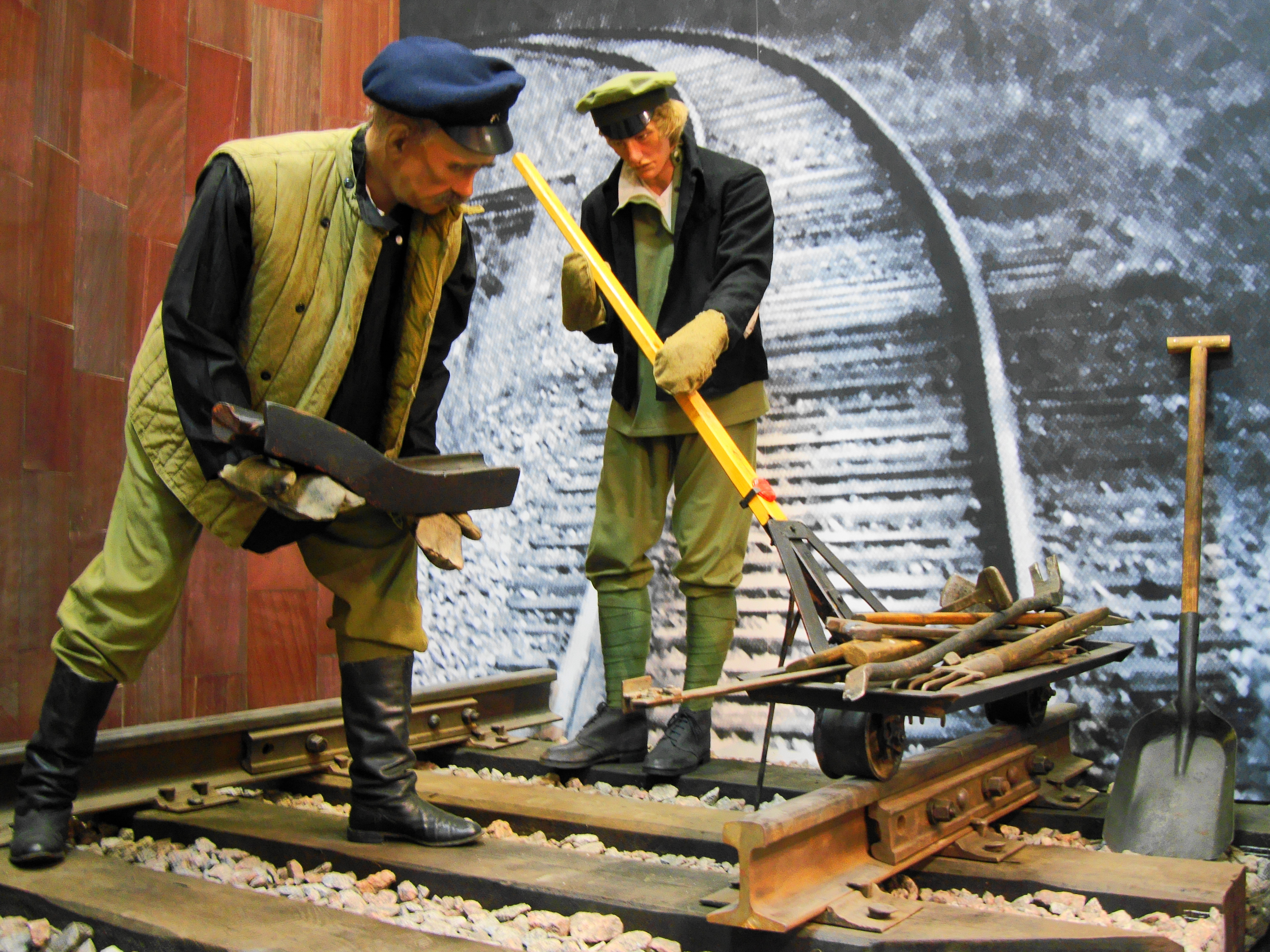
A life size diorama of Russian track workers repairing railway tracks at the Museum of the Moscow Railway

Russian Railways is by far the largest railway company. It owns many of the other railways.

- East Siberian Railway
  - Irkutsk Railway Division
  - Severobaykalsk Railway Division
  - Tayshet Railway Division
  - Ulan-Ude Railway Division
- Far Eastern Railway
  - Khabarovsk Railway Division
  - Komsomolsk Railway Division
  - Sakhalin Railway Division
  - Tynda Railway Division
  - Vladivostok Railway Division
- Gorky Railway
  - Gorky Railway Division
  - Izhevsk Railway Division
  - Kazan Railway Division
  - Kirov Railway Division
  - Murom Railway Division
- Kaliningrad Railway
- Krasnoyarsk Railway
  - Abakan Railway Division
  - Krasnoyarsk Railway Division
- Kuybyshev Railway
  - Bashkir Railway Division
  - Penza Railway Division
  - Samara Railway Division
  - Ulyanovsk Railway Division
- Moscow Railway
  - Bryansk Railway Division
  - Moscow-Kursk Railway Division
  - Moscow-Ryazan Railway Division
  - Moscow-Smolensk Railway Division
  - Oryol-Kursk Railway Division
  - Smolensk Railway Division
  - Tula Railway Division
- North Caucasus Railway
  - Grozny Railway Division
  - Krasnodar Railway Division
  - Makhachkala Railway Division
  - Mineralnye Vody Railway Division
  - Rostov Railway Division
- Northern Railway
  - Arkhangelsk Railway Division
  - Solvychegodsk Railway Division
  - Sosnogorsk Railway Division
  - Vologda Railway Division
  - Yaroslavl Railway Division
- Oktyabrskaya Railway
  - Moscow Railway Division
  - Murmansk Railway Division
  - Petrozavodsk Railway Division
  - Saint Petersburg Railway Division
  - Saint Petersburg-Vitebsk Railway Division
  - Volkhovstroy Railway Division
- South-Eastern Railway
  - Belgorod Railway Division
  - Liski Railway Division
  - Michurinsk Railway Division
  - Rtishchevo Railway Division
  - Yelets Railway Division
- South Urals Railway
  - Chelyabinsk Railway Division
  - Kartaly Railway Division
  - Kurgan Railway Division
  - Orenburg Railway Division
  - Petropavlovsk Railway Division
- Sverdlovsk Railway
  - Nizhny Tagil Railway Division
  - Perm Railway Division
  - Surgut Railway Division
  - Sverdlovsk Railway Division
  - Tyumen Railway Division
- Trans-Baikal Railway
  - Chita Railway Division
  - Mogocha Railway Division
  - Svobodny Railway Division
- Volga Railway
  - Astrakhan Railway Division
  - Saratov Railway Division
  - Volgograd Railway Division
- West Siberian Railway
  - Altay Railway Division
  - Kuzbass Railway Division
  - Novosibirsk Railway Division
  - Omsk Railway Division

== Fragments of main lines and historical lines ==
- Alma-Ata Railway (a section runs in Altai Krai, Russia)
- Amur Railway
- Baikal Amur Mainline
- Baltic Railway (a section runs in Kaliningrad Oblast, Russia)
- Connecting Line
- Kemerovo Railway
- Krugobaikalskaya Railway
- Mid-Siberian Railway
- Moscow-Brest Railway
- Moscow-Kazan Railway
- Moscow-Kiev-Voronezh Railway
- Moscow-Kursk Railway
- Moscow-Nizhny Novgorod Railway
- Moscow Ring Railway
- Moscow-Saint Petersburg Railway
- Moscow-Vindava-Rybinsk Railway
- Murmansk-Nikel Railway
- Murom Railway
- Nikolayevskaya Railway
- Northern Donetsk Railway (a section runs in Kursk Oblast, Russia)
- North Western Railways
- Northern Latitudinal Railway
- Perm Railway
- Polesia Railways (a section runs in Bryansk Oblast, Russia)
- Primorskaya railway (joined Oktyabrskaya Railway in 1925)
  - Ozerki line
  - Primorskaya line
  - Tovarnaya line
- Riga-Oryol Railway
- Ryazan-Urals Railway
- Saint Peterburg-Warsaw Railway
- Saint Petersburg-Hiitola railroad
- Salekhard-Igarka Railway
- Siberian Railway
- Syzran-Vyazma Railway
- Tashkent Railway (a sections runs in Orenburg and Samara Oblasts, Russia)
- Trans-Siberian Railway
- Tsarskoye Selo Railway
- Turkestan-Siberia Railway
- Ussuri Railway
- Vladikavkaz Railway
- Vyborg-Joensuu railroad
- West Kazakhstan Railway (a section runs in Orenburg Oblast, Russia)

== See also ==
- Children's railway an extracurricular educational institution, where teenagers learn railway professions.
- The Museum of the Moscow Railway
