= Tchaikovsky (film) =

Tchaikovsky (Чайковский)
- Original Russian film poster
- Directed by: Igor Talankin
- Written by: Budimir Metalnikov; Yuri Nagibin; Igor Talankin
- Starring: Innokenty Smoktunovsky; Antonina Shuranova; Kirill Lavrov; Vladislav Strzhelchik
- Music by: Dimitri Tiomkin
- Production company: Mosfilm
- Release date: 1970
- Running time: 157 minutes
- Country: Soviet Union
- Language: Russian

Tchaikovsky (Russian: Чайковский) is a 1970 Soviet biopic film directed by Igor Talankin. It featured Innokenty Smoktunovsky in the role of Russian composer Pyotr Ilyich Tchaikovsky. It was nominated for the Academy Award for Best Foreign Language Film as well as the Academy Award for Original Song Score and Adaptation.

== Plot ==
When Tchaikovsky is composing his First Piano Concerto, his friend Nikolai Grigoryevich Rubinstein refuses to play it at the premiere, considering it unplayable. After the disappointment of Swan Lake, Nadezhda Filaretowna von Meck, a wealthy widow, sends him financial support.

Later, Tchaikovsky embarks on his opera Eugene Onegin, receiving a love letter from student Antonina Ivanovna. His attempt to meet her leads to his brief arrest. He then dedicates his Fourth Symphony to von Meck, who hopes Tchaikovsky's marriage will bring him peace.

Struggling with married life, Tchaikovsky attempts suicide. Von Meck intervenes, offering financial aid to secure his divorce. Meanwhile, Rubinstein, after playing the concerto favorably in Paris, dies. Tchaikovsky declines the opportunity to head the Moscow Conservatory.

Returning to Russia, Tchaikovsky faces criticism for The Maid of Orleans. Von Meck abruptly cuts ties after hosting a party in his honor. Despite attempts to tarnish Tchaikovsky's reputation, he finds success with Queen of Spades.

Learning of von Meck's illness, Tchaikovsky composes his final symphony, Pathétique. He succumbs to cholera shortly after its premiere, marking the end of his prolific career.

== Cast ==
- Innokenty Smoktunovsky as Pyotr Ilyich Tchaikovsky
- Antonina Shuranova as Nadezhda von Meck
- Kirill Lavrov as Władysław Pachulski
- Vladislav Strzhelchik as Nikolai Rubinstein
- Yevgeny Leonov as Alyosha
- Maya Plisetskaya as Désirée Artôt
- Bruno Freindlich as Ivan Turgenev
- Alla Demidova as Yulia von Meck
- Yevgeny Yevstigneyev as Herman Laroche
- Nina Agapova as a guest
- Maria Vinogradova as a lady calling for the police
- Nikolay Trofimov as chief of police
- Laurence Harvey as Narrator (English version)

== See also ==
- List of submissions to the 44th Academy Awards for Best Foreign Language Film
- List of Soviet submissions for the Academy Award for Best International Feature Film
