= Barbara Stettner-Stefańska =

Polish journalist

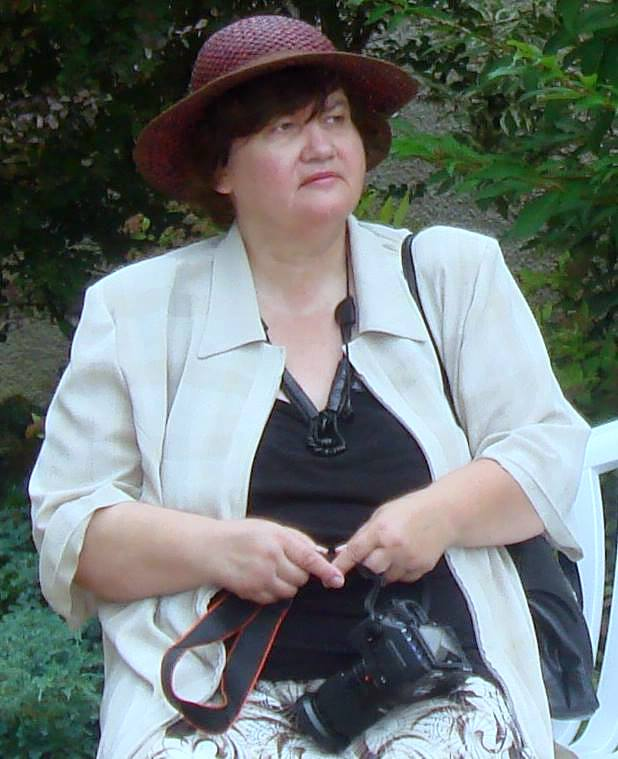
- Barbara Zygmunta Stettner-Stefańska
- Born: 1 April 1945 (age 81); Nowy Sącz, Poland
- Education: University of Warsaw
- Occupations: Writer, journalist
- Years active: 1973 – present
- Notable work: Paris in Polish (Paryż po polsku; 2001); France in Polish (Francja po polsku; 2008); The priest general Witold Kiedrowski (1912–2012) (Ksiądz infułat generał Witold Kiedrowski 1912–2012; 2013).
- Spouse: Andrzej Stefański (1942–2008)

Barbara Stettner-Stefańska (born as Barbara Zygmunta Stettner, April 1, 1945 in Nowy Sącz in Poland) is a Polish journalist, publicist and book author. She has been involved in the promotion of Polish cultural heritage in France.

== Life ==
Barbara Stettner-Stefańska is a daughter of Zygmunt Stettner (1912–1944) - a Home Army soldier in the "Kryska Group" (pseudonym: "The Mountaineer"), who died before her birth in the Warsaw Uprising, while trying to neutralize the German Goliath at 12 Rozbrat Street in Warsaw, and Maria née Kunicka (1909–1996). She was born in Nowy Sącz, where - for security reasons - her mother and older sister Alicja (1938–2014; married Materska) stayed temporarily after leaving occupied Warsaw.

After graduating from the 19th Secondary School in Warsaw named Warsaw insurgents, in the years 1963-1968 she studied at the Faculty of Polish Studies at the University of Warsaw (she prepared her master's thesis under the supervision of Stefan Żółkiewski).

From 1973 to 1991 she was a journalist at the illustrated tourist magazine Światowid, before working at the University of Warsaw's Center for Research on Ancient Tradition (OBTA). After retiring, she worked part-time at the Institute of National Heritage, established by the then Minister of Culture and National Heritage Kazimierz Michał Ujazdowski to research and disseminate Polish culture. She was involved in the 180th anniversary celebrations of the birth of Cyprian Kamil Norwid in Paris, broadcasting reports on Radio France Internationale, and in bringing soil to Wawel Cathedral from the poet's alleged burial place at the Champeaux cemetery in Montmorency.

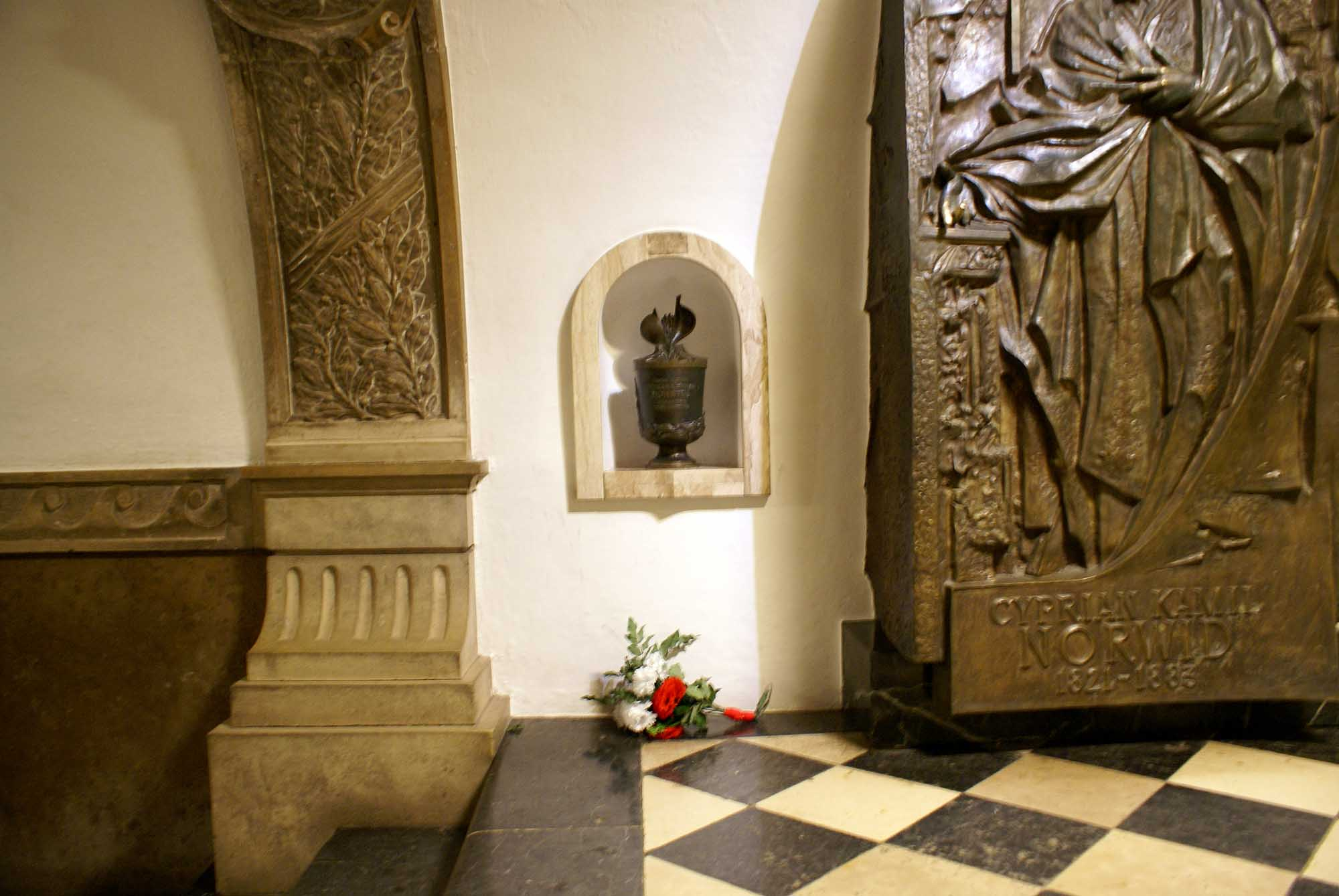
Fragment of the epitaph board of Cyprian Kamil Norwid and an urn with soil from his grave; Crypt of National Bards at Wawel Castle in Kraków (2011)

Stettner-Stefańska has written several books devoted to France and Paris, combining a guide with a historical and essayistic description of French-Polish studies. Dealing with the subject of Polish-French relations, she cooperated with, among others, the priest Stanisław Jeż - rector of the Polish Catholic Mission in France, Leszek Talko - long-time director of Polish Library in Paris and president of the Historical and Literary Society, Irena Wahl-Damasiewicz - emigration activist in France, as well as with photographer and academic lecturer Marek Świątkiewicz and Paweł Osikowski from the Parisian weekly Catholic Voice ("Głos Katolicki").

She has written for the illustrated tourist magazine Światowi, Rzeczpospolita, Get to know your country ("Poznaj swój kraj"), and the Parisian Polish-language weekly Catholic Voice ("Głos Katolicki"). She works to save and promote Polish cultural heritage in France, establishing contact with the Association of Polish Veterans and Their Families in France and other organizations and people involved in commemorating Polish traces on the Seine. She was, among others, co-organizer of the SPK exhibition "The Price of Freedom. Poles on the Fronts of World War II", presented in various places in France. She cooperated with priest Witold Kiedrowski (1912–2012) - emigration activist in France, president of the Association of Polish Veterans and Their Families in France, chaplain and honorary prelate of His Holiness and canon of Polish military chaplaincy, undertaking, among others, preparing a commemorative book for the centenary of his birth (due to the death of the priest, the publication became a commemorative album).

Her husband, Andrzej Stefański (1942–2008), was a journalist of the Polish Press Agency, specializing in sports, a member of the editorial board of the Polish Football magazine ("Polska piłka"; published by Polish Football Association PZPN), a member of the board of the Polish Ice Hockey Federation. She has two children: a daughter Anna and a son Marcin.

In 2001, Stettner-Stefańska was awarded the Meritorious Activist of Culture for commemorating Cyprian Kamil Norwid as part of the celebration of the 180th anniversary of his birth in Poland, France and Italy.

She lives in Warsaw, in Praga-Północ.

== Publications ==
=== Books ===
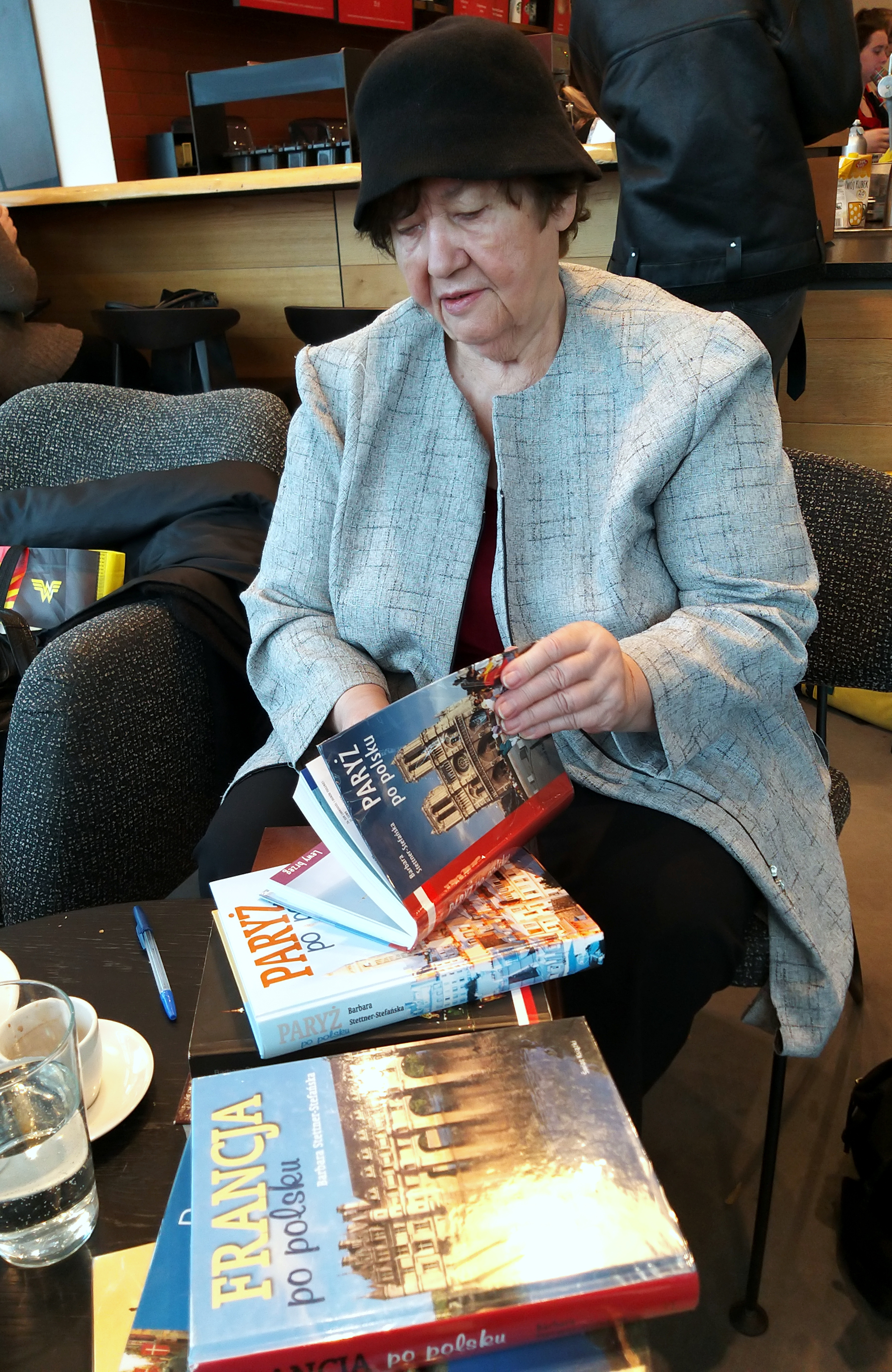
Barbara Stettner-Stefańska with her books: Paris in Polish (2001, 2005) and France in Polish (2008) - Warsaw, December 29, 2023

- Paris in Polish (Paryż po polsku; tourist and historical guide; photographs by the author and Marek Świątkiewicz; Bertelsmann Media Publishing Group - Horyzont, Warszawa 2001, ISBN 83-7311-147-6; second edition: Świat Książki - Bertelsmann Media, Warsaw 2005, ISBN 83-7391 -808-6; third edition updated and supplemented: Goldruk Wojciech Golachowski, Nowy Sącz 2008, ISBN 978-83-247-0426-2);
- A journey through the European Union countries (Podróż po krajach Unii Europejskiej; co-author; together with Liliana Olchowik-Adamowska and Tomasz Ławecki; Świat Książki - Bertelsmann Media, Warsaw 2004, ISBN 83-7391-391-2);
- France in Polish (Francja po polsku; tourist and historical guide; photographs by the author and Marek Świątkiewicz; Świat Książki - Bertelsmann Media, Warsaw 2008, ISBN 83-7391-808-6);
- Holidays with Talleyrand (Wakacje z Talleyrandem; novel; Goldruk Wojciech Golachowski, Nowy Sącz 2008, ISBN 978-83-60900-68-0).

=== Editorial works, studies, participation in collective works (selection) ===
- Stefan Gaspary, Music publishing houses in the bookstore (Wydawnictwa muzyczne w księgarni; guide; author of the study of chapter nine; Zjednoczenie Księgarstwa "Dom Książki", Warsaw 1972);
- Słowacki Days in Paris on the 150th anniversary of the poet's death. October 23–25, 1999 / Journée Słowacki à Paris à l'occasion du 150ème anniversaire de la mort du poète (Dni Słowackiego w Paryżu w 150 rocznicę śmierci poety. 23–25 października 1999; co-author of the study, together with Tomasz Stróżyński; Polish Catholic Mission in France, Paris 1999);
- Jan Kochanowski among question marks (Jan Kochanowski wśród znaków zapytania) in: Małgorzata Jas, Piotr Zbróg, Janusz Detka, Adventure with reading. Textbook for literary and cultural education. Junior high school, class 1 (Przygoda z czytaniem. Podręcznik do kształcenia literacko-kulturowego. Gimnazjum, klasa 1; text in a collective work, pp. 206–211; "MAC Edukacja", Kielce 2001, ISBN 83-7315-077-3);
- Calendar of celebrations of the 180th anniversary of Cyprian Norwid's birth (Kalendarium obchodów 180 rocznicy urodzin Cypriana Norwida) in: Norwid Homeless. On the 180th anniversary of the poet's birth (Norwid Bezdomny. W 180 rocznicę urodzin poety; co-author of the text and photographs; editor: Jacek Kopciński; other authors of the photos: Marek Świątkiewicz, Bartłomiej Zborowski, Photo Service of "L'Osservatore Romano"; other authors of the texts: Jerzy Buzek, Ryszard Legutko, Stefan Sawicki, Tymoteusz Karpowicz, Alina Merdas RSCJ, Kazimierz Braun, priest Antoni Dunajski, Zofia Trojanowiczowa, Michał Masłowski, Wojciech Bonowicz, Aleksander Fiut, Jacek Salij OP, Jadwiga Puzynina, Tomasz Łubieński; Institute of National Heritage - "Bellona" Publishing House, Warsaw 2002, ISBN 83 -11-09504-3);
- House named after Anna and Stanisław Kozłowski in La Ferté-sous-Jouarre. The Polish Catholic Mission in France invites you (Dom im. Anny i Stanisława Kozłowskich w La Ferté sous Jouarre. Polska Misja Katolicka we Francji zaprasza; author of the text; Polish Catholic Mission in France, Paris 2008);
- House of the Polish Catholic Mission Saint Maksymilian Kolbe "Bellevue" in Lourdes. The Polish Catholic Mission in France invites you (Dom Polskiej Misji Katolickiej im. św. Maksymiliana Kolbego "Bellevue" w Lourdes. Polska Misja Katolicka we Francji zaprasza; author of the text; Polish Catholic Mission in France, Paris 2008);
- House of Saint Jack in Corsica. The Polish Catholic Mission in France invites you (Dom św. Jacka na Korsyce. Polska Misja Katolicka we Francji zaprasza; author of the text; Polish Catholic Mission in France, Paris 2008);
- Villa "La Vistule" in Dinard. The Polish Catholic Mission in France invites you (Willa "La Vistule" w Dinard. Polska Misja Katolicka we Francji zaprasza; author of the text; Polish Catholic Mission in France, Paris 2008);
- Witold Urbanowicz. Insatiable artist / Witold Urbanowicz. Artiste irrassasié (Witold Urbanowicz. Artysta nienasycony; album; managing editor; translation into French by Maria Rodowicz, cooperation with Gérard Guillaume; Ministry of Culture and National Heritage - Department of Cultural Heritage, Warsaw 2011, ISBN 978-83-929227-3-5);

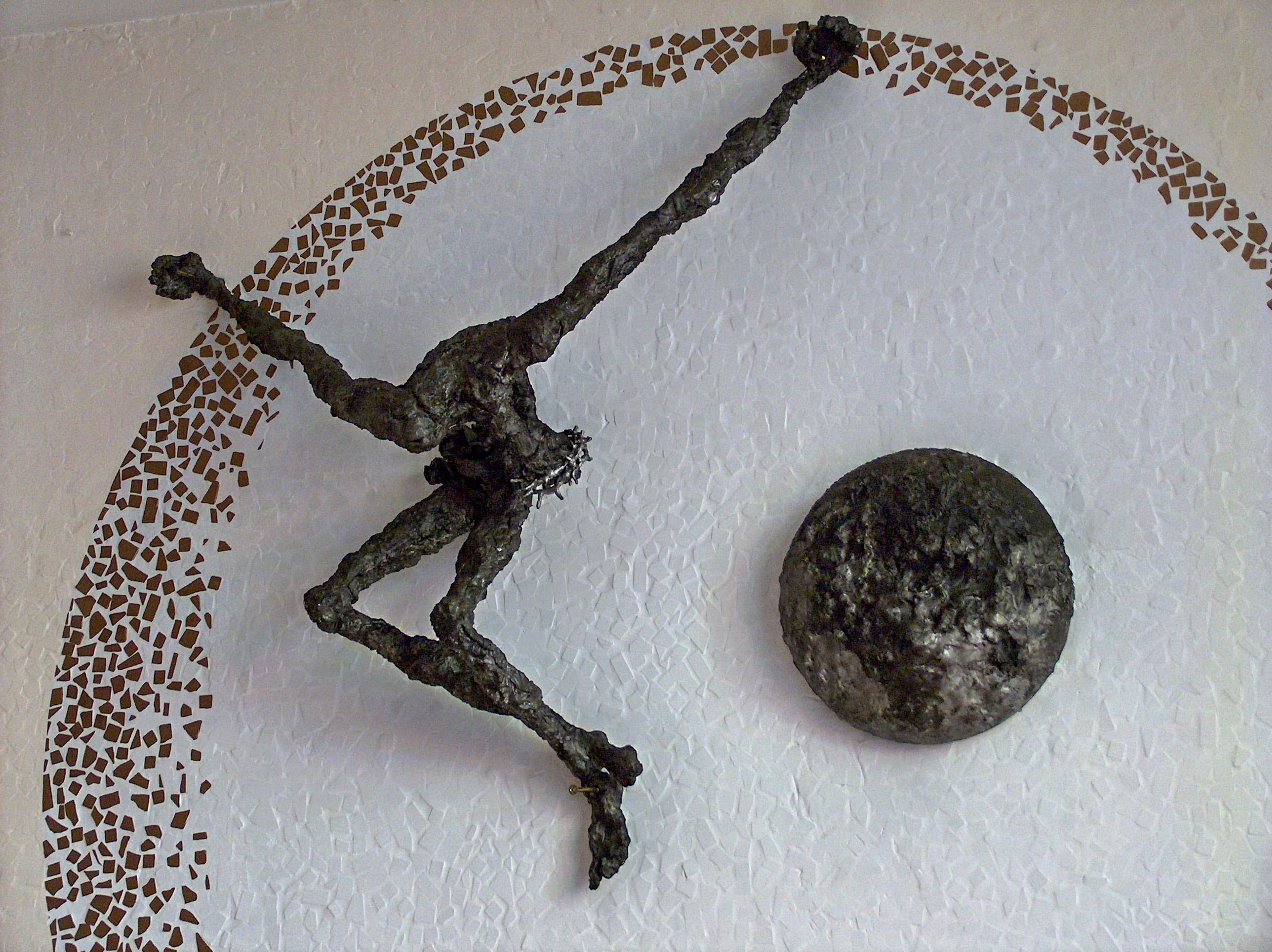
Sculptures by Witold Urbanowicz SAC, described in one of Barbara Stettner-Stefańska's books - chapel in Osny near Paris (2006)

- The ways of life of Witold Kiedrowski, priest and soldier (Drogami życia Witolda Kiedrowskiego, kapłana i żołnierza) in: The priest general Witold Kiedrowski (1912–2012) (Ksiądz infułat generał Witold Kiedrowski (1912–2012); monographic album; managing editor, co-author of the text and photographs, author of the graphic design; also contains the text by Danuta Olesiuk Messages from Majdanek; editor: Justyna Maluga; translation into French Joanna Posyłek; Association of Polish Veterans and Their Families in France National Board - "Bernardinum", Paris - Pelplin 2013, ISBN 978-83-7823-144-8);
- About Witek (O Witku) in: Witold Urbanowicz (album - exhibition catalog of Suwalki District Museum, June 2 - September 30, 2017; publication in Polish and French; co-author; concept, managing editor Eliza Ptaszyńska; Suwalki District Museum, Suwałki 2017, ISBN 978-83-61494-41-6).
