= Murom (disambiguation) =

Murom is a city in Russia.

Murom may also refer to:

- Principality of Murom, a medieval principality
- Murom, Belgorod Oblast, Russia, a rural locality (selo)
- FC Murom, a football club based in the city
- Murom Railway, a Russian former railway that connected Murom and Kovrov
- Murom (pig), a breed of domestic pig
