= Henryk Pachulski =

Polish-born Russian composer

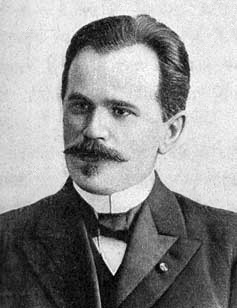
Henryk Pachulski

Henryk Pachulski (16 October 1859 – 2 March 1921) was a Polish-born pianist, composer and teacher who spent most of his life in Russia.

Of noble birth, he was born the son of a surveyor and forester, in Łazy, near Siedlce, Poland. He studied at the Warsaw Institute of Music under Stanisław Moniuszko and Władysław Żeleński, then at the Moscow Conservatory from 1880, studying with Aleksander Michałowski, Pavel Pabst, Nikolai Rubinstein, and Anton Arensky. From 1886 to 1917, he was professor of piano at the conservatory. He never returned to his native country.

Pachulski wrote a Suite for orchestra, a Méditation for string orchestra, a Polish Fantasy for piano and orchestra, works for cello, piano (preludes, études, two sonatas, polonaises, mazurkas, waltzes), and numerous songs, as well as many four-handed piano transcriptions of Tchaikovsky's orchestral music. His Piano Sonata No. 1 in C minor, Op. 19, was dedicated to Arensky, and his Piano Sonata No. 2 in F major, Op, 27, to Sergei Rachmaninoff.

Some of his works have been recorded by Lubow Nawrocka (Henry Pachulski – Piano Works 1, Acte Préalable, Warsaw 2008, AP0187) and Valentina Seferinova and Venera Bojkova (Henryk Pachulski - Piano Works 2, Acte Préalable, London, 2016, AP0361).

His brother Władysław Pachulski (1857–1919) also went to Russia and was employed as a musician by Nadezhda von Meck, the patroness of Pyotr Ilyich Tchaikovsky. He was a secretary to the von Meck family and married von Meck's daughter Yuliya. He is the prime suspect in the breakdown of the relationship between Tchaikovsky and his patroness.

== Discography ==
- 2008 : Piano Works vol. 1 - Acte Préalable AP0187
- 2016 : Piano Works vol. 2 - Acte Préalable AP0361
- 2020 : Piano Works vol. 3 - Acte Préalable AP0487
- 2023 : Władysław & Henryk Pachulski • Rogowski • Szeluto • Rozbicki - String Quartets - Acte Préalable AP0565
- 2024 : Piano Works vol. 4 - Acte Préalable AP0584
