= Łazy, Lublin Voivodeship =

Łazy
- Village
- Location within Poland
- Coordinates: 51°54′59″N 22°25′16″E
- Country: Poland
- Voivodeship: Lublin
- County: Łuków
- Gmina: Łuków
- Population (approx.): 1,030

Łazy [ˈwazɨ] is a village in the administrative district of Gmina Łuków, within Łuków County, Lublin Voivodeship, in eastern Poland.

The Polish pianist and composer Henryk Pachulski was born here, as was his elder brother Władysław Pachulski, also a musician who became the son-in-law of Pyotr Ilyich Tchaikovsky's patroness Nadezhda von Meck and played a significant role in the breakdown of their relationship.
