= Petryaevka railway station =

Railway station in Russia

Petryaevka Петряевка

General information
- Other names: Petriaevka
- Location: Russia
- Coordinates: 56°15′09″N 43°47′57″E
- Owner: Russian Railways
- Operator: Russian Railways

Other information
- Status: Functioning
- Station code: 264907
- Fare zone: Gorky Railway

History
- Opened: 1961
Location

Petryaevka is a railway station in Petryaevka, Nizhny Novgorod Oblast, Russia.
