= Franz Xaver Gebel =

German musician (1787–1843)

Franz Xaver Gebel (1787 – 3 May 1843) was a German composer, music teacher, and conductor.

Gebel was born in Fürstenau, near Breslau, Silesia. He studied under Johann Georg Albrechtsberger and Abbé Vogler, and became Kapellmeister at Leopoldstadt in Vienna in 1810, then worked at a succession of theatres in Pest and Lemberg.

He moved to Moscow in 1817, where he would remain until his death in 1843. He taught piano, and became a significant figure in Moscow's musical life, teaching notable figures such as Nikolai Rubinstein and Alexandre Villoing, and organizing string quartet performances from 1829 to 1835.

He wrote operas, a mass, four symphonies, overtures, string quintets and quartets, and many piano pieces, among other works.
