= Nikolai von Meck =

Russian engineer and entrepreneur (1863–1929)

- Николай фон Мекк
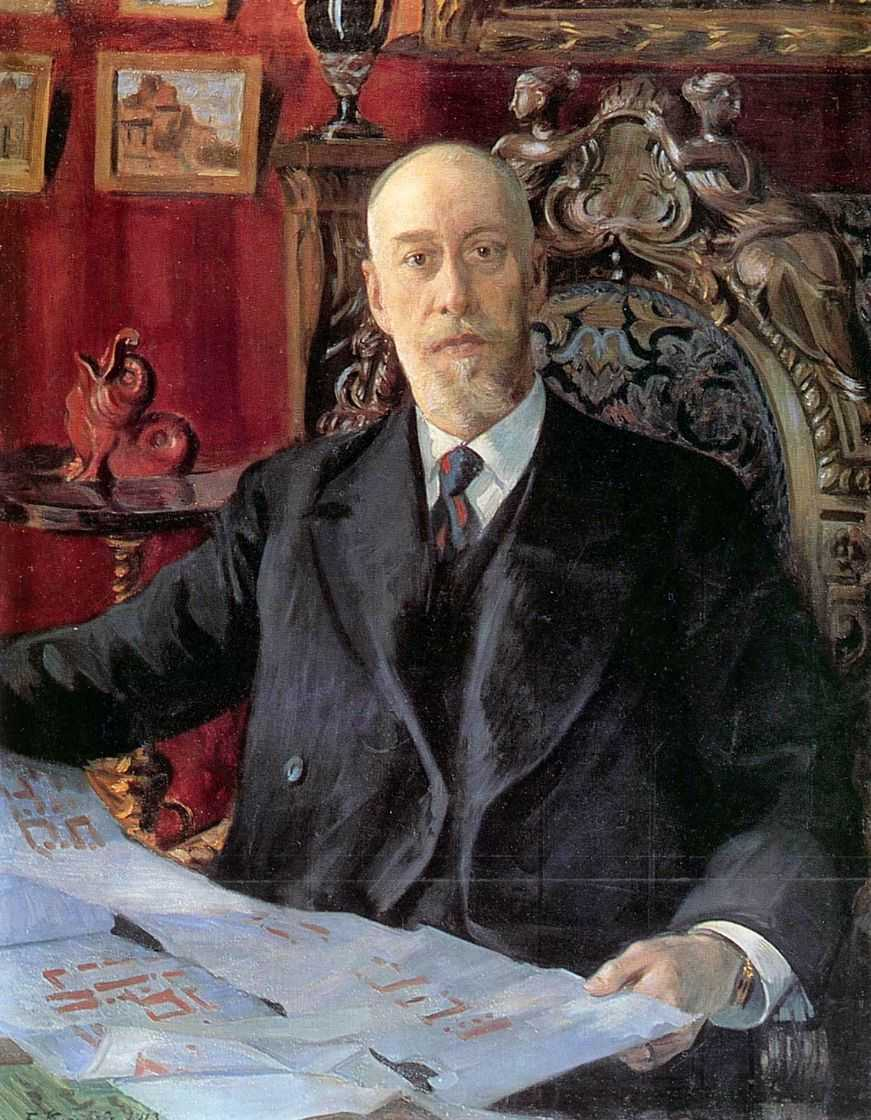
- Portrait by Boris Kustodiev, 1913
- Born: Nikolai Karlovich von Meck; April 28, 1863; Moscow, Russian Empire
- Died: May 24, 1929 (aged 66); Moscow, Russian SFSR, Soviet Union
- Occupations: Engineer; entrepreneur
- Spouse: Anna Davydova
- Parents: Karl Otto Georg von Meck (father); Nadezhda von Meck (mother)

Nikolai Karlovich von Meck (Russian: Никола́й Ка́рлович фон Мекк; 28 April 1863 – 24 May 1929) was a Russian engineer and entrepreneur involved in the development of Russia during the first part of the twentieth century. He was put on trial as part of the Shakhty Trial and executed in 1929.

== Life ==
Nikolai was the sixth son of Karl Otto Georg von Meck, who came from an old Baltic-German noble family originally from Silesia, and Nadezhda von Meck out of eleven children in total. His father, Karl, was among the Russian Empire's first railroad builders after Russia's defeat in the Crimean War motivated the tsar to modernize. Karl died suddenly in 1876. Nadezhda inherited a substantial fortune and became a patron of the arts. Alongside her intense but platonic relationship with Pyotr Tchaikovsky, she also brought Nikolai into contact with such people as Claude Debussy, who stayed with the family as a young man. Nikolai recorded that Debussy acquired the family nickname "le boulliant Achille".

In 1883, Nikolai married Anna Davydova, the niece of Tchaikovsky.

Nikolai von Meck with his wife Anna Davydova

He entered the Imperial College of Law in St. Petersburg. Deciding to give up a career in law and devote himself exclusively to the railway business, he asked his mother permission to leave school without receiving his degree. His lack of higher education did not stop him; having worked as a depot fireman, engineer, and clerk on the Nikolaev Railway, in 1884, he was named a candidate member of the Board of the Moscow–Ryazan Railway. On November 1, 1890, he was named a full Member of the Board.

In April 1891, he was appointed chairman of the Moscow–Kazan Railway. For more than a quarter-century, up to the nationalization in 1918, his name was linked to actively expanding the company and its involvement in developing the Russian transport system. For the first nine years of his management the length of the lines of the Moscow–Kazan Railway increased from 233 kilometers to 2,100 kilometers. This included constructing the Ryazan–Kazan, Ruzaevka–Penza–Szyran–Hinds, Inza–Simbirsy and Timiryazevo–Nizhny Novgorod lines. Achievements of the company were due to von Meck's technical policy to ensure the professionalism of staff, modernization of technical equipment, the thoroughness of the design and survey works. He enjoyed a well-deserved reputation not only from its own employees and business partners, but also in government circles and among members of the ruling house. The composition of the company's shareholders included major banks of Russia.

In 1903, as chairman of the Board of the Moscow–Kazan Railway, responsible for organizing the pilgrimage of Nicholas II and his family in the Sarov monastery. Nikolai von Meck at the beginning of Russian-Japanese War led charity cargoes sent to the Far East Department of the Committee of Grand Duchess to raise funds in aid of the army under the shadow of the Russian Red Cross Society.

To promote training, he opened technical schools and the Company participated in the dissemination of educational books. It supported the organization of consumer cooperatives for the supply of railroad products.

In 1912, the Moscow-sorting station began to build an apartment building, and the station Prozorovskaya founded a settlement, offering employees loans for purchase of plots in the amount of three-year salary for a period of 10 years. The project involved the improvement of electricity and telephone networks, water supply, tram lines, hospitals, buildings of public meetings. Full implementation of plans was thwarted when the war began in 1914.

In 1899, he bought one of the first motor cars in Russia due to his interest in motor sport racing. In 1903 he helped found and became the first head of the Moscow Automobile Club, the organising and participating in the first Russian automobile races in 1910–1911. He owned the Moscow license plates 84, 588 and 679.

Grand Duchess Elizabeth Feodorovna said that he was "an honest servant of the King and Fatherland".

== Active member of many societies ==
- Member of the Russian Automobile Society (RAA), Kiev Automobile Club (KAC), Life Member, formed in 1910 by the Imperial Russian Automobile Society (IRAS) - committee member, vice-president, and a member of the technical commission.
- Member of the Board of the Russian Society of the Sea, river and land transport and Insurance of luggage and warehouses with the issuance of loans;
- Honorary trustee, honorary member of the volunteer fire brigade of Fominsk city;
- Fellow trustee of Trinity Hospital for terminally-ill women Society for the Promotion of diligence in Moscow;
- Member of the Imperial Philanthropic Society;
- Treasurer warehouse handicrafts was held under the patronage of Her Most August Imperial Highness the Grand Duchess Elizabeth Feodorovna;
- Member of the Moscow branch of the Imperial Russian Musical Society;
- Member of the supervisory board of the Office of the Moscow Synodal School of Church Singing and Synod choir (the Moscow Synodal office in the Kremlin, the Head - Duke A.A.Shirinsky-Shikhmatov);
- A member of the Finance Committee, the Moscow Province Zemstvo Assembly 1913–1915;
- Deputy Chairman of the Moscow Society of Aeronautics PA von Plehve (1910);
- Member of the organizing committee of the Moscow to collect donations on the fleet, donor funds for the construction of an airplane in 1913;
- Member of the Russian-American Chamber of Commerce;
- Member of the Historical and Genealogical Society in Moscow;
- Board of Trustees of a famous girls' school Bess, later its owner;
- Member of the Society spread of useful books;
- Member of the Board of the Russian-Asian Bank.

== After the Russian Bolshevik Revolution ==
After the nationalization of the Moscow–Kazan Railway in 1918, von Meck hoped that his knowledge and experience would continue to be useful to the new Soviet state. He continued to take an interest in developing the railway transport system and was a consultant to the financial and economic department of the People's Commissariat of Railways. He represented the Commissar on the State Planning Commission. Von Meck outlined his ideas in economics and prospects for domestic rail transport in a series of books published between 1921 and 1927.

Despite this, due to his "bourgeois" origins, he was repeatedly arrested on various charges from 1919 onward, accused of, among other things, "counter-revolutionary speeches against the Soviet system" and being part of a "technological counter-revolution." He was arrested for the final time in 1928, and in May 1929 the OGPU (forerunner of the KGB) sentenced him to death for wrecking; that is, attempts to sabotage Soviet authority through substandard work. His execution was announced on 24 May 1929. He was rehabilitated in 1990 by the Plenum of the Supreme Court of the USSR.

== Family ==
Nikolai and Anna had six children:

- Kira (1885–1969) mother of the Polish literature and linguistics professor Jadwiga Puzynina (1928-2025)
- Andrew (died in childhood)
- Marc (1890–-1918, executed in Omsk)
- Galina (1891–1985, England) (Author of a book "As I remember them", London, 1973; translator of correspondence between Tchaikovsky and her family)
- Attal (1894–1916, died July 15 at his first battle, WW1)
- Lyutsella (1896–1933)

In 1904, von Meck adopted Helen, whose parents Nikolai Karlovich barrister Alexander Hackman and his wife died during the cholera epidemic. She became the mother of Academician Nikita N. Moiseev.
