= Alexandre Villoing =

Russian pianist and music teacher (1804–1878)

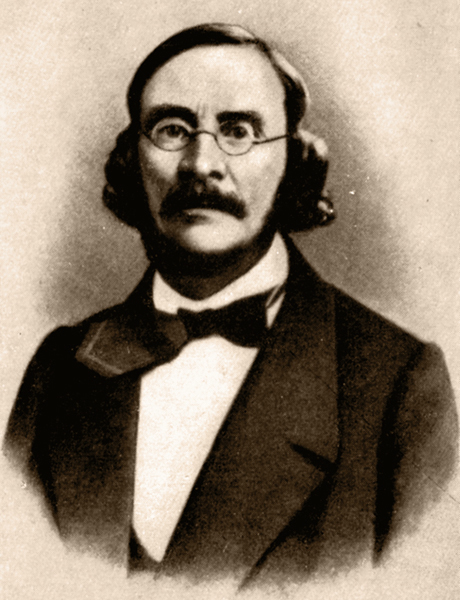
Alexandre Villoing

Alexandre Villoing (Russian: Александр Иванович Виллуан, romanized: Aleksandr Ivanovich Villuan; 12 March [O.S. 29 February] 1804 (Note: His birth date is also given as 10 March [O.S. 27 February] 1804 and c. 1808 in some other sources.) – 2 September [O.S. 21 August] 1878) was a Russian pianist and music teacher best known for teaching Anton and Nikolai Rubinstein.

== Biography ==
Alexandre Villoing was born in Moscow to a French émigré. At twelve years old, he was sent to the Golitsyn Hospital to study pharmacy, where he stayed until 1821. He later abandoned pharmacy and studied music with Franz Xaver Gebel and John Field. Villoing lived and taught music across the country from 1823 to 1830. He moved to Moscow in the 1830s.

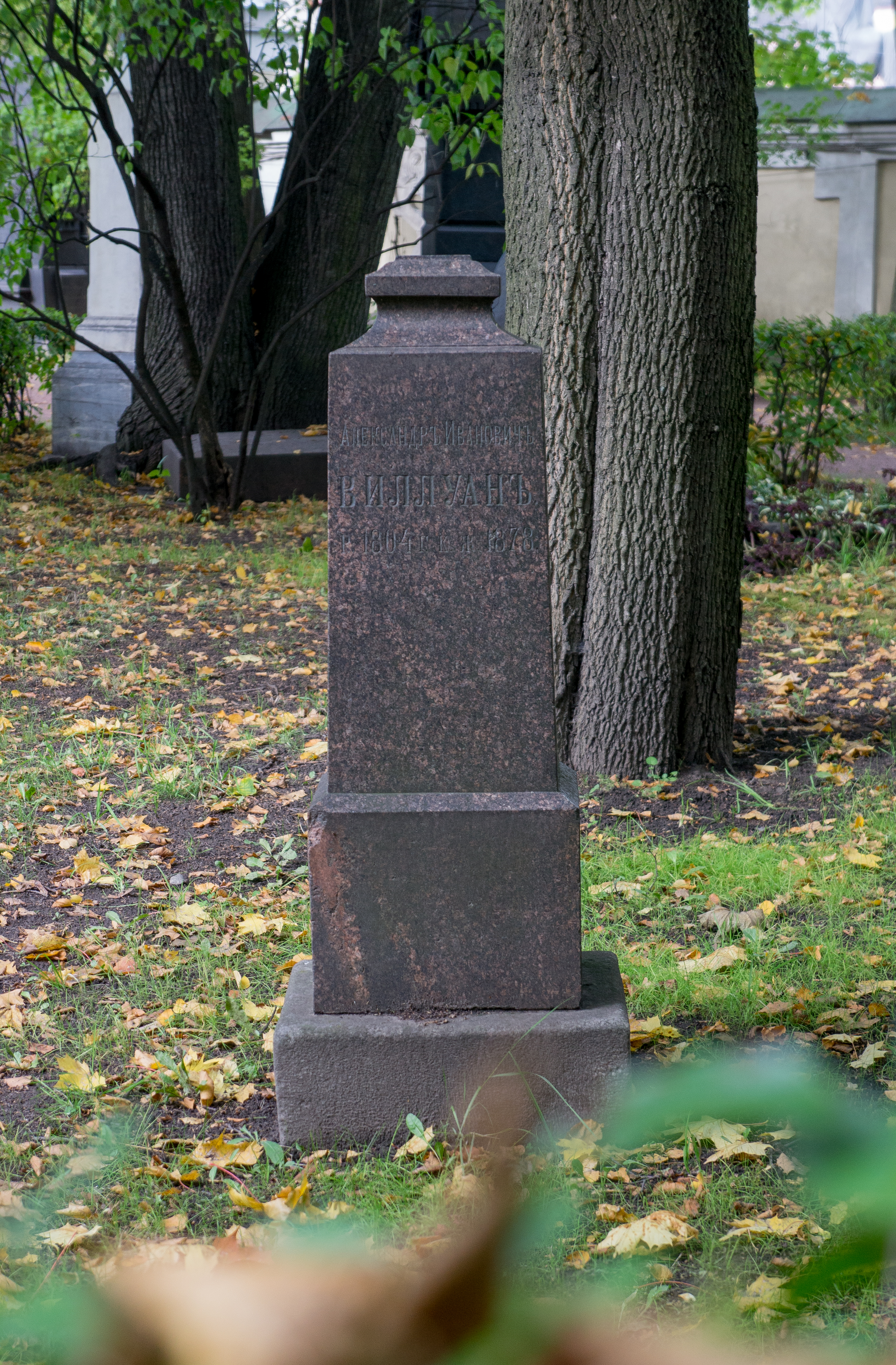
Grave of Alexandre Villoing in the Tikhvin Cemetery, Alexander Nevsky Lavra

Around 1837, he took on Anton Rubinstein as a pupil. Villoing accompanied Rubinstein on his trip to Paris, sent by his mother, where his pupil unsuccessfully sought to enroll in the Paris Conservatory and performed in the Salle Érard. Villoing took Rubinstein on a tour of Europe, where Rubinstein gave concerts to great success. His teaching was highly praised. He also taught Nikolai Rubinstein.

Returning to Russia, he enjoyed a reputation as a piano teacher. He took his stepdaughters to Paris, where they first appeared in a concert on 17 February 1862. Villoing returned to Moscow in the same year and moved to Saint Petersburg in September. Aside from the piano, he also played the string instruments. He also gave violin lessons. Impoverished, Villoing died in Saint Petersburg. He was buried at the Tikhvin Cemetery.

Villoing was an assistant to Anton Rubinstein at the Saint Petersburg Conservatory from 1863 to 1865. There his students included: Vasily Safonov, Anna Yesipova, Carl Sicke, and Pyotr Gubitsky.

== Works ==
Villoing authored the piano method Shkole dlya fortepiano (Школе для фортепиано). It was published in 1863 (second edition 1871) and was approved by the Saint Petersburg Conservatory for use in teaching. It was translated into French under the name l'Ecole pratique du piano and published by Heugel in Paris.

He also composed exercises for piano, which he called the Rubinstein Exercises, two piano concertos, a violin concerto, two overtures, etc. Most of his works were not published.
