= Władysław Pachulski =

Polish violinist, pianist and amateur composer

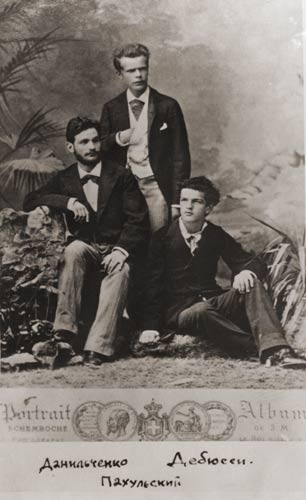
Pachulski (center) with Danilchenko and Debussy

Władysław Pachulski (c. 1855 – 1919) was a Polish violinist, pianist and amateur composer who was the secretary to and later son-in-law of Nadezhda von Meck, the patroness for 13 years of Pyotr Ilyich Tchaikovsky. Pachulski was often the intermediary between composer and patroness, who had agreed never to meet face to face but to conduct an epistolary relationship. He played a significant role in the events surrounding the sudden break between them in 1890, and probably even instigated it.

He lived in Russia most of his adult life, where his name was rendered as Владислав Альбертович Пахульский (Vladislav Al'bertovich Pakhul'sky). He was the elder brother of the composer Henryk Pachulski.

== Biography ==
Władysław Pachulski was born in Łazy, Lublin Voivodeship, Congress Poland in 1855 or 1857, to a poor family. He studied at the Moscow Conservatory and one of his teachers there for some time was Pyotr Ilyich Tchaikovsky. In 1877 Tchaikovsky left the Conservatory to become a full-time composer, with the ongoing financial support of a wealthy widow, Nadezhda von Meck. A very unusual feature of their arrangement was that they agreed never to meet, but would communicate only by letter or messenger. Another of Tchaikovsky's students, and later possibly his lover, was Iosif Kotek. On Tchaikovsky's recommendation, von Meck had engaged Kotek as her house musician. She had a succession of musicians in her coterie, none of whom lasted long, and before long Kotek too was dismissed. Pachulski succeeded Kotek, and he proved to be the only musician who ever gained a permanent place in her affections. The difference was that he was not recommended by Tchaikovsky, whose opinion of his musical talents was always very low. Pachulski in fact made his own introductions to von Meck. On 4 January 1878, she wrote to Tchaikovsky saying that one of his former pupils (unnamed) was writing to her constantly, saying that life at the Conservatory was not the same since Tchaikovsky had left. Just why she regarded Pachulski so favourably in the first place is not clear. His father Albert Pachulski managed one of von Meck's estates, although it is not known whether he was already there at that time or came later. Maybe it was because Władysław showed the same love of Tchaikovsky's music as she herself felt. Whatever her reasons, she offered him employment, and immediately began asking Tchaikovsky to provide him with lessons and advice. This he agreed to, because he felt an obligation to show his gratitude for her generosity towards him; he also felt it appropriate to make his assessments of Pachulski's skills as favourable as he could, without sacrificing his artistic integrity. However, he soon found it burdensome and tiresome.

Pachulski considered himself extremely gifted, and von Meck also had an exaggerated opinion of his musical talents, due no doubt to her personal regard for him; he was a constant topic of her correspondence with Tchaikovsky through 1878. Thanks to this over-elevated self-regard, even the most tactful of Tchaikovsky's negative criticisms of his compositional abilities caused him great pain. The constant theme of Tchaikovsky's remarks was that Pachulski had musical ability, desire, zeal, intelligence and warm feeling, but not the proper balance between these qualities, owing to "an organic, and … enigmatic, defect of his musical nature" (as he wrote in a letter to von Meck in August 1883). He wrote to his brother Anatoly in August 1879 that Pachulski "has certain features of a Turgenevan hero, who has genuine and ardent desires to fulfill grandiose plans but ..." (leaving unsaid the inference that he does not possess the artistic capacity to do so).

Pachulski made himself invaluable to von Meck, and she described him as an exemplary secretary; she later said she would never find another like him; she taught him everything he knew about travel, foreign languages and financial affairs. She described his heart as “rare and unparalleled”, which earned him her respect despite his youth (he was aged between 20 and 23 at this time; she was aged 46).

After the first performance of Tchaikovsky's 4th Symphony on 10 February 1878, which was dedicated to Nadezhda von Meck, Władysław Pachulski spoke about nothing else for days and constantly played excerpts on the piano, which helped her understand the work more deeply. Later that year Tchaikovsky agreed to von Meck's idea of empowering Pachulski to negotiate directly with Édouard Colonne regarding the French premiere of the 4th Symphony, although he doubted Colonne would agree to perform the work.

Claude Debussy, then a struggling composition student from the Paris Conservatoire, was employed in the von Meck household on three occasions between 1880 and 1882, as house pianist and music master to her children. He also accompanied the family on their visits to Europe. During their stay in Florence in 1880, he wrote his Premier Trio en Sol (First Trio in G) for a piano trio comprising himself on piano, Pachulski on violin, and the cellist Pyotr Danilchenko. Debussy proposed marriage to Nadezhda von Meck's daughter Sophie, and shortly afterwards found himself on his way back to Paris.

In June 1883, Tchaikovsky wrote to his brother Modest, describing Pachulski's latest symphony as "frightful rubbish" and "abominable scribblings", and expressed what a pity it was that, for fear of upsetting his patroness, he could not tell Pachulski frankly of the utter futility of his mania to compose. Tchaikovsky had previously written to Anatoly complaining of how often he had to work with Pachulski, and also how personally unappealing he was. Pachulski would have by now sensed the ill will that Tchaikovsky felt towards him personally, not just the low opinion he had for his compositions.

Pachulski's role in the von Meck household began to increase throughout 1884, and he made renewed efforts in his composing. In February he had some works performed by a small orchestra at Cannes, and was given to understand that Colonne would be interested enough to program them. This never happened.

In September 1884, Pachulski's father Albert, who was the manager of the Pleshcheyevo estate, intervened in the sleeping arrangements for Tchaikovsky's servant Alyosha Sofronov, which put Tchaikovsky's nose markedly out of joint, and there was an unpleasant altercation. Tchaikovsky wrote to Pachulski about this, and the next day Albert asked to see him to explain things, but was turned away. Pachulski wrote to the composer to apologise for the misunderstanding and asked him to forgive his father. This was a relatively trivial incident in itself, but it enabled Tchaikovsky to release some of the built up irritation he had long felt towards Pachulski junior, even if it was now visited upon his relatively innocent father.

In March 1885, Nadezhda von Meck asked Tchaikovsky to use his good offices to find Pachulski's younger brother Henryk a teaching position at the Moscow Conservatory. Henryk had been studying there since 1880 under Nikolai Rubinstein, Anton Arensky and others. Tchaikovsky's efforts came to nothing but Henryk did succeed in gaining a position there the following year.

Władysław Pachulski's nervous condition was a frequent topic of Nadezhda von Meck's letters to Tchaikovsky in 1886 and 1887. His musical studies with Tchaikovsky had ceased for now. In July 1887 she wrote that he was constantly fearful, expecting to be arrested at every moment, and believing others were conspiring against him.

But things improved for Pachulski. On 22 September 1888, von Meck announced that he was engaged to her favourite daughter Yuliya, and that they had been conducting an affair for the past 7 years. Von Meck regarded this as "a great grief", not because of any negative feelings about Pachulski, but because she would be losing a daughter "who is essential to me, without whom my existence is impossible". Pachulski and Yuliya Karlovna von Meck married in Paris on 16 April 1889. Pachulski was now in an excellent position, were he so minded, to exact some revenge for what he perceived as slights towards him from his musical idol Tchaikovsky.

During 1889 the von Meck estates experienced severe financial difficulties, leading to Nadezhda becoming ill and unable to write. For many months, Tchaikovsky's only contact with her was through Władysław Pachulski. Pachulski had resumed composing and Tchaikovsky was now even more resigned to keeping on giving polite critiques of work he despised.

On 1 July 1890, without any explanation, Nadezhda von Meck sent Tchaikovsky his entire annual allowance of 6,000 rubles in advance; she had always previously paid it in smaller instalments. On 13 September she wrote to him in Tiflis, expressing dismay at her children's financial affairs, but giving no hint of any change to her arrangement with the composer. On 22 September, Tchaikovsky received another letter from her, informing him she was bankrupt and she could no longer subsidise him. This letter is no longer extant, but to judge from the reply he drafted the same day, she apparently accused him of keeping her in his thoughts only while he enjoyed her munificence. He denied this absolutely, told her how much these words pained him, and pledged to always keep her in his affections. He was not to know it at the time, but it was the last letter he ever wrote her. It is also very likely that she never saw this reply. This completely unheralded cessation of an arrangement that had been in existence for 13 years can reasonably be attributed to the influence of others, most likely members of her family. She had known of her financial difficulties for over a year but had never hinted they would affect the arrangement. There is no evidence that von Meck intended their correspondence or their friendship to end merely because her financial support of him was no longer possible.

That Władysław Pachulski was the main instigator of this affair was a charge made by Tchaikovsky's devoted servant Alyosha Sofronov in a letter of 13 October 1890; by Yuri Davydov; by Nadezhda von Meck's granddaughter Olga Bennigsen; and by many later commentators. But it remains in the realm of conjecture.

Tchaikovsky received no reply to his letter to von Meck of 22 September, so he wrote to Pachulski, who corresponded with him throughout November, keeping him abreast of von Meck's poor state of health, but also conveying her good wishes.

On 3 January 1891 Pachulski wrote to Tchaikovsky, blaming himself for the situation they were in, and saying that his admiration and respect for the composer, and that of the whole von Meck household for him, was undiminished. In particular, he told Tchaikovsky that he had shown Nadezhda his letter, and he passed on her assurances that her attitude to him was unchanged. But Nadezhda never again wrote to Tchaikovsky personally to convey such expressions of regard, or anything else.

Anna (Davydova) von Meck, Tchaikovsky's niece, who had married Nadezhda's son Nikolai, later provided evidence that Pachulski was playing one side off against the other through what Poznansky names an "outright lie". Nadezhda complained bitterly to Anna that her uncle Tchaikovsky had promised to continue writing to her after her subsidy stopped, but he never again did. It is clear that Nadezhda was never shown any of Tchaikovsky's later letters, and the supposed expressions of her regard sent via Pachulski were simply made up by him. So, while it cannot be conclusively proven that Pachulski instigated the stopping of the subsidy, there is no doubt that he made sure the break between patroness and composer became total and bitter and permanent.

For his part, Tchaikovsky was deeply offended by von Meck's apparent sudden lack of interest in him. It was not so much that she did not personally write to him anymore, because he knew she was chronically ill, but that the messages he received from Pachulski about her ceased to include any enquiries from her about his welfare, his music or his life, and they were reduced to meaningless politenesses. Tchaikovsky made it very clear to Pachulski that he wanted and needed his relationship with Nadezhda to continue unchanged in the slightest degree, despite the cessation of her financial support. He expressed this in his letter to Pachulski of 6 June 1891, after eight months of waiting fruitlessly for a reply from von Meck.

Pachulski then advised that even his own relationship with his mother-in-law had changed greatly and he could no longer be an intermediary between her and Tchaikovsky. He returned Tchaikovsky's letter of 6 June, presumably to prevent von Meck or her family ever seeing it and becoming aware of his machinations. This was the last contact Tchaikovsky ever had with Pachulski or with Nadezhda von Meck or her household (other than his niece Anna).

Tchaikovsky died two years and five months later, bitter and resentful to the end about what he saw as Nadezhda von Meck's betrayal of him. For her part, she sent an expensive wreath but did not attend his funeral (she was very ill and moved with great difficulty). She died in Nice, France only three months later.

Nothing more is recorded about Władysław Pachulski apart from his death in Moscow in 1919, aged 62 or 64. None of his music was ever published (at least 4 works were published: String Quartet in E minor (recorded by Acte Préalable AP0565), Wellegesang for orchestra, Andante for orchestra and Albumblatt for piano) or performed by a professional orchestra, and none of it is known to have survived in manuscript. His wife Yuliya died in 1915.

None of Pachulski's many letters to Tchaikovsky have survived, but nine of Tchaikovsky's to Pachulski are extant.

== Discography ==
- 2023 : Władysław & Henryk Pachulski • Rogowski • Szeluto • Rozbicki - String Quartets - Acte Préalable AP0565

== Sources ==
- Alexander Poznansky, Tchaikovsky: The Quest for the Inner Man, Lime Tree, 1991
