= Karl Otto Georg von Meck =

Russian businessman (1821–1876)

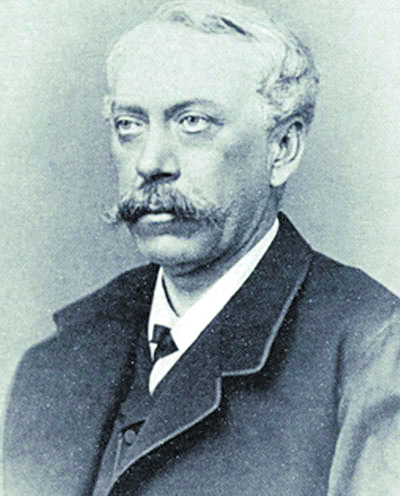
Karl von Meck (date unknown)

Karl Otto Georg von Meck (Russian: Карл Фёдорович фон Мекк, romanized: Karl Fyodorovich fon Mekk; 22 June 1821 – 26 January 1876) was a Russian businessman of Baltic German descent who was one of the founders of Russian railway transport.

== Family ==
Baron Karl von Meck came from an old Baltic-German noble family originally from Silesia. His father was major Otto Adam von Meck, a customs officer in Riga. His mother was Wilhelmine Hafferberg, a daughter of Friedrich Wilhelm and Catharine Constanze Nott, who in her second marriage was the wife of Carl Ludwig von Veichtner, a son of composer Franz Adam Veichtner.

In 1844 Karl von Meck graduated from the St. Petersburg Institute of Communications and joined the Moscow-Warsaw road upgrade project as a service road engineer. In 1860 von Meck left public service and entered business. After the military defeat in Crimea many people became aware of the importance of rail transportation. Von Meck entered the Saratov Railway Association with the aim of constructing a private rail line between Moscow and Saratov with independent finance. The first phase of construction was the line between Moscow and Kolomna. This site was put into operation, after only two years work, as the funds of the company had been exhausted and the entire operation quickly went bankrupt.

Karl von Meck persevered and in 1863 found work with the new Moscow-Ryazan Railway Association. The Chairman of the Board appointed von Meck as the main contractor and the road was built over a year and a half, and made an enormous profit. Karl von Meck participated in several other railway ventures but none with such financial success. However his diligence, tenacity and effort were widely recognised and acknowledged.

Karl von Meck died on 26 January 1876, in Moscow. After his death his widow, Nadezhda von Meck, provided invaluable assistance to Pyotr Ilyich Tchaikovsky. Karl von Meck's son, Nikolai von Meck, played a significant role in the development of Russian railways and worked on the People's Commissariat of Railroads until he was arrested for wrecking in 1928. He was convicted and executed in 1929.

== Literature ==
- Гавлин М. Л. Династия «железнодорожных королей» фон Мекк
- Solzhenitsyn, Aleksandr I., The Gulag Archipelago (1973), pp. 44–45 (1st ed.). Harper & Row. ISBN 0-06-080332-0.
