= Jadwiga Puzynina =

Polish linguist (1928–2025)

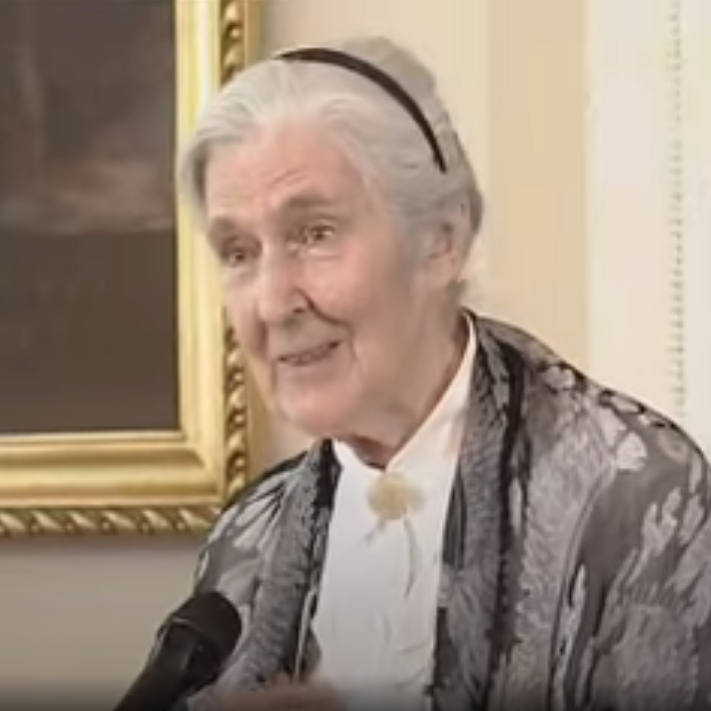
- Born: Jadwiga Zapolska; 29 January 1928; Rozhyshche, Second Polish Republic
- Died: 8 February 2025 (aged 97); Warsaw, Poland
- Resting place: Pantheon of Great Poles, Warsaw
- Spouse: Czesław Puzynina
- Children: 3

Jadwiga Puzynina (née Zapolska; 29 January 1928 – 8 February 2025) was a Polish linguist, literature researcher, academic, and professor of humanities. She was an honoree of the Order of the White Eagle.

== Biography ==
In 1943–44, she belonged to the Grey Ranks. In 1946, she graduated from the 6th Secondary School named after Tadeusz Reytan in Warsaw, and in 1951, she studied Polish studies at the University of Warsaw. She then obtained doctoral and habilitated doctor degrees. In 1987, she received the title of professor in the field of humanities. She was professionally associated with the University of Warsaw for several dozen years, and also worked at Cardinal Stefan Wyszyński University. In 1983, at the Faculty of Polish Studies at the University of Warsaw, she organized and took over the management of the Cyprian Norwid Language Dictionary Workshop. In 1976, she signed Memorial 101, a letter of protest to the Sejm of the Polish People's Republic against changes to the constitution. She cooperated with the Workers' Defense Committee, and after the introduction of Martial law, she helped repressed students. On May 13, 1982, she was interned for several days for her activities.

Active national member of the Polish Academy of Arts and Sciences, member of the Linguistics Committee of the Polish Academy of Sciences and the Warsaw Scientific Society. She sat on the board of the Polish Linguistic Society. She was the author and co-author of Polish language textbooks for secondary schools (including the repeatedly reissued Language and Us: a Polish language textbook for the first grade of secondary schools, written together with Stanisław Dubisz and Maria Nagajowa).

Member of the Polish Language Council at the Presidium of the Polish Academy of Sciences from the beginning of its existence (i.e. since 1996); she co-created subsequent spelling resolutions of the RJP. She was the chairwoman of the Teaching Committee, later she became the chairwoman of the Ethics of Word Team of the RJP PAN, which she initiated.

== Personal life ==
She was the daughter of Aleksander Zapolski and the Russian Kira von Meck, daughter of Nikolai von Meck and granddaughter of Nadezhda von Meck. She was married to Czesław Puzynina, with whom she had three children (Wojciech, Stanisław and Joanna).

She was buried on February 15, 2025, in the Pantheon of Great Poles in the Temple of Divine Providence in Warsaw.
