= Franz Adam Veichtner =

German violinist and composer (1741–1822)

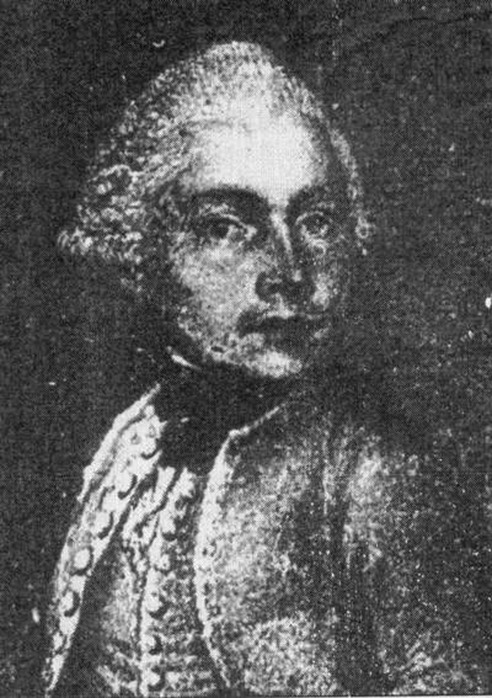
Franz Adam Veichtner

Franz Adam Veichtner, also known as "Feichtner" (baptised 10 February 1741 – 3 March 1822) was a German violinist and composer of the classical era.

== Life ==
Veichtner was born in Regensburg, where his father, Johann Georg, worked as a violin maker. In his youth he studied at the Jesuit school in his hometown and later with the violinist, composer and theorist Joseph Riepel. Support from a generous benefactor enabled him to study violin with Franz Benda in Potsdam where he performed and made acquaintances with Carl Friedrich Fasch and Carl Philipp Emanuel Bach.

In 1763, Veichtner entered into the service of Count Herman Karl von Keyserling in Königsberg and Saint Petersburg. In Königsberg, Veichtner taught the young Johann Friedrich Reichardt, who he called a "true artistic genius" who despised "all external pomp". To show his gratitude, Reichardt dedicated a violin concerto to his teacher in 1772. In 1765 Veichtner became Konzertmeister and Kapellmeister at the court of Peter von Biron in Mitau, Courland. He was joined in the orchestra by his brother Michael who was employed first as a violinist, and later as a "contra violinist". During his time in Mitau, Veichtner taught music and composed prolifically for the court. He is known to have composed numerous Singspiele, occasional works, Tafelmusik and around sixty symphonies during this period, however very little of this music seems to have survived. Veichtner also married twice while resident in Mitau; first to Catharina Maria Göttsch on 26 January 1768, and again to Rosanna Göttsch in 1771. In 1785, he undertook a trip with the court to Italy, giving successful concerts in Milan and other cities.

In 1795, Veichtner left Mitau, when the Duchy of Courland was annexed by Russia, and traveled for a second time to Italy. In 1798, he found employment in Saint Petersburg where he worked as a chamber musician at the imperial court, and concertmaster of the opera orchestra. He remained in Saint Petersburg until his retirement in 1820. He returned to Mitau where he spent the final two years of his life with his eldest son, Karl Ludwig, and his family in the Forstei Kliewenhof (now the parish in Kalnciems).

Veichtner had nine children. One of his sons, Heinrich Konstantin, was a violinist (father of poet and editor - Konstantin von Veichtner). Another, Karl Ludwig, married to Cath. Constanze Nott, was a step-father of baroness Wilhelmine von Meck, mother of Russian businessman Karl Otto Georg von Meck.

== Works ==
- 4 Symphonies (published Mitau: Wilhelm August Steidel & Co., 1770)
- Simphonie russienne (published Riga: Johann Friedrich Hartknoch; Berlin: Johann Julius Hummel, 1771)
- 2 Divertimenti (published Berlin: Johann Julius Hummel; Amsterdam: au Grand Magazin de Musique, n.d.[1775])
- Violin Concerto in A-flat major (published Riga, Johann Friedrich Hartknoch, 1775) also in manuscript (Sing-Akademie zu Berlin) Listed in Breitkopf, 1776-77
- Opera Scipio 1778
- Singspiel Cephalus und Prokris (published Berlin, 1779)
- Singspiel Cyrus und Cassandana 1784 (manuscript in Staats- und Universitätsbibliothek Carl von Ossietzky, Hamburg)
- Oratorio Erste Feier der Himmelfahrt Jesu 1787
- Hymn Herr Gott dich loben wir 1787 (manuscript in Universitäts- und Landesbibliothek, Bonn)
- 6 Sonatas for violin and cello (published Saint Petersburg: Gerstenberg & Dittmar, 1797)
- 3 String Quartets, op. 3 (published Saint Petersburg: Gerstenberg & Dittmar; Berlin: Johann Julius Hummel; Amsterdam: au Grand Magazin de Musique, 1802)
- 24 Fantaisies pour le violon seul, op. 7 (published Milan, Ricordi; Leipzig, Breitkopf & Härtel, 1815)
- Six sonates pour le violon avec accompagnement de la basse, op. 8 (published Milan, Ricordi; Leipzig, Breitkopf & Härtel, 1815)
- Arietta russa con variazioni e un capriccio pour violon et bass, op. 9 (published Leipzig, Breitkopf & Härtel, 1815)
- Te Deum Betet an den großen Gott 1818 (manuscript in Stadtbibliothek, Leipzig)
- Violin Concerto in E-flat major (manuscript in Staatsbibliothek zu Berlin) Listed in Breitkopf, 1772
- Violin Concerto in A major (manuscript in Hochschule für Musik Franz Liszt, Hochschularchiv, Weimar) Incomplete parts; violin solo and violin 1 only.
