= Murom Railway =

Railway line in Vladimir Oblast, Russia

Coordinates: 56.0000°N 41.6000°E

The 1,520 mm (4 ft 11 27/32 in) broad gauge Murom Railway (Russian: Муромская железная дорога, or Muromskaya zheleznaya doroga) is a subdivision of the state-owned Gorky Railway in Russia. It was built between the towns of Kovrov and Murom in 1874-1880.

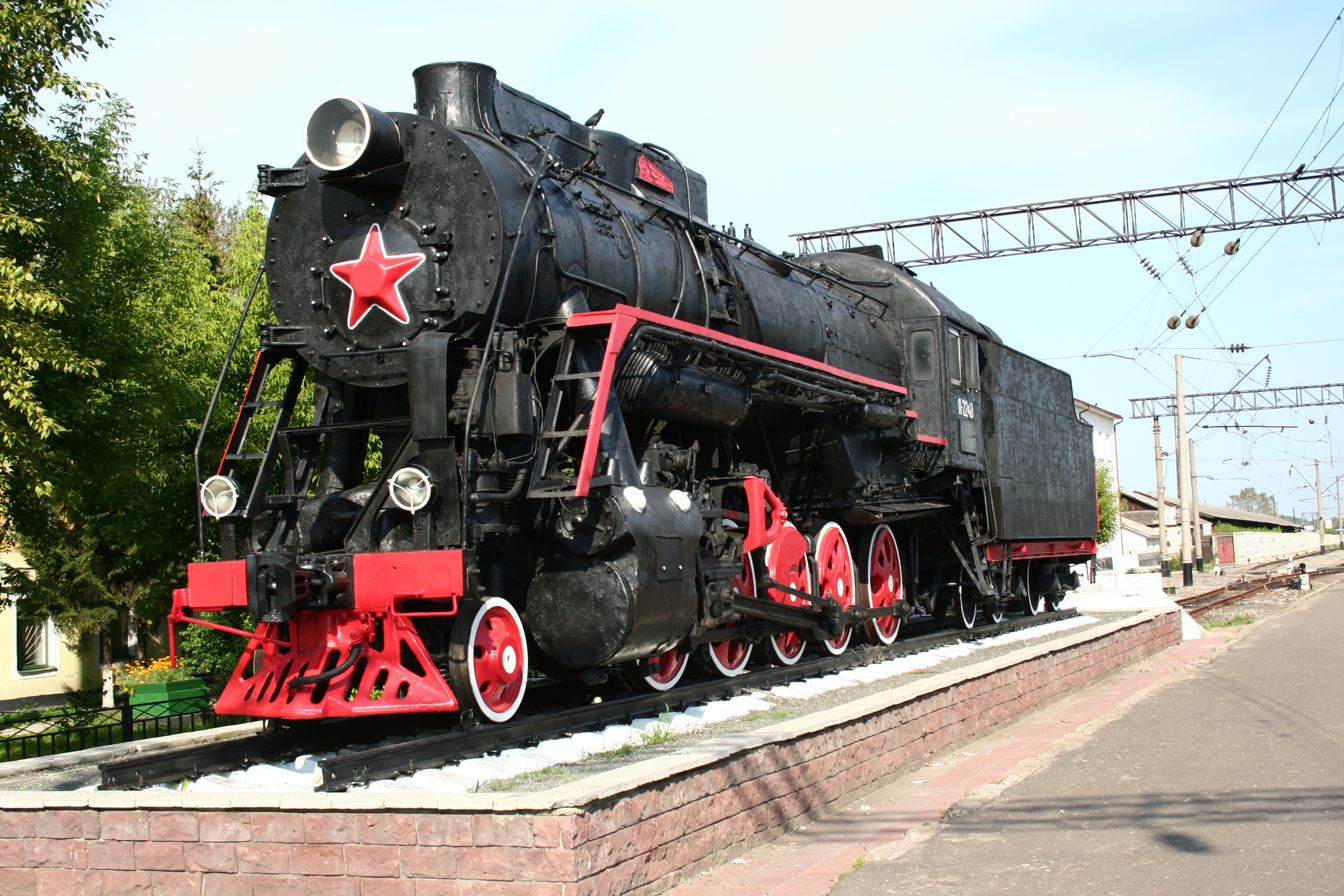
Steam locomotive type L in Murom

== Overview ==
The Murom Railway, 107 km, was opened officially on January 1, 1880, and operated from the beginning by the Nizhnyi Novgorod Railway with 13 locomotives, of which eight (class V) were built at state owned Votkin Works in 1877 - 1878, located at Votkinsk. The five class B locomotives were built by Schwartzkopff Werke (formerly L.Schwartzkopff) in Berlin, Germany in 1878. The ten kilometre extension was built in 1885, when the line was taken over by the state. The Murom Railway connected Nizhnyi Novgorod railway with private Moscow - Kazan Railway making both Murom and Kovrov, important railway junctions. After its construction, up to 80% of goods from Kovrov were bound for the Nizhny Novgorod Fair through the Moscow-Nizhny Novgorod Railway. The Murom Railway was merged into the Moscow - Kursk and Nizhnyi Novgorod Railway complex in 1893.

== Traffic ==
The Murom Railway favored trade growth and Moscow's bread supply and provided metal and forest for Central Russia. In the early 20th century, Murom received cement, yarn, and manufactured goods.

== Rolling stock ==
The rolling stock of the Murom Railway included thirteen steam locomotives (eight of them from the Votkin Factory, the other five from a German company named Schwartzkopff) and 300 cars. Rolling stock maintenance and repairs were done at railway repair shops at the Murom railway station. Also, they built a three small locomotive depots and car sheds in Kovrov, Selivanovo, and Murom.

== Track replacement ==
In 1872-1882, the Murom Railway was owned by a joint stock company. In 1888, they began a complete replacement of iron rails with the Russian-made steel rails made in nearby located Kulebak Iron Works.

== Merger and nationalization ==
In 1895, the Murom Railway was merged with the Moscow-Nizhny Novgorod and Moscow-Kursk Railways. In May 1918, all of the Russian railways were nationalized and transferred under the authority of the People's Commissariat for Communications (Народный Комиссариат Путей Сообщения).
