= Moscow–Kazan Railway =

Railway line in Russia

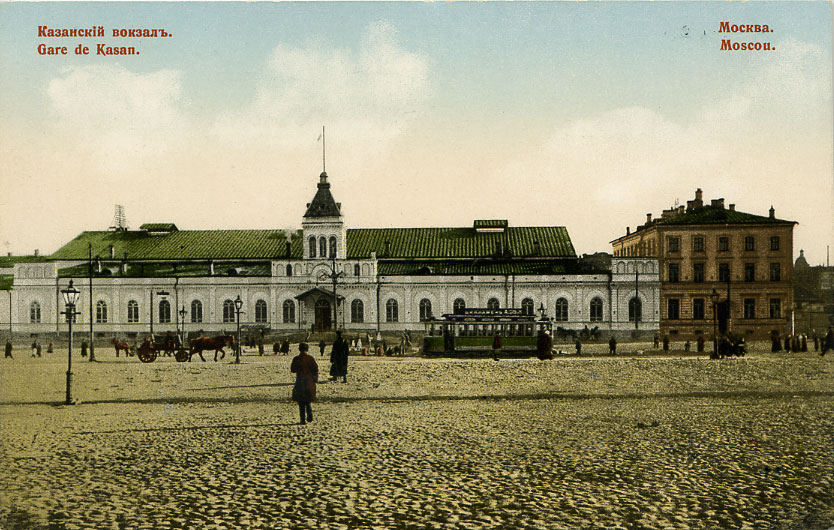
The main terminal of the railway, Moscow Kazanskaya railway station in 1913

The Moscow-Kazan railway was opened in 1893.

In 1890 the Moscow-Kazan Railway Association was established after negotiations with the government. In 1891 Nikolai von Meck, the son of Karl Otto Georg von Meck was appointed with the patronage of Grand Duchess Elizabeth Feodorovna. Nikolai's father had played an important role in running the Moscow-Ryazan Railway Association

In 1936 the People's Commissariat of Railways created the Moscow-Kazan railway as a separate organisation.

In 1961 the line was merged into the Gorky Railway.
