= Selivanovo, Kichmengsko-Gorodetsky District, Vologda Oblast =

Selivanovo Селиваново
- Village
- Location within Vologda Oblast Location within Russia
- Coordinates: 60°12′N 45°05′E
- Country: Russia
- Region: Vologda Oblast
- District: Kichmengsko-Gorodetsky District
- Time zone: UTC+3:00

Selivanovo (Russian: Селиваново) is a rural locality (a village) in Gorodetskoye Rural Settlement, Kichmengsko-Gorodetsky District, Vologda Oblast, Russia. The population was 27 as of 2002.

== Geography ==
Selivanovo is located 58 km northwest of Kichmengsky Gorodok (the district's administrative centre) by road. Kryazh is the nearest rural locality.
