= Murom, Belgorod Oblast =

Murom Муром
- Selo
- Location within Belgorod Oblast Location within Russia
- Coordinates: 50°18′N 36°42′E
- Country: Russia
- Region: Belgorod Oblast
- District: Shebekinsky District
- Time zone: UTC+3:00

Murom (Russian: Му́ром) is a rural locality (a selo) and the administrative center of Muromskoye Rural Settlement, Shebekinsky District, Belgorod Oblast, Russia. The population was 1,468 as of 2010. There are 24 streets.

== Geography ==
Murom is located 24 km southwest of Shebekino (the district's administrative centre) by road. Arkhangelskoye is the nearest rural locality.
