= Selivanovo, Cherepovetsky District, Vologda Oblast =

Selivanovo Селиваново
- Village
- Location within Vologda Oblast Location within Russia
- Coordinates: 59°18′N 38°01′E
- Country: Russia
- Region: Vologda Oblast
- District: Cherepovetsky District
- Time zone: UTC+3:00

Selivanovo (Russian: Селиваново) is a rural locality (a village) in Yargomzhskoye Rural Settlement, Cherepovetsky District, Vologda Oblast, Russia. The population was 4 as of 2002.

== Geography ==
Selivanovo is located 28 km north of Cherepovets (the district's administrative centre) by road. Yenyukovo is the nearest rural locality.
