= Selivanovo, Nikolsky District, Vologda Oblast =

Selivanovo Селиваново
- Village
- Location within Vologda Oblast Location within Russia
- Coordinates: 59°36′N 45°28′E
- Country: Russia
- Region: Vologda Oblast
- District: Nikolsky District
- Time zone: UTC+3:00

Selivanovo (Russian: Селиваново) is a rural locality (a village) in Krasnopolyanskoye Rural Settlement, Nikolsky District, Vologda Oblast, Russia. The population was 2 as of 2002.

== Geography ==
Selivanovo is located 12 km northeast of Nikolsk (the district's administrative centre) by road. Gora is the nearest rural locality.
