= Selivanovo, Belgorod Oblast =

Selivanovo Селиваново
- Selo
- Location within Belgorod Oblast Location within Russia
- Coordinates: 50°18′N 38°09′E
- Country: Russia
- Region: Belgorod Oblast
- District: Valuysky District
- Time zone: UTC+3:00

Selivanovo (Russian: Селиваново) is a rural locality (a selo) in Valuysky District, Belgorod Oblast, Russia. The population was 421 as of 2010. There are 3 streets.

== Geography ==
Selivanovo is located 22 km northeast of Valuyki (the district's administrative centre) by road. Mayskoye is the nearest rural locality.
