= Jacek Salij =

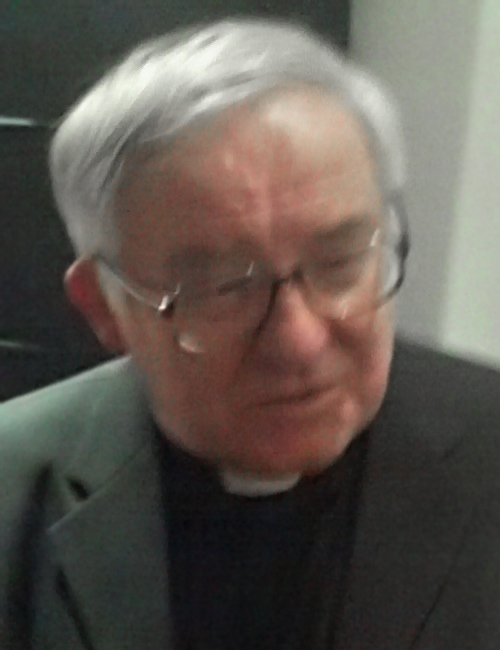
- Jacek Salij (2007)
- Born: 19 August 1942 (age 83); Budy, Wołyń
- Education: M.A. in theology in 1967, PhD in law in 1971, Habilitation in 1979
- Church: Roman Catholic
- Offices held: Ordinary professor and Director of the Chair of Dogmatic Theology at the University of Cardinal Stefan Wyszynski

Jacek Salij OP (born 19 August 1942, Budy, Wołyń) is a Polish theologian and Thomist, philosopher, Roman Catholic priest, Dominican, translator, writer and publicist.

== Biography ==
During the years 1960-1967 he studied theology at The Dominican Philosophical-Theological College in Cracow, followed by studies during the years 1968–1970 at The Academy of Catholic Theology in Warsaw. In 1971, he obtained the title Doctor of Law and obtained a post-doctorate diploma (Habilitation) in 1979. In 1984, he worked at The Catholic University of Leuven (Belgium). In 1990, he was appointed extraordinary professor of The Academy of Catholic Theology, Warsaw and in 1992 became an ordinary professor of this institution.

At present, he is Director of the Chair of Dogmatic Theology at the University of Cardinal Stefan Wyszynski (UKSW, formerly the Academy of Catholic Theology in Warsaw) and Consultant to the Section of Theological Studies in the Polish episcopate's Commission for the Teaching of the Faith. He lectures in dogmatic theology at the UKSW and at the Dominican Philosophical-Theological College in the Służew district of Warsaw.

He is a member of the Committee for Theological Studies of PAN and of the Polish section of the PEN Club.

The chief areas of his scientific interests are: history of dogmas, dogmatic theology, theology of God, philosophy of St. Thomas and scholasticism, ethics and bioethics. He is the author of many books, scientific dissertations and translations.

He contributes regularly to the monthly "W drodze" ("On the Way"), where for the last 30 years, he has been running a column entitled "For Those Seeking the Way", in which he replies to various questions posed by the readers. This popular presentation of the Faith has become the basis for the publication of many of his books that give answers to relevant contemporary questions.

== Awards ==
In 2004, during the 10th Fair for Catholic Publishers, he obtained the FENIKS 2004 award "for the tireless popularisation of theological knowledge in Poland in various publications”

On the 3 of May 2007, The President of the Republic of Poland, Lech Kaczyński, awarded Fr Jacek Salij with the Commander's Cross with Star of Order of Poland Reborn.
