= Gorky Railway =

Transport company in Russia

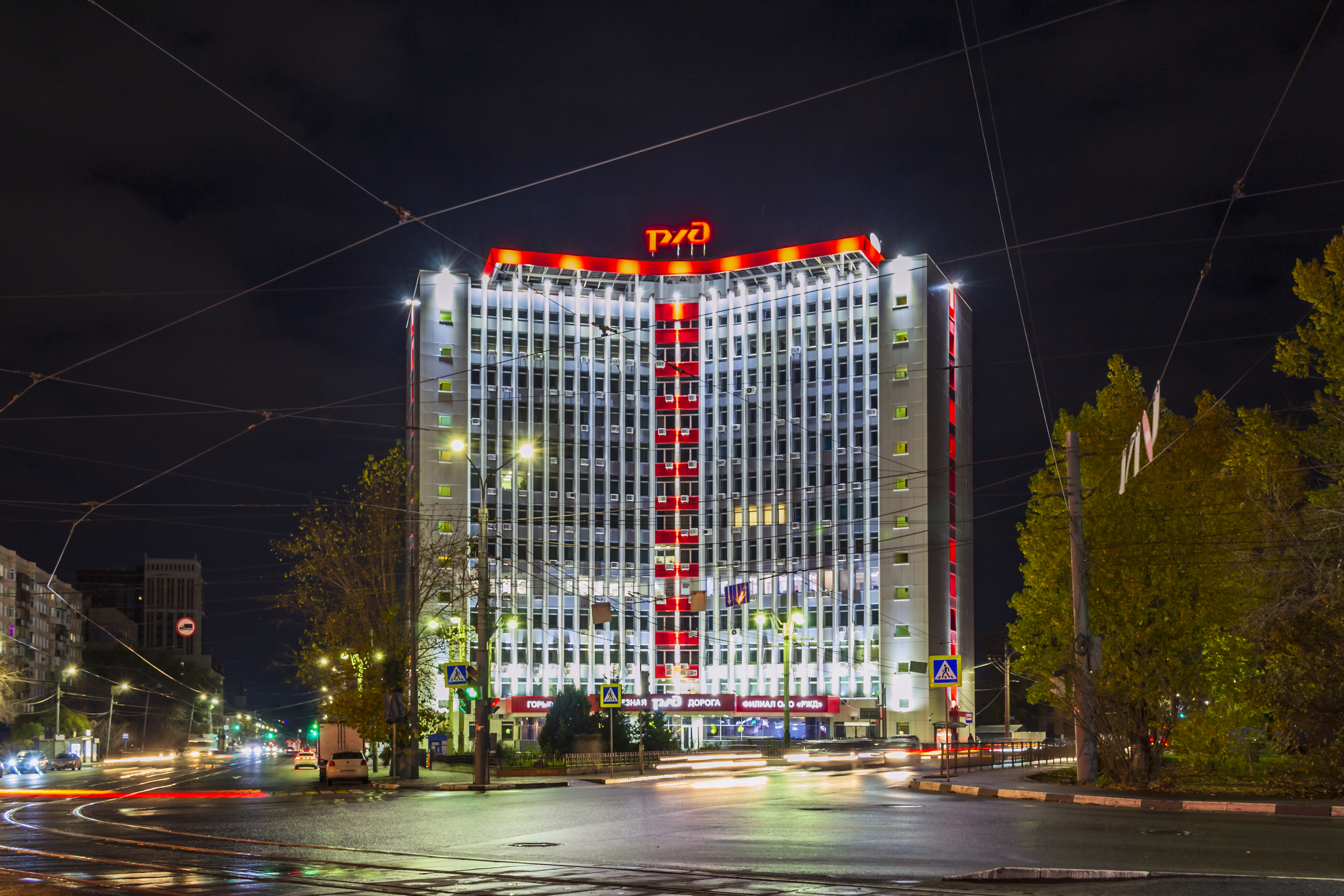
- Gorky Railway Administration Building

Overview
- Parent company: Russian Railways
- Headquarters: 78, October Revolution street, Nizhny Novgorod, Russia
- Dates of operation: 1862–
- Predecessor: Moscow-Nizhny Novgorod railway

Technical
- Electrification: 1957
- Length: 5296 km

Other
- Website: gzd.rzd.ru

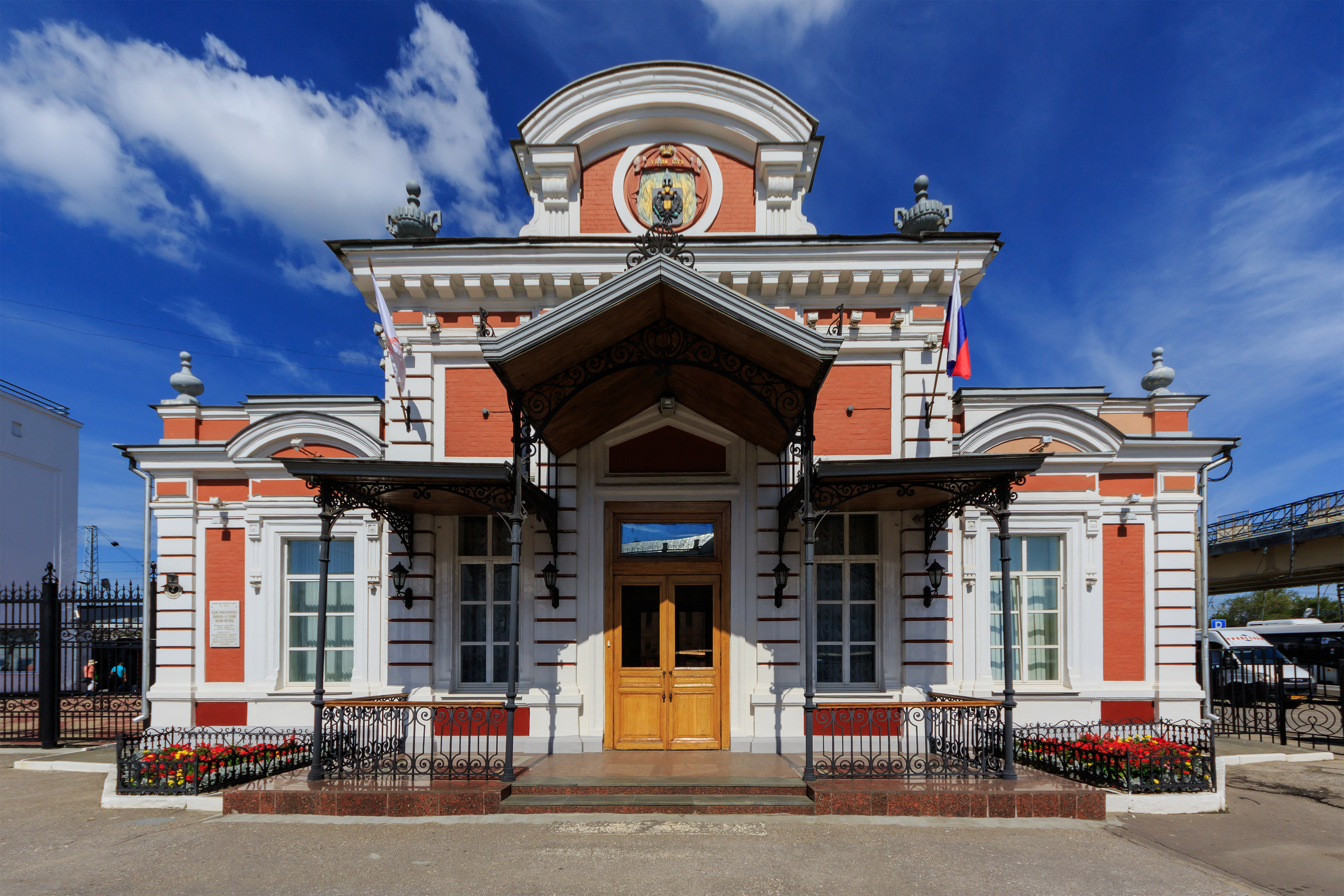
Pavilion for the members of the Romanov royal family at the Nizhny Novgorod railway station

The Gorky Railway (Горьковская железная дорога) is a subsidiary of the Russian Railways headquartered in Nizhny Novgorod (formerly known as Gorky, hence the name).

The railway network serves nine federal subjects of the Russian Federation: Nizhny Novgorod Oblast, Vladimir Oblast, Kirov Oblast, Ryazan Oblast, Mordovia, Chuvashia, Udmurtia, Tatarstan, and Mari El. Its railway route length approximates 7987 km.

Construction of the mainline from Moscow through Vladimir to Nizhny Novgorod started in May 1858 and was completed within four years. This private enterprise was acquired by the imperial government in 1893. The Murom Railway was opened in 1880. The private Moscow-Kazan Railway was completed in 1912; it was nationalized by the Bolsheviks six years later.

The Gorky Railway was created as a separate organisation in 1936. The Moscow-Kazan Railway was also organised as a separate organisation at this time

The existing railway company traces its history from 1961. The Moscow-Kazan Railway was merged into the new organisation at this point. It was awarded the Order of the Red Banner of Labour in 1971. In 2010, the Gorky Railway became the third subdivision of the Russian Railways operating a high speed train (see Sapsan).

The Gorky railway also operated a 750 mm (2 ft 5 1/2 in) Tumskaja–Golowanowa Datscha railway line, closed in 2008.

== Divisions ==
- Gorky Railway Division
- Izhevsk Railway Division
- Kazan Railway Division
- Kirov Railway Division
- Murom Railway Division
