= Nadezhda von Meck =

Russian businesswoman (1831–1894)

Nadezhda Filaretovna von Meck
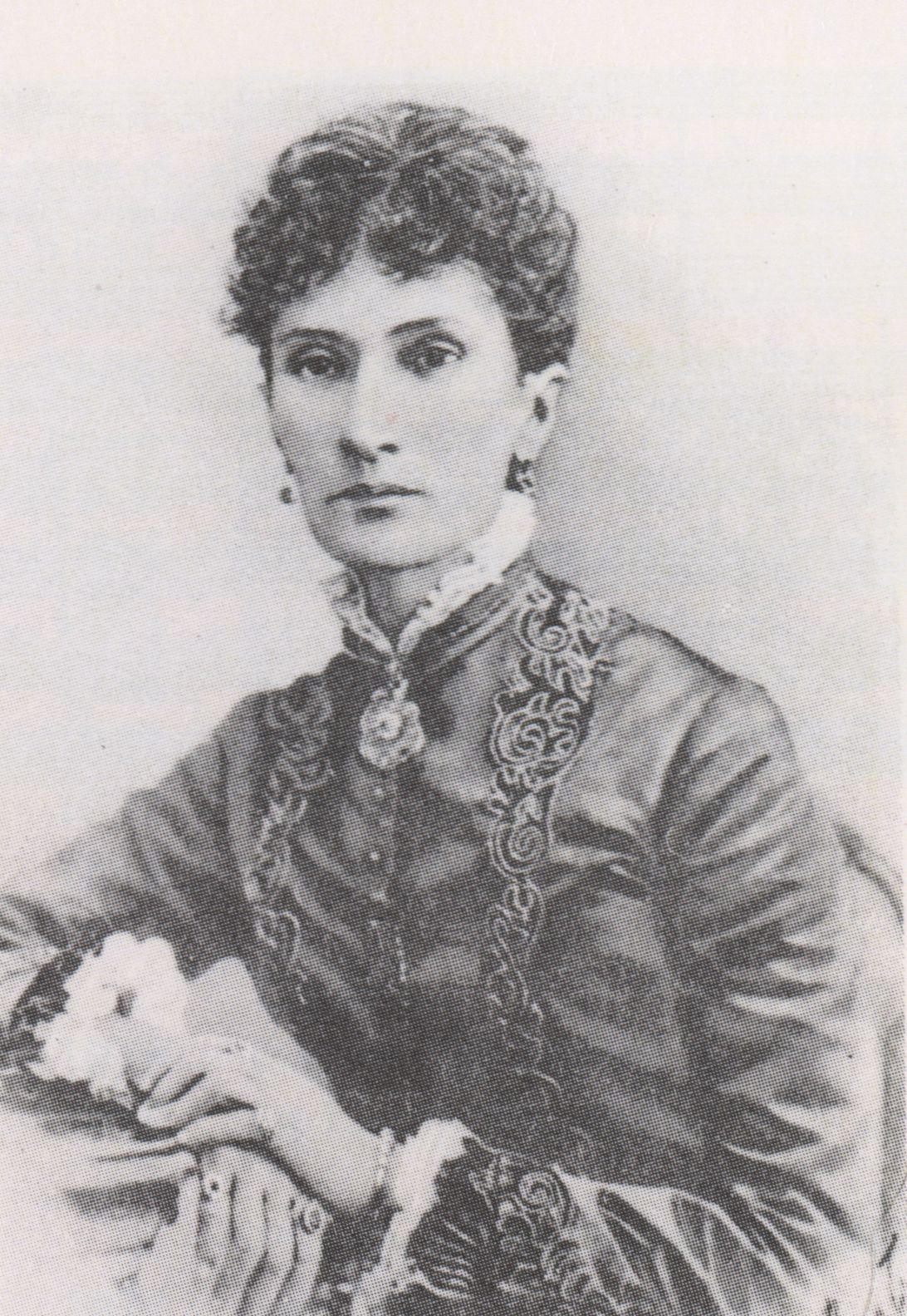
- Nadezhda von Meck
- Born: 10 February [O.S. 29 January] 1831; Znamenskoye, Smolensk Governorate, Russian Empire
- Died: 13 January 1894 (aged 62); Nice, France
- Husband: Karl Otto Georg von Meck
- Issue: 13 children
- Father: Filaret Frolovsky
- Mother: Anastasia Dimitryevna Potemkina

Nadezhda Filaretovna von Meck (Russian: Надежда Филаретовна фон Мекк; 10 February [O.S. 29 January] 1831 – 13 January 1894) was a Russian businesswoman who became an influential patron of the arts, especially music. She is best known today for her artistic relationship with Pyotr Ilyich Tchaikovsky, supporting him financially for thirteen years, so that he could devote himself full-time to composition, while stipulating that they were never to meet. Tchaikovsky dedicated his Symphony No. 4 in F minor to her. She also gave financial support to several other musicians, including Nikolai Rubinstein and Claude Debussy.

== Life ==
=== Childhood ===
Nadezhda von Meck was born Nadezhda Filaretovna Frolovskaya, in a family which owned large landed estates. Her father, Filaret Frolovsky, embraced her love of music from an early age, while from her mother, Anastasia Dimitryevna Potemkina, she learned energy, determination, and business acumen.

A serious student of music in her youth, Nadezhda became a capable pianist with a good knowledge of the classical repertoire. She also mastered some foreign languages, learned to appreciate the visual arts, and read widely in literature, history, and philosophy, especially the work of Arthur Schopenhauer and the Russian idealist Vladimir Solovyov.

=== Marriage ===
At seventeen, Nadezhda was married to Karl Otto Georg von Meck, a 27-year-old engineer and the son of Major Otto Adam von Meck by his marriage to Wilhelmine Hafferberg – Baltic Germans from Riga. Together they had thirteen children, of whom eleven survived to adulthood.

As a government official, Karl von Meck's life was uneventful, and his work was poorly paid. With several children quickly added to his responsibilities, however, he was reluctant to make a break with a steady post.

Nadezhda von Meck saw things very differently. To her, filling the roles of mother, nurse, governess, dressmaker, housekeeper, and valet was far easier to bear than the humiliation of seeing her husband as a cog in the machine of a government organization. Neither did fulfilling all those domestic duties lower her resolve or weaken her energy in urging him to make a break. Russia, desperately short of railways, was expanding its communications network rapidly, and Nadezhda saw that a future for her husband lay there. She continually exerted pressure on him to find a partner with capital and to join the boom in Russian railway construction.

Von Meck finally gave in to his wife's urgings and resigned from the civil service, at which point they had an income of only twenty kopecks a day on which to live. Nadezhda was right, though, to trust her husband's talent as an engineer. In 1860, there were only 100 miles of railroad track laid in Russia. Twenty years later, there were over 15,000 miles of lines. Much of this explosion was due to Karl von Meck, and his investments made him a multi-millionaire. The railway lines for which he was responsible included that from Kursk to Kiev and the highly profitable Moscow to Ryazan line, with its effective monopoly of grain transportation from the Black Earth Region of Central Russia.

In 1876, Karl von Meck died suddenly, leaving a will which gave Nadezhda control of his vast financial holdings. This included two railway networks, large landed estates, and several million rubles in investments. With seven of their eleven children still at home, von Meck concentrated on her business affairs and on the education of the children still dependent on her. She sold one of von Meck's railway companies and ran the other one with the help of her brother and her eldest son, Vladimir.

=== Withdrawal from society ===
After the death of her husband, von Meck took no part in social life, withdrawing into almost complete seclusion. She even refused to meet the relatives of those whom her children were going to marry, and she never attended any of their weddings.

By all accounts, von Meck was imperious by nature, presiding over her household despotically. She expected to have her own way, so surrounded herself only with people who would give it to her, and she ruled her children's lives in every detail. As they grew into adulthood, she arranged their marriages, bought houses for them, and even chose furniture for their houses. When she wanted to see her married children, she summoned rather than invited them. Understandably, her children were not always grateful for the extreme degree of their mother's care (or meddling, depending on the viewpoint of the person concerned).

Von Meck was always compulsively busy. She took her more senior servants on periodic inspection tours of her house from cellar to roof, and the house never remained quite the same after such tours. String was saved for her to untangle and wind. Books were bought so that she might cut the pages. She purchased quantities of wool, which she then wound into balls and sent to her daughter, Countess Bennigsen. While engaging in this business, she would summon her daughter Julia to come and read to her. Julia did not mind. Of all the von Meck children, she was the one most eager to please her mother, who demanded everything from her—and got it.

Von Meck was probably well aware that she was hard to tolerate. She wrote to Tchaikovsky,

I am very unsympathetic in my personal relations because I do not possess any femininity whatever; second, I do not know how to be tender, and this characteristic has passed on to my entire family. All of us are afraid to be affected or sentimental, and therefore the general nature of our family relationships is comradely, or masculine, so to speak.

=== Personal views ===
Von Meck was a professed atheist, which was not unusual in aristocratic Russia in the 1870s. Her fierce need for independence, on the other hand, was very unusual for a woman of the time. Her division between that and concern for her family resulted in contradictions between her beliefs and actions. Her views on affairs of the heart were strictly moral, but she did not believe in marriage as a social institution and regularly professed her hatred of it to Tchaikovsky. "You may think, my dear Pyotr Ilyich, that I am a great admirer of marriage," she wrote on 31 March 1878, "but in order that you not be mistaken in anything referring to myself, I shall tell you that I am, on the contrary, an irreconcilable enemy of marriages, yet when I discuss another person's situation, I consider it necessary to do so from his point of view." On another occasion, she stated more genially but no less forcefully, "The distribution of rights and obligations as determined by social laws I find speculative and immoral."

Even with her views on matrimony, von Meck was resigned to it as a means of social stability and procreation, and her own marital experience may have forced her to recognize its benefits. This realization may have also been why she strove to marry off her children as soon as possible—to ensure their stability in the event of her demise. Even in marriage, though, she considered sexual relations between men and women to be mutual exploitation. Russian radical thinkers of the period, such as Nikolay Chernyshevsky and Dmitry Pisarev, espoused views not far removed from hers. Both men considered marriage to be a pillar of bourgeois society and called for its abolition. Von Meck especially respected Pisarev's work, as well as 19th-century positivism in general.

== Support of the performing arts ==
Nikolai Rubinstein

With her great wealth and her passion for music, von Meck became a major mover in the Russian performing arts. The sole exception to her general reclusiveness was the series of Russian Musical Society concerts given in Moscow, which she attended incognito, sitting alone in the balcony. Through these concerts she made the acquaintance of Nikolai Rubinstein, with whom she maintained a complex relationship. While she respected Rubinstein's talents and energy, that did not stop her from disagreeing strongly with him at times.

While her husband was still alive, von Meck began actively supporting and promoting young musicians, several of whom she continually employed, living in her household and playing her favorite works. She hired Claude Debussy as a music tutor for her daughters, and he wanted to marry one of them. She would not give her permission, preferring her daughters to marry men of her own choosing.

In February 1880, von Meck came to the assistance of the Polish violinist Henryk Wieniawski, who had been taken ill in Odessa while on a concert tour. She moved him into her house and arranged medical treatment for him, but he died a few weeks later in Moscow.

== Relationship with Tchaikovsky ==
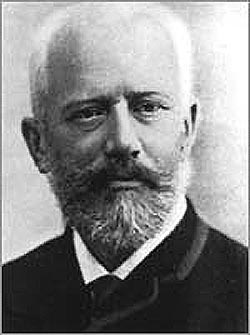
Pyotr Ilyich Tchaikovsky

In 1877, one of the musicians she supported was violinist Iosif Kotek, with whom she played chamber music. Kotek was a former student and friend of Pyotr Ilyich Tchaikovsky, recommended to von Meck by Nikolai Rubinstein. She had already been impressed with Tchaikovsky's music such as his symphonic poem The Tempest, and she asked Rubinstein at length about him. She wrote to the composer. Introducing herself as a "fervent admirer", she commissioned some pieces for violin and piano to be played at her house. Tchaikovsky quickly obliged. One of her first commissions was for a funeral march, which was never published and is now considered lost.

They continued writing even as his marriage followed its brief though tortuous course. As their relationship developed, she subsequently provided him with an allowance of 6,000 rubles a year, large enough that he could leave his professorship at the Moscow Conservatory to focus on creative work full-time. This was a substantial income. A minor government official in those days had to support his family on 300–400 rubles a year.

Tchaikovsky was grateful for von Meck's financial support. Nevertheless, it created some emotional discomfort and an underlying tension, but they both eventually handled this awkwardness with considerable delicacy. Still, Tchaikovsky could not help feeling vaguely uncomfortable about the favors with which von Meck showered him. He wrote to her frankly about this: "... in my relations with you there is the ticklish circumstance that every time we write to one another, money appears on the scene."

=== Epistolary friendship ===
They carried on a significant correspondence, exchanging over 1,200 letters between 1877 and 1890. The details they shared were extraordinary for two people who never met. He was more open to her about much of his life and his creative processes than to any other person. Her feedback became so important to him that, after the critics lambasted his Fifth Symphony, she provided him with the support to persevere with his composing. Von Meck died believing these letters had all been destroyed. However, when Tchaikovsky received her request to do so, he assured her that he had destroyed them, but then filed that letter with all the rest for posterity to find.

Von Meck remained a devoted supporter of Tchaikovsky and all his works, but her bond with him depended on not meeting him. This was not simply because he would not live up to her expectations. She desired to think of Tchaikovsky as her ideal of a composer-cum-philosopher, much like the Übermensch or Superman about whom Friedrich Nietzsche would write. Tchaikovsky understood this, writing to von Meck, "You are quite right, Nadezhda Filaretovna, to suppose that I am of a disposition sympathetic to your own unusual spiritual feelings, which I understand completely."

The two did meet on one occasion, purely by chance, in August 1879, while Tchaikovsky was staying at the von Meck estate at Simaki. He had gone for his daily walk in the forest somewhat earlier than usual, unaware that she was late for her daily drive through that same area with the rest of her family. As a result, they came face to face for a few moments; he tipped his hat politely, she was nonplussed, but no words were spoken. He wrote to her the same evening to apologise for the inadvertent breach of their arrangement. She responded, saying there was nothing to apologise for, and she even invited him to visit her home to see her new paintings, but at a time when she would be away.

The previous year, while staying at her villa in Florence, Tchaikovsky had seen her and her entourage pass by every morning; and they also glimpsed each other once at the opera, but only from a distance. Alexander Poznansky says of this last encounter: "It is not clear whether their both being at the theater was wholly accidental or arranged by Mrs. von Meck in order to see him, as seems not unlikely."

=== Dedication of Fourth Symphony ===
Tchaikovsky, as a sign of appreciation, dedicated his Symphony No. 4 to her. This was important because, due to the nature of artistic patronage in Russian society, patron and artist were considered equals. Dedications of works to patrons were expressions of artistic partnership. By dedicating the Fourth Symphony to von Meck, he was affirming her as an equal partner in its creation.

=== Symbolic—and strained—union ===
Anna von Meck, Tchaikovsky's niece, with her husband Nikolai

In 1883, von Meck's son Nikolai married Tchaikovsky's niece Anna Davydova, after five years of matchmaking efforts by von Meck and Tchaikovsky. Von Meck, who was in Cannes at the time, did not attend the wedding, thus staying true to her custom of avoiding all contact with the families of her children's spouses. However, Tchaikovsky did attend, meeting the rest of the von Meck clan.

At first both von Meck and Tchaikovsky rejoiced in this event, seeing in it a symbolic consummation of their own relationship, but later events would make them question their intentions. Anna, extremely strong-willed herself, dominated her husband. She also opposed her mother-in-law regarding family matters—most tellingly in a feud between her eldest son and business partner, Vladimir, and the rest of the family. Rather than bringing von Meck and Tchaikovsky closer together, Anna and Nikolai's union may have helped drive a wedge between them. Tchaikovsky virtually disowned his niece in an effort to avert a falling-out, while von Meck hid from him her true feelings about what was taking place.

=== The break ===
In October 1890, von Meck sent Tchaikovsky a year's allowance in advance, along with a letter ending her patronage. She claimed bankruptcy. Most surprising about the break was its extreme suddenness. Barely a week beforehand, she had sent him a typically intimate, loving and confessional letter. The letter dealt in large part with how her children were squandering their future inheritance.

This was a persistent irritation for von Meck and not necessarily a reason for her ending patronage of Tchaikovsky. Nevertheless, one logical explanation of giving him a year's allowance at once would be that she feared not having the funds to send later, in their usual arrangement of monthly installments. Others discount this idea. Most tellingly, von Meck asked Tchaikovsky, in her final letter, not to forget her.

Two facts contributed to von Meck's decision to make the break:

1. By 1890, she was gravely ill. She was in the latter stages of tuberculosis and would succumb two months after Tchaikovsky's death. An atrophy of her arm made writing nearly impossible. Dictating letters via a third party would have been awkward—especially messages as frank, informal and personal as the ones she and Tchaikovsky had exchanged.
2. She was under intense family pressure to end the relationship. Her children were embarrassed by her closeness with Tchaikovsky. There was society gossip about the composer and "La Meck". Increasingly, at least in the eyes of hostile relatives, the situation seemed scandalous. Worse, to them, he continued to take von Meck's money freely even after he had received a generous pension from Tsar Alexander III. As the children's own financial situations worsened, they grew more resolved to end the arrangement between their mother and Tchaikovsky. By mid- to late 1890, over a two-month period, she had been visited by all but one of her elder children and may even have been given a final ultimatum. The final letter and payment from von Meck to Tchaikovsky were delivered by a trusted servant of hers, Ivan Vasilyev, for whom he held warm feelings. She had never sent anything to him this way before and had always sent letters and checks by post.

Von Meck also knew that Tchaikovsky was often in need of cash, despite the large sums she gave him. Tchaikovsky was a poor manager of money and would ask her for the next year's allowance several months in advance. Knowing of this habit, she might have anticipated his needing the money.

=== Brotherly jealousy ===
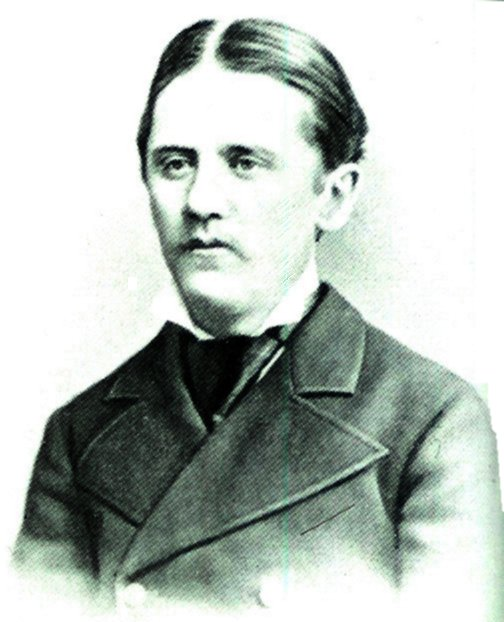
Modest Tchaikovsky

One person who may have welcomed the break was Tchaikovsky's brother Modest. When the two brothers discussed von Meck's action, Modest did not try to explain her behaviour. Instead, he stated his opinion that what had been to Tchaikovsky the unique and mutual relationship of two friends had been for von Meck merely the passing fancy of a wealthy woman.

=== Possible reconciliation ===
Galina von Meck—daughter of Nadezhda von Meck's son Nikolay and Tchaikovsky's niece Anna—maintained that the rift was secretly healed. In September 1893, only weeks before Tchaikovsky's death, Anna was about to leave for Nice, where Nadezhda von Meck was dying, and Anna was travelling there to nurse her. Tchaikovsky asked her to beg his former friend for forgiveness for his own silence. This apology was reportedly accepted wholeheartedly by von Meck and reciprocated. The Tchaikovsky biographer David Brown maintains that Galina's account "contains much hearsay and a good deal that is romantically heightened." Regardless of this, he concedes some plausibility in her account, especially since Galina received the story directly from her mother.

== Financial problems ==
Von Meck's claim of bankruptcy was not entirely untrue. Along with his fortune, Karl von Meck had left a sizable amount of debt upon his death, and this debt proved to be far more extensive than his wife had previously known. Rumours of this debt started circulating publicly in the early 1880s. Tchaikovsky had questioned her about it in his letters.

The problem of the debts was compounded by the financial mismanagement of Nadezhda von Meck's business affairs by her son Vladimir. While he was as gifted in public relations as his father had been in engineering, Vladimir proved as extravagant as his mother in spending. He was the favorite among the von Meck children, which may have been why his mother tolerated his ways as long as she did. Unfortunately, it was also largely what pitted her and Vladimir against his siblings and sister-in-law, Anna (Tchaikovsky's niece). They claimed, among other things, that he was pocketing company funds for his own use. Regardless of the truth of these charges, the von Meck estate was in serious financial peril.

In 1890, Vladimir von Meck suffered a nervous breakdown, and that summer his mother relieved him of his position. His replacement was his mother's personal assistant Władysław Pachulski. Originally employed as a musician, Pachulski became a member of the family by marrying Julia von Meck. He was also far more experienced in financial management than Vladimir had been, and was able to save the von Meck estates from bankruptcy. Meanwhile, Vladimir was found to have an advanced case of tuberculosis, the same disease from which his mother suffered, and he would die from it in 1892.

== Death ==
Von Meck died from tuberculosis on January 13, 1894 in Nice, in the south of France, two months after Tchaikovsky's death.

After her mother-in-law's death, Anna von Meck was asked how the late patroness had endured Tchaikovsky's death. She replied, "She did not endure it."

== Donation by Galina Nikolayevna von Meck ==
In 1985 Galina von Meck donated to Columbia University a collection including her translation of 681 letters written by Tchaikovsky to his family. The collection covered the period from March 1861 to September 1893.
