= Nikolai Rubinstein =

Russian pianist, conductor and composer (1835–1881)

- Николай Рубинштейн
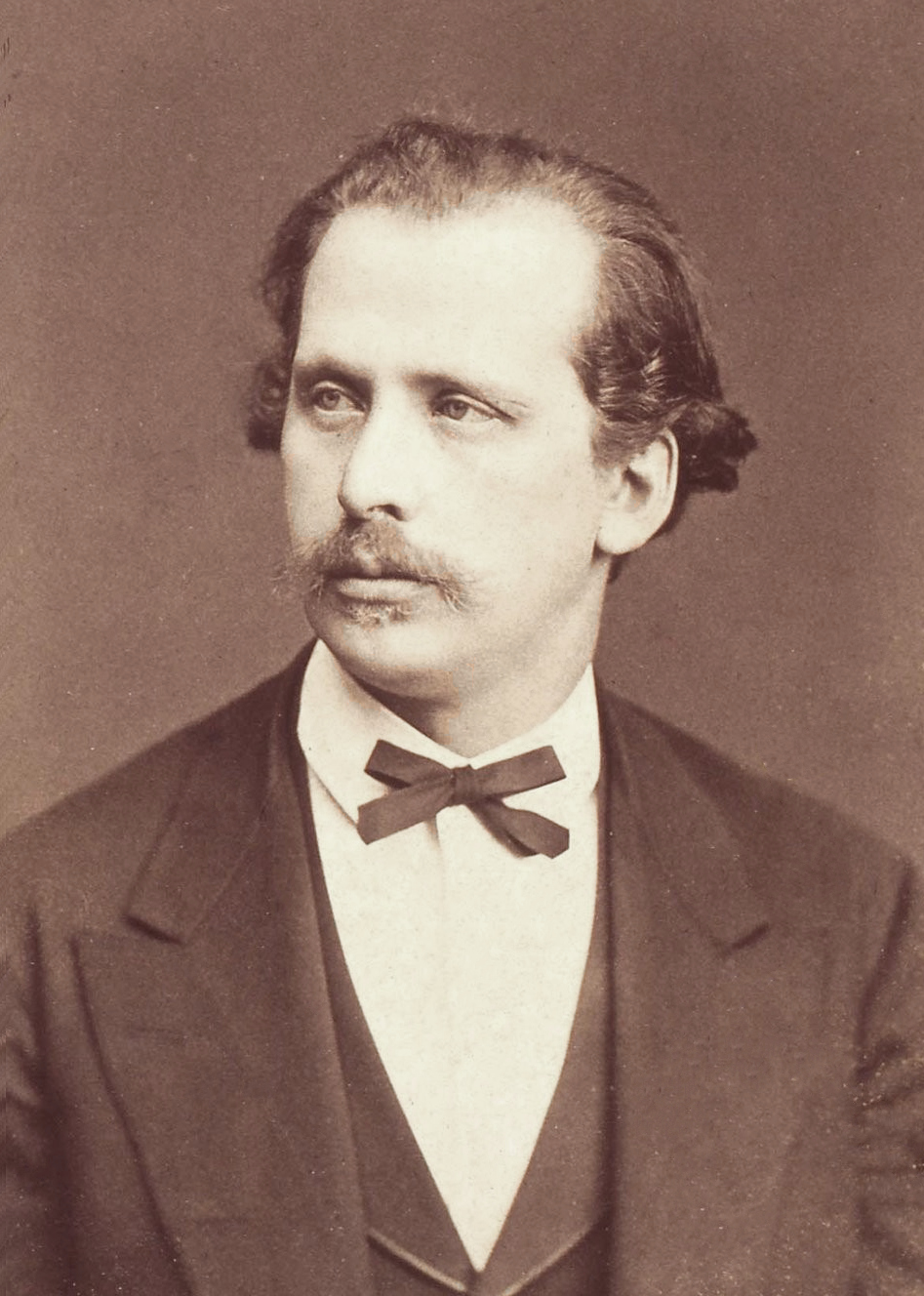
- Rubinstein in 1872
- Born: 14 June [O.S. 2 June] 1835; Moscow, Russia
- Died: 23 March [O.S. 11 March] 1881 (aged 45); Paris, France
- Resting place: Novodevichy Cemetery
- Occupations: Pianist; conductor; composer
- Known for: Founder of the Moscow Conservatory (1859)

Nikolai Grigoryevich Rubinstein (Russian: Никола́й Григо́рьевич Рубинште́йн; 14 June [O.S. 2 June] 1835 – 23 March [O.S. 11 March] 1881) was a Russian pianist, conductor, and composer. He was the younger brother of Anton Rubinstein and a close friend of Pyotr Ilyich Tchaikovsky.

== Life ==
Born to Jewish parents in Moscow, where his father had just opened a small factory, Rubinstein showed talent at the keyboard early on. He studied piano first with his mother, and while the family was in Berlin between 1844 and 1846, he studied piano with Theodor Kullak and harmony and counterpoint with Siegfried Dehn; during this time both he and his brother Anton attracted the interest and support of Mendelssohn and Meyerbeer. When the family returned to Moscow, Nikolai studied with Alexander Villoing, who also toured with him. He studied medicine to avoid army conscription, graduating from Moscow University in 1855.

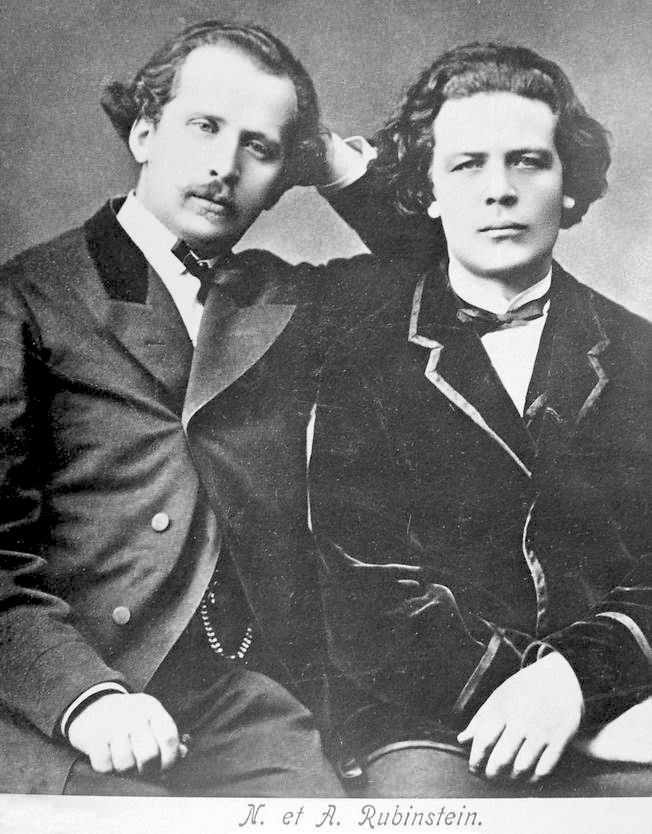
Brothers Rubinstein: Nikolai (left) and Anton, 1862

As a result of his playing, Rubinstein was welcomed in all the fashionable artistocratic houses in Moscow. He co-founded the Moscow branch of the Russian Musical Society in 1859 and the Moscow Conservatory in 1866 with Prince Nikolai Petrovitch Troubetzkoy, serving as director of the latter until his death in 1881. He hired Tchaikovsky, then newly graduated from the Saint Petersburg Conservatory, to teach harmony at Moscow Conservatory. He actively encouraged Tchaikovsky's creative efforts and performed his compositions. Rubinstein and Tchaikovsky had a well-known falling-out over the latter's First Piano Concerto, but Rubinstein later revised his position and became an ardent champion of the work. Rubinstein conducted the premiere of Tchaikovsky's opera Eugene Onegin in 1879. Tchaikovsky wrote his Piano Trio in A minor in Rubinstein's memory after he died from tuberculosis in Paris.

Rubinstein also conducted and performed music of the nationalistic music group "The Five" to a much greater degree than his brother. In 1869, when the group's leader, Mily Balakirev, was forced to resign as conductor of the St. Petersburg branch of the Russian Musical Society, Rubinstein gave Balakirev his support, playing at concerts of the Free Music School as Balakirev's guest. He also gave the first performance of Balakirev's piano work Islamey, the work for which he is best known today.

== Pianism ==
Nikolai Rubinstein was generally regarded as one of the greatest pianists of his time, although now his reputation is overshadowed by that of his brother Anton. His pianistic style was quite at odds with that of his fiery brother. He instead opted for a restrained classicism more in line with the musical values of Clara Schumann than Franz Liszt. Edward Garden writes in the New Grove (2001), "His performances emphasized salient details of the structure of a piece and revealed great clarity of detail."

According to Harold C. Schonberg, Anton Rubinstein is reported to have said that "if Nikolai had really worked on it, he could have been the better pianist of the two." One of Nikolai's pupils, Emil von Sauer, wrote a comparison of the two brothers' playing styles in 1895:

It is difficult to say which was the better pianist. In every way as different as the brothers were in personal appearance—the one dark, almost to blackness; the other very fair — so different was their playing. The playing of Nicholas was more like that of Tausig, only warmer and more impulsive. Perhaps Anton Rubinstein was the more inspired player of the two, but he was unequal. Nicholas never varied; his playing both in private and in public was always the same, and he kept up the same standard of excellence.

== Students ==
Nikolai Rubinstein's best-known piano students were Sergei Taneyev, Emil von Sauer and Alexander Siloti. Sauer and Siloti went on to study under Franz Liszt. His other notable pupils included Ina Lange, Ernst Jedliczka and Henryk Pachulski.

== As a composer ==
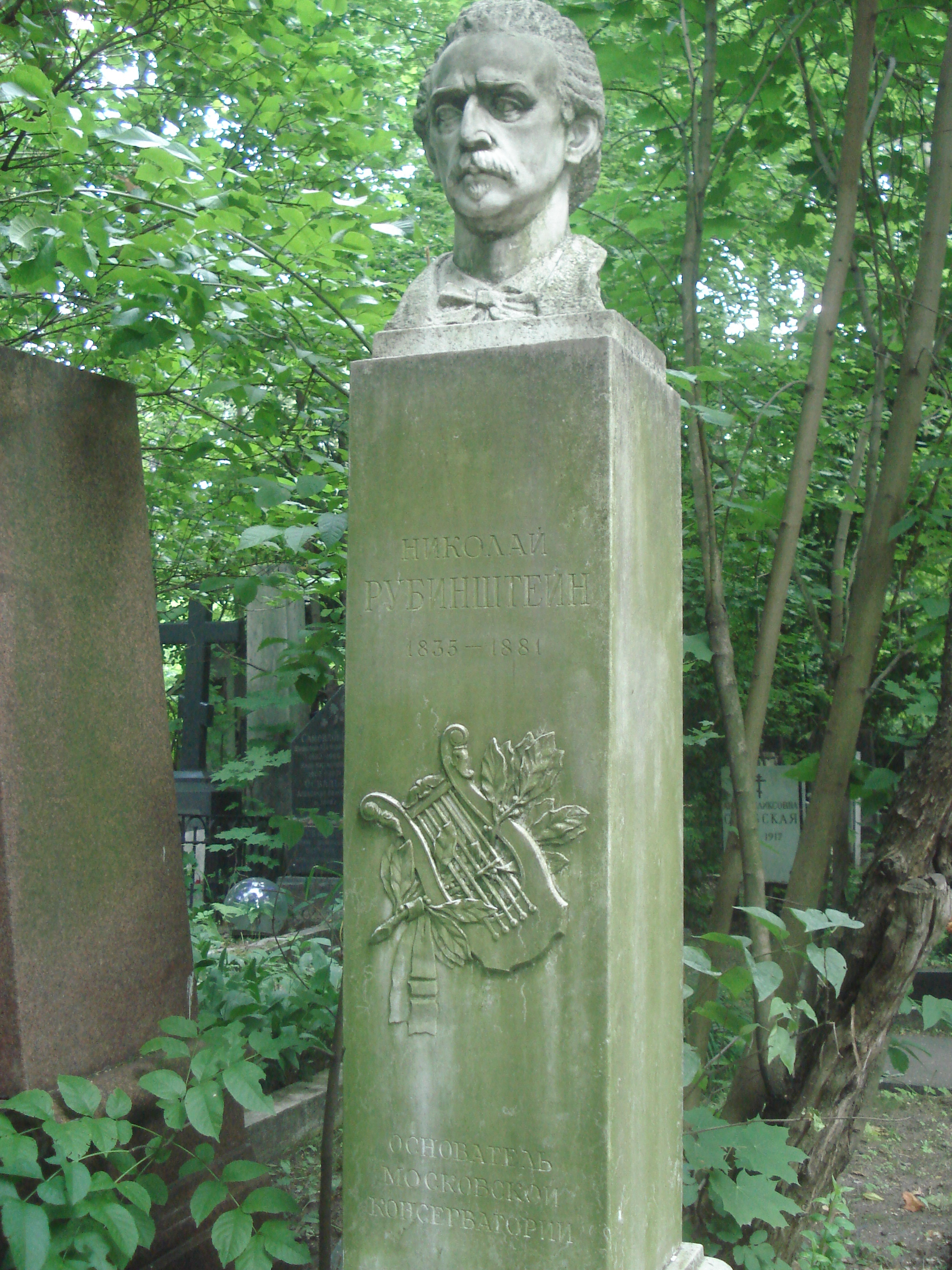
Grave of Nikolai Rubinstein in Novodevichy Cemetery, Moscow.

Rubinstein was also a composer of some note, though Garden dismisses his music as "unimportant. Among his most popular works is his Tarantella in G minor. When asked why he did not compose more than he did, he replied that his brother Anton "composed enough for three."

== Worklist (incomplete) ==
- Op. 11 – Two mazurkas
- Op. 13 – Bolero
- Op. 14 – Tarentelle in G minor (pub. 1861 for solo piano; pub. 1877 for piano duet; also arranged for 2 pianos)
- Op. 15 – Polka for piano in E♭ major
- Op. 16 – Valse in A♭ major (later arranged for 2 pianos)
- Op. 17 – Scene de Bal (later arranged for 2 pianos)
- WoO – Two Feuilles d'Album
