= String Quartet in A minor =

String Quartet in A minor may refer to:

- String Quartet No. 15 (Beethoven)
- String Quartet No. 13 (Schubert)
- String Quartet No. 2 (Mendelssohn)
- String Quartet No. 2 (Brahms)
- String Quartet No. 6 (Dvořák)
- String Quartet No. 7 (Dvořák)
- String Quartet No. 2 (Arensky)
- String Quartet No. 3 (Hill)
- String Quartet No. 1 (Bartók)
- String Quartet No. 2 (Bartók)
- String Quartet in A minor (Walton)
- String Quartet in A minor (Sibelius)
