= Erich Maschke =

German historian

- Born: March 2, 1900; Berlin, German Empire
- Died: February 11, 1982 (aged 81); Heidelberg, West Germany
- Occupations: Nazi ideologue, historian, professor

Erich Maschke (March 2, 1900 – February 11, 1982) was a German historian, history professor, and Nazi ideologue. He last taught at Heidelberg University. During the Nazi era he promoted racist and nationalist ideology. After the war he led the so-called Maschke Commission, commissioned by the West German parliament, which investigated the treatment of German prisoners-of-war during and after World War II by the Allies.

== Biography ==
Born in Berlin on 2 March 1900, Maschke was the son of an ophthalmologist. After graduating from Askanische high school in 1919 he studied medicine at Friedrich Wilhelm University in Berlin, the University of Innsbruck, and the University of Freiburg. He became involved in the Bündische Jugend, a group representative of the German Youth Movement. He served as an editor for the magazine "Der weiße Ritter" ("The white knight"). These experiences led him to change career. He moved to Berlin in 1923, and in 1925 to Königsberg, where he studied history and geography, among other things, under Erich Caspar. In 1927, he completed his doctorate with a thesis on the Teutonic Order, and his habilitation in 1929 with a thesis on Peter's Pence in Poland and eastern Germany. His research also focused on the history and historiography of Prussia and the Late Middle Ages. Throughout his writings on Eastern Europe he expressed racist views.

=== 1933–1945 ===
After completing his habilitation in 1929, Maschke was appointed lecturer. In 1933, he joined the Sturmabteilung (SA). In 1935 he was made a non-tenured associate professor of East and West Slavic history in Konigsberg. Maschke joined the Nazi Party in 1937, and that year was also appointed Chair of Medieval and Modern History at the University of Jena. He became a propagandist for German aggression in Eastern Europe and celebrated what he described as "German right to the East". His research was riddled with racism and claims that German conquests are needed to allow the "growth of the German national body".

In a publication accompanying an exhibition to the Nazi Party in 1938 under the title "Europas Schicksal im Osten" ("Europe's fate in the east"), Maschke posed the question of "east colonization", explaining that this can historically be seen as the "ethnic history of the German return-migration in the once-Germanic East". He coined the phrase "Dreieinheit von Rasse, Volk und Raum" ("trinity of race, ethnicity and space"). Today Maschke's views about national identity are discredited by German historians.

During the Second World War he was in charge of training the Wehrmacht General Staff in Posen (now Poznań). In his journalistic contributions in 1940 and 1941, he welcomed the military change as a prerequisite to the establishment of a German domination in Europe. In 1942 he was called to Leipzig University, where he mainly researched the Middle Ages, especially the Hohenstaufen dynasty. That year, in an internal pamphlet, he praised Germany's aggression in Europe, stating that the Germans alone had "drawn the eastern territory to Europe, organically, without breaks, without symptoms of poisoning [...]". From 1943 to 1945, Maschke lectured on the German American Bund. He also worked as a research consultant with the Amt Rosenberg, participating in the development of curricula for NS-Ordensburgen and worked as an editor for Alfred Rosenberg's Literature Office as well as for the Parteiamtliche Prüfungskommission zum Schutze des nationalsozialistischen Schrifttums (Party Censorship Commission for the Protection of National Socialist Literature). In 1943 he published the results of his research into the imperial history of the house of Hohenstaufen.

=== Post-1945 ===
In 1953, after eight years of being a Soviet prisoner of war, he returned to his family, then living in Speyer. Pursuant to an agreement with the city, he published various works on Speyer's history for several years beginning in 1954. In the same year he received, through Fritz Ernst, a teaching position at Heidelberg University. He taught the trade and economic history of the Middle Ages. In 1956 he became head of the Department of Economic and Social History. From 1959 until his retirement in 1968, he led, together with Werner Conze, the newly founded Institute for Social and Economic History. In the 1960s he published several works on 15th-century German cartels and the history of Gutehoffnungshütte. Through connections in France, including to Fernand Braudel in Toulouse, leader of the Annales school, in 1963 Maschke received one of the first invitations to a German after the Second World War as a visiting professor at the École pratique des hautes études.

In 1958 he was appointed to the Heidelberg Academy of Sciences. From 1968 he was a member of the Heidelberg Academy of Sciences and Humanities and was also instrumental in the preparation for the Staufer exhibition in Stuttgart which took place in 1975.

From 1962 to 1974 he was the editor of a 22-volume series, de:Zur Geschichte der deutschen Kriegsgefangenen des Zweiten Weltkrieges ("On the history of German prisoners of war of the Second World War"). This series was the report compiled by the Scientific Commission for the History of the German Prisoners of War, set up to investigate the killing of Germans captured as prisoners of war. The commission was headed by Maschke and was more popularly known as the Maschke Commission or Maschke Committee. Maschke's commission report accused the Allies of atrocities against Nazi German soldiers taken prisoner.

=== Personal life ===
Maschke married Elsbeth Horn, whom he met in 1931 while she was a student in Heidelberg-Ziegelhausen. Their marriage produced two sons. Maschke committed suicide on 11 February 1982, just days after the death of his wife, who had often accompanied him on meetings, conferences and lecture tours in his later years due to his visual impairment. Maschke's estate is held by the Hauptstaatsarchiv Stuttgart. Some of his documents were given to the Bundesarchiv-Militärarchiv in Freiburg im Breisgau.

== Bibliography ==
- Werner Conze: Nachruf Erich Maschke (1900–1982). In: Vierteljahrschrift für Sozial- und Wirtschaftsgeschichte, Volume 69 (1982), p. 301.
- Friedrich Facius, Jürgen Sydow (Editors.): Inhalt Aus Stadt- und Wirtschaftsgeschichte Südwestdeutschlands. Festschrift für Erich Maschke Volume 75. Geburtstag. Stuttgart 1975.
- Barbara Schneider: Geschichtswissenschaft im Nationalsozialismus – Das Wirken Erich Maschkes in Jena. In: Tobias Kaiser, Steffen Kaudelka, Matthias Steinbach: Historisches Denken und gesellschaftlicher Wandel. Studien zur Geschichtswissenschaft zwischen Kaiserreich und deutscher Zweistaatlichkeit. Berlin 2004, ISBN 3-936411-23-9, pp. 91–114.
- Eckart Schremmer: Erich Maschke (2 March 1900 – 11 February 1982). In: Historische Zeitschrift, Volume 235 (1982), pp. 251–255.
- Michael Schröders: Eine Revolution unseres gesamten Geschichtsbildes? Erich Maschke, die NS-Geschichtsideologie und die politische Schulung in Ordensburgen der NSDAP. In: Nationalsozialismus im Kreis Euskirchen. Band 3: Kultur, Wirtschaft, Tourismus. Editors. vom Geschichtsverein des Kreises Euskirchen. Euskirchen 2011 ISBN 978-3-941037-83-0, pp. 341–415. Präsentation/Kurzfassung bei: Recensio.net, 2011
