= Weinzierl Castle =

Coordinates: 48.1270°N 15.1247°E

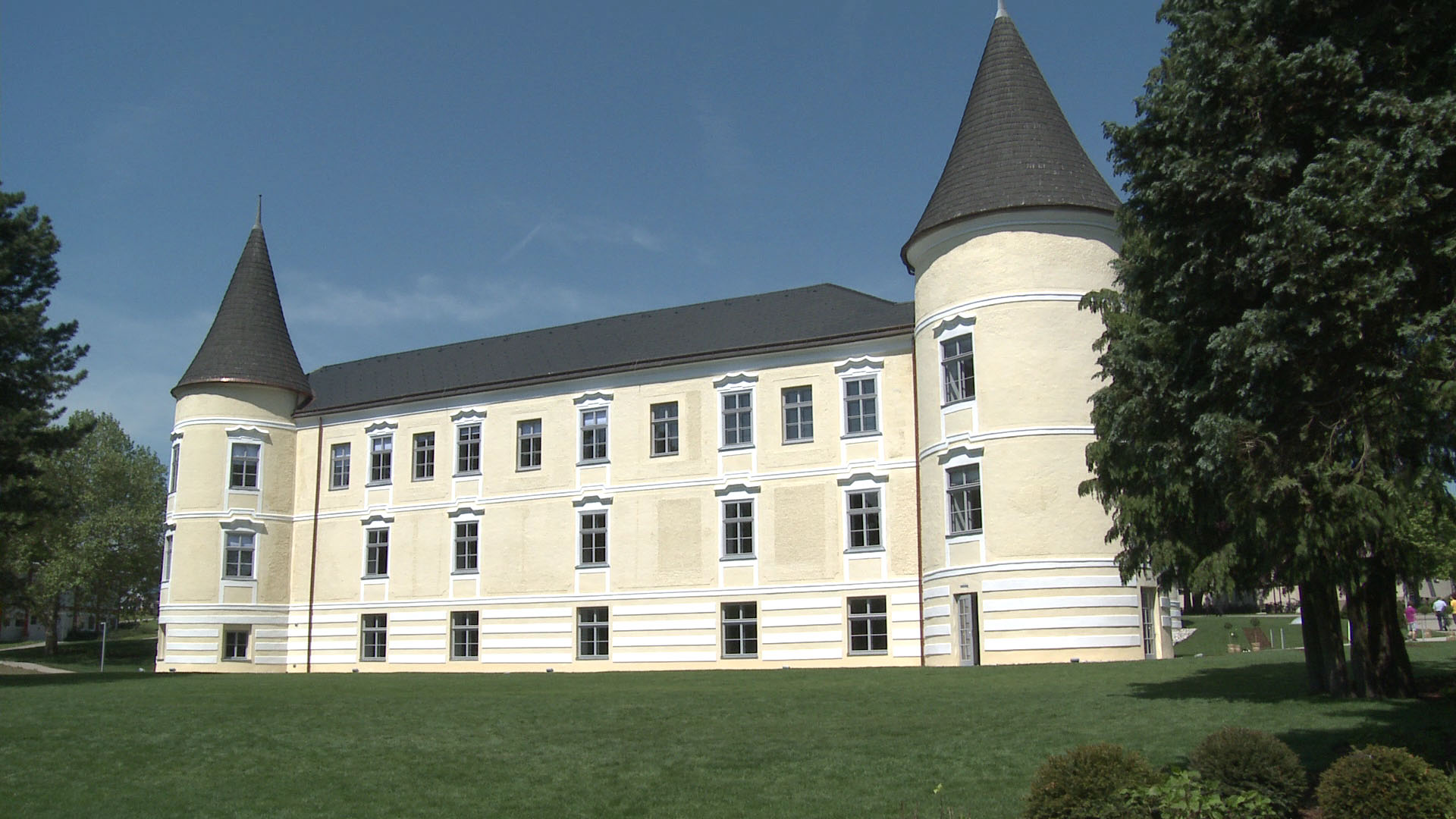
View of the castle from the south

Schloss Weinzierl is a castle in Weinzierl, near Wieselburg/Erlauf in the southwestern Mostviertel region of Lower Austria, located in a park. The essential components of the existing building date to the early 18th century' on earlier foundations. The four-winged castle encloses a courtyard including arcades and corner towers in late-baroque style. The complex also includes an original early Baroque church with post-gothic elements.

Originally used as medieval farm estate, Schloss Weinzierl was expanded in baroque style by Johann Carl Weber von Fürnberg in the 18th century.

A prominent guest that would become very important in music history was the then unknown artist Joseph Haydn, who received his first engagement at this place. Here he also composed his first string quartets around 1755. This tradition has been continuing so far by the annual music festival in Schloss Weinzierl.

At the end of the 18th century, the estate came into Imperial Habsburg possession. In 1883 the so-called "Emperor Franz Joseph Asylum Association" created a home for orphans at Schloss Weinzierl. Previously the Francisco Josephinum, a private two-year agricultural college, had been founded in Mödling in 1869. The patronage was again given by Emperor Franz Joseph.

The castle is currently used for the direction and the administrative department of the Higher Federal Education and Research Institute Francisco Josephinum.
