= University of Applied Sciences Wiener Neustadt =

Austrian Fachhochschule

- Fachhochschule Wiener Neustadt
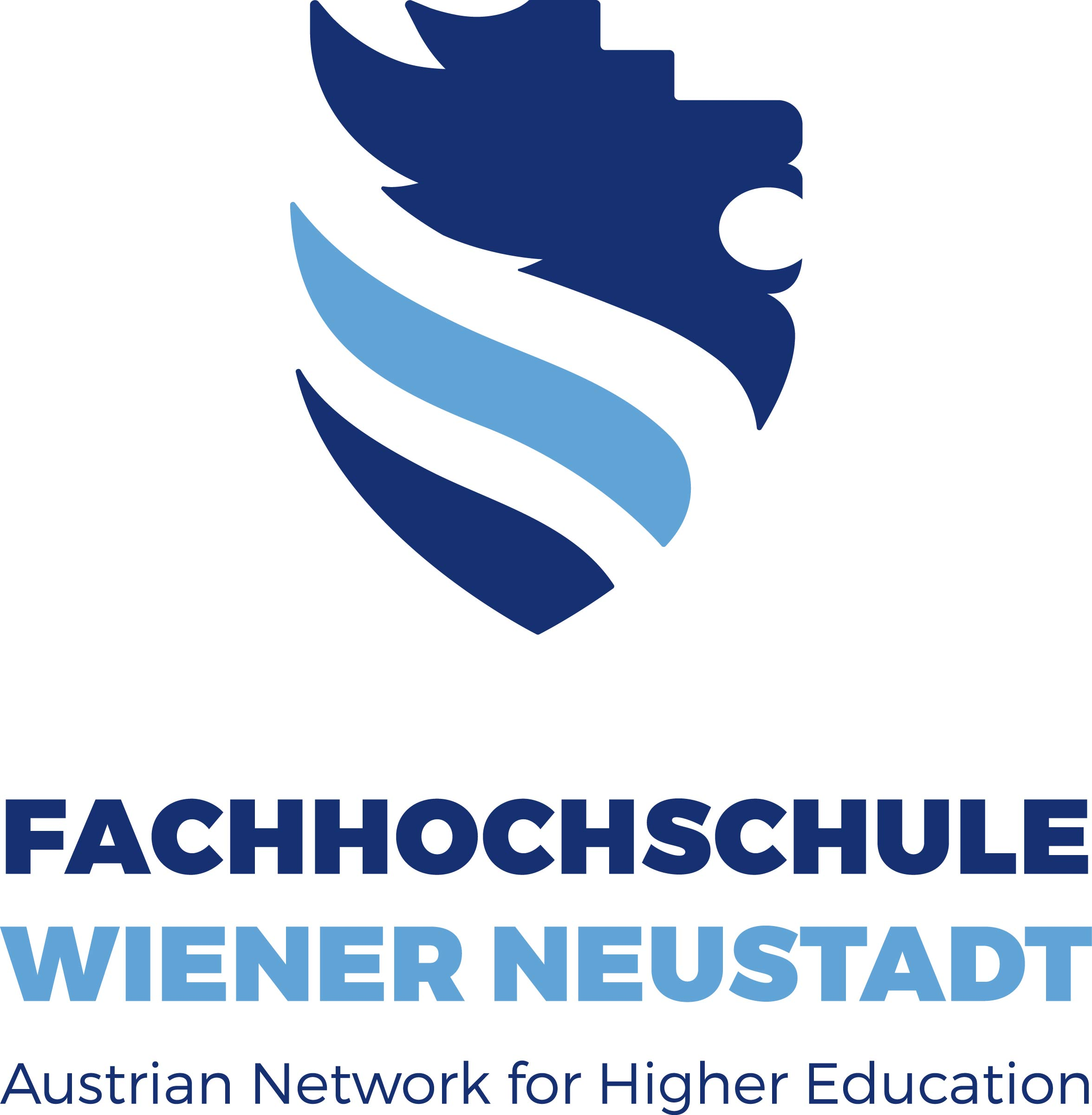
- Established: 1994
- President: Axel Schneeberger; Violeta Kaličanin
- Academic staff: +500
- Students: +4800
- Location: Wiener Neustadt, Wieselburg, Tulln, Wien, Lower Austria, Austria
- Campus: Suburban
- Website: www.fhwn.ac.at/en/

The University of Applied Sciences Wiener Neustadt (German: Fachhochschule Wiener Neustadt, FHWN for short) has been an Austrian Fachhochschule since 1994, offering faculties in Business, Technology, Health, Sport and Safety. At its campuses in Wiener Neustadt, Wieselburg and Tulln (both in Lower Austria) 47 Bachelor’s and Master’s degree programmes are currently offered in German or English..

== History ==
The University of Applied Sciences Wiener Neustadt was founded on 3 October 1994. In its first academic year, a total of 169 students were enrolled on one business and one technical degree programme.

By 1996, the number of students at University of Applied Sciences Wiener Neustadt had more than doubled. The original building (5,000 m²) was therefore extended to 8,700 m².

On 31 August 1999, the University of Applied Sciences Wiener Neustadt was designated as Austria’s first University of Applied Sciences by the Federal Ministry of Science and Education. In September 2002, the Biotechnological Processes degree programme was launched in Tulln.

In 2004, the degree programme at the Wiener Neustadt campus was converted to the new system of Bachelor’s and Master’s degrees in line with the Bologna Process; until then, only diploma programmes (Mag. (FH), Dipl.-Ing. (FH)) had been offered.

In 2005, the Academy for Health Professions moved to the Wiener Neustadt campus and was accredited the following year to offer four Bachelor’s degree programmes. A new degree programme in Police Leadership was also launched in cooperation with the Security Academy of the Federal Ministry of the Interior, primarily for senior officers of the Federal Police.

In autumn 2019, the City Campus was opened in Wiener Neustadt. Since then, all degree programmes offered by the Faculty of Economics at the University of Applied Sciences Wiener Neustadt have been based there. In addition to numerous lecture halls with state-of-the-art equipment, the infrastructure also includes the FHWN StartUp Centre, which features a co-working space. Furthermore, the library has also been housed here in the centre.

== Locations ==
=== Wiener Neustadt ===
==== Campus 1 ====
The Wiener Neustadt site opened in 1994 and was expanded for the first time in 1996. With the opening of the new building in November 2004, the University of Applied Sciences Wiener Neustadt became one of the most modern higher education institutions in Austria. Students also have access to a canteen. They can take part in a range of optional courses and guest lectures, use the library – which spans two floors – and make use of 500 parking spaces.

==== Karmeliterkirche Campus | City Campus ====
In January 2016, it was announced that, in addition to the existing Campus 1 in Civitas Nova, a further campus with a total area of 10,000 m² would be built at the Karmeliterkirche in Wiener Neustadt. Construction began in 2017, and teaching activities commenced at the new site in 2019. The Faculty of Economics moved to the new site, and the university library was housed in the basement of the renovated Karmeliterkirche, alongside the Wiener Neustadt Municipal Library. In addition, the campus features a Start-up Centre including a co-working space, a Science Lab offering students state-of-the-art equipment for teaching and research, as well as a Bloomberg Room and an Experimental Lab.

=== Wieselburg ===
==== Wieselburg Campus | Marketing & Sustainable Innovation ====
Established in September 1999, the Wieselburg site sees itself as a ‘think-box’ for marketing, innovation, consumer science and sustainability, with the aim of designing learning spaces and opening up new ways of thinking.

=== Tulln ===
==== Biotech Campus ====
The Bachelor’s and Master’s degree programmes in ‘Biotechnological Processes’ have been offered in Tulln since 2002. This was followed in 2018 by the Master’s degree programme in ‘Bio Data Science’. The site is one of the most important biotech hubs in Austria, where the House of Digitalisation has also been established.

=== Vienna ===
==== Rudolfinerhaus Campus ====
The Rudolfiner Association – Red Cross is the sponsoring organisation of the Rudolfinerhaus Campus, where the Bachelor’s degree programme in Health and Nursing is offered.

=== Salzburg ===
==== SIAK Salzburg Education Centre Campus ====
Since the summer semester of 2022, the University of Applied Sciences Wiener Neustadt has been offering the Bachelor’s degree programme in Police Leadership at the SIAK Salzburg Education Centre campus.

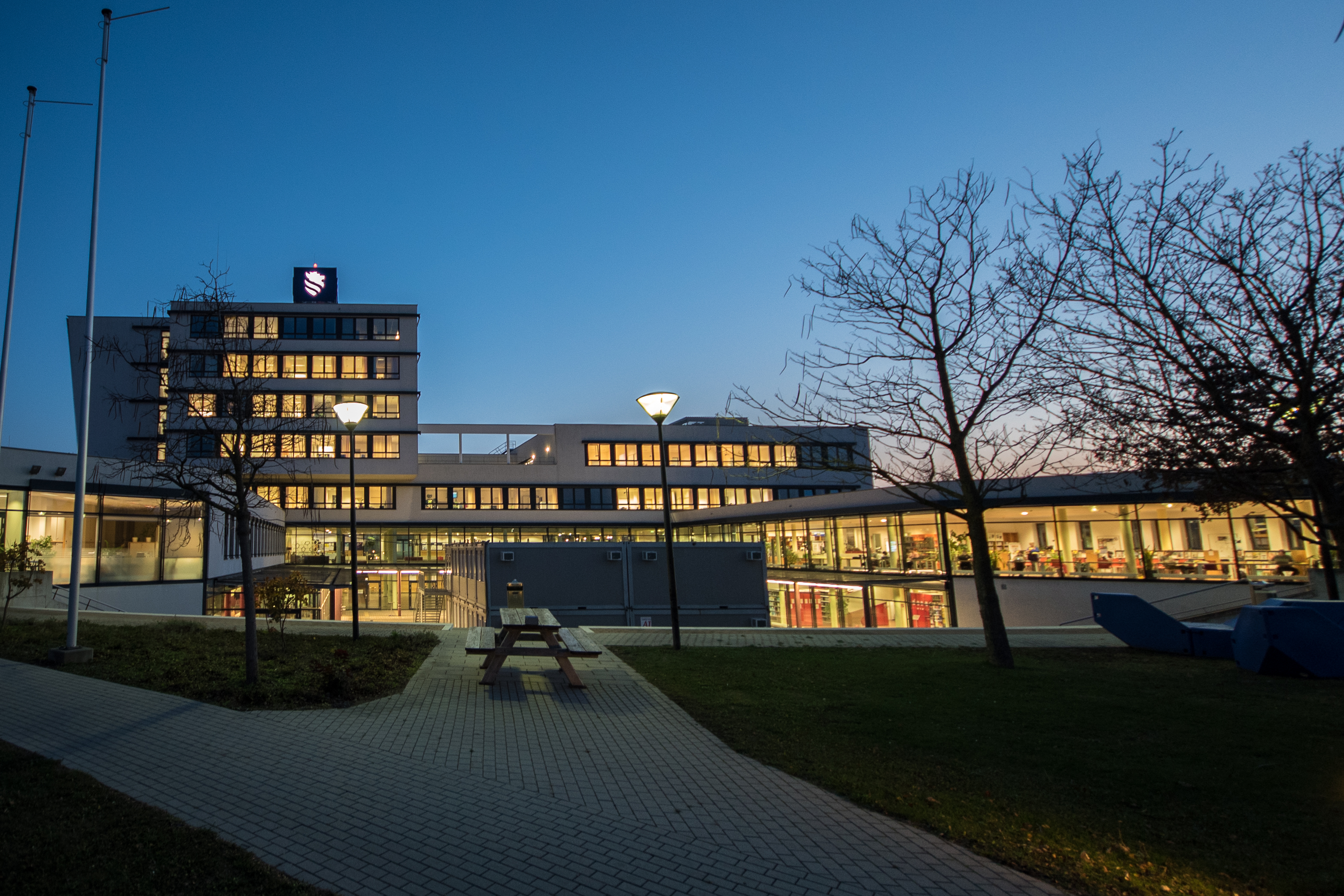
Campus 1

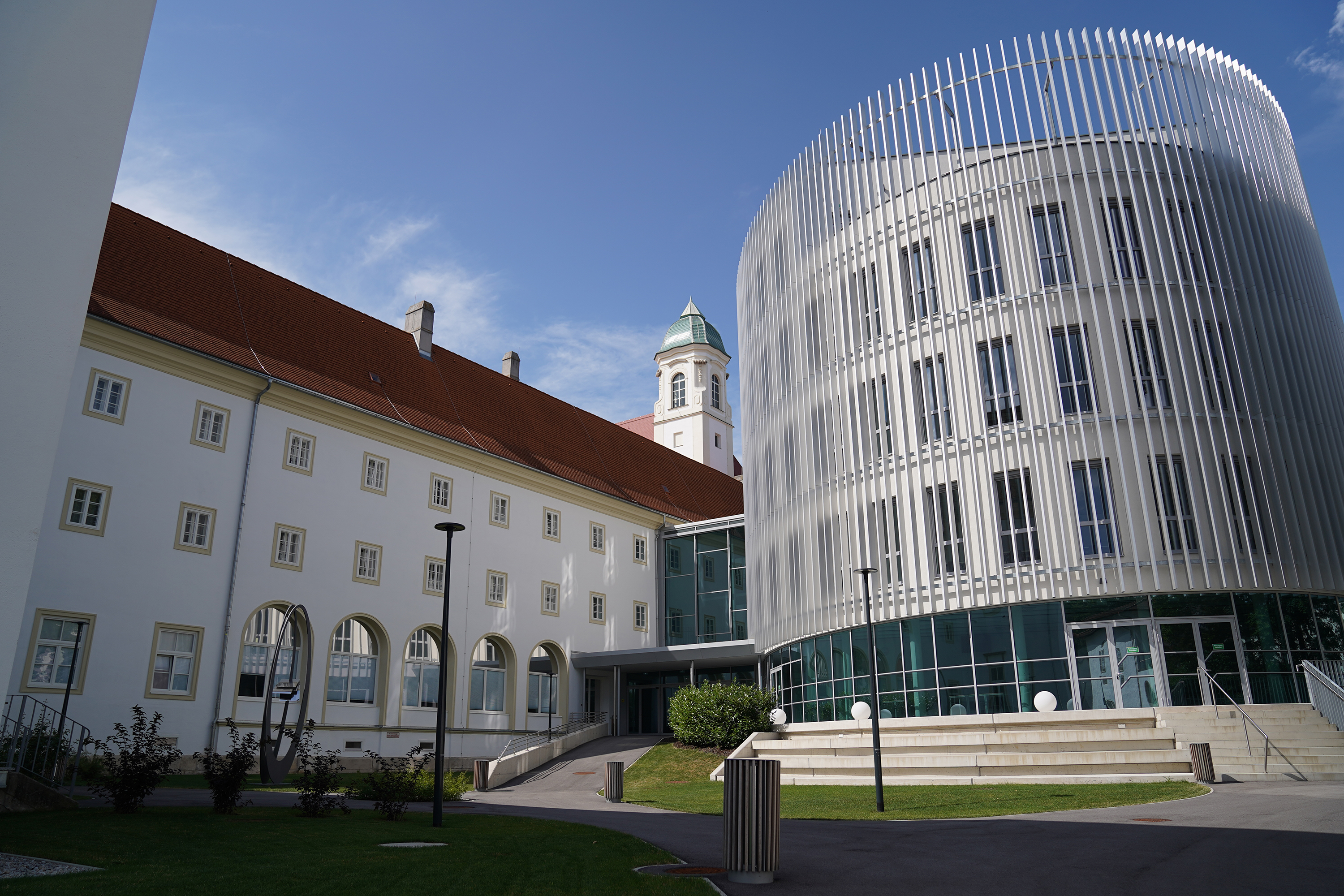
City Campus

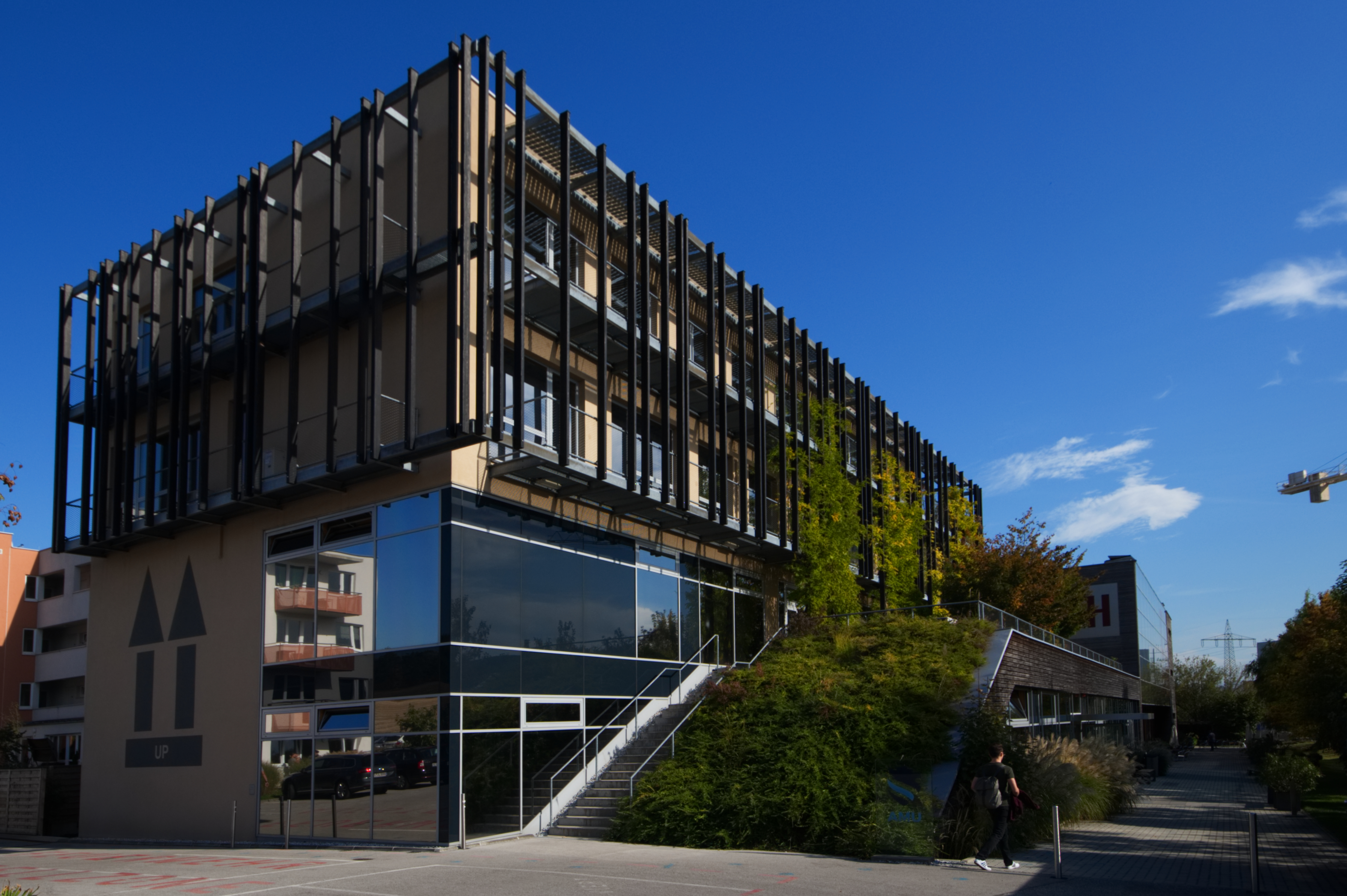
Wieselburg

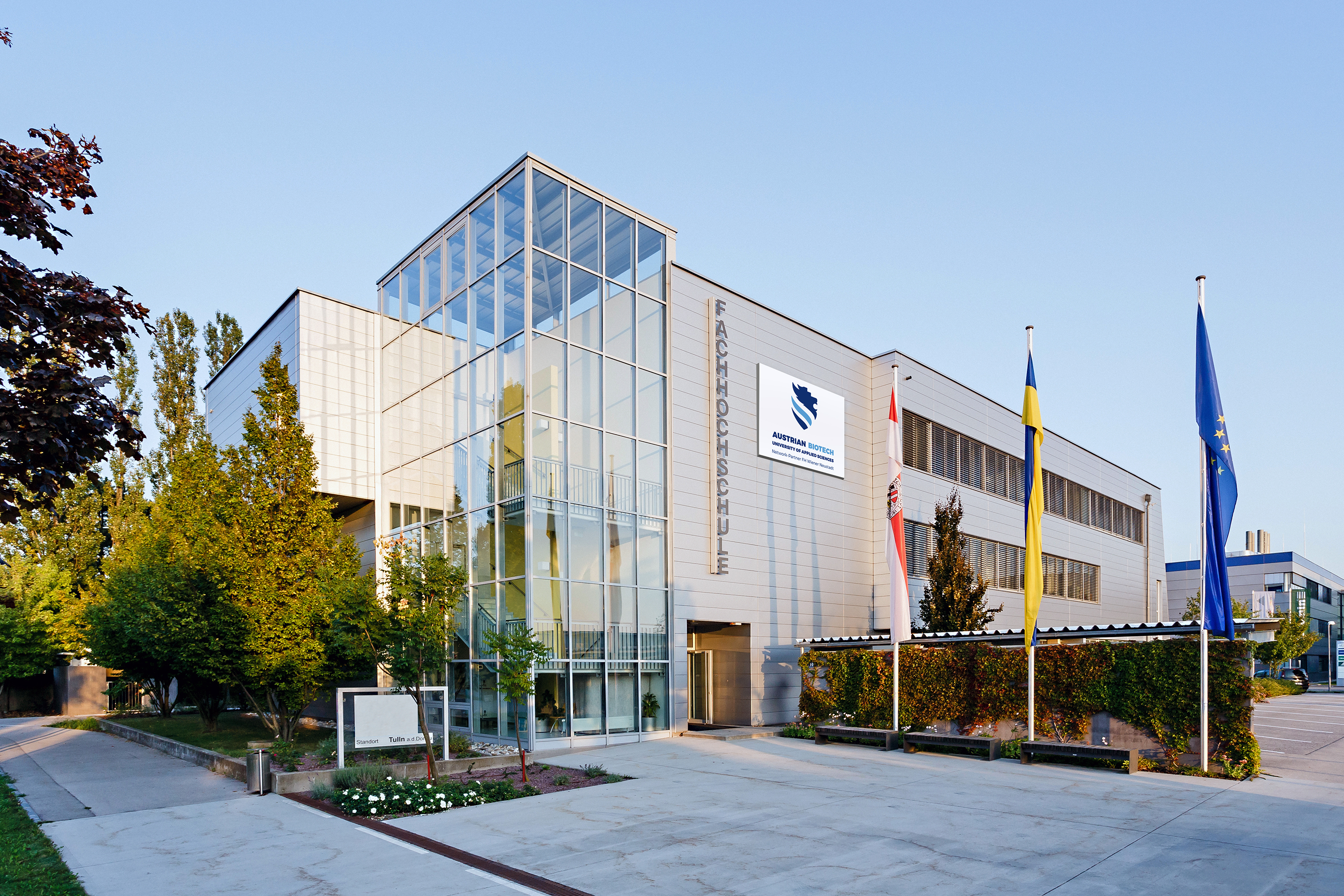
Tulln

== Weblinks ==
- FH Wiener Neustadt
- FOTEC
- ÖH FHWN
