= Francisco Josephinum =

Agricultural school in Wieselburg, Austria

Coordinates: 48°07′37″N 15°07′29″E

- Established: 1869
- Undergraduates: c.75
- Location: Weinzierl Castle, Wieselburg, Austria
- Website: www.josephinum.at

The Francisco Josephinum Secondary College and Research Institute (HBLFA) in Wieselburg is a secondary school for agriculture in Austria.

== History ==
The school was founded in 1869 in Mödling, near Vienna.

In 1934, the school relocated to its present location at Weinzierl Castle in Wieselburg.

== Academics ==
The school is divided into three departments: Agriculture, Agricultural Engineering, Food Technology and Biotechnology.

All students graduate with a Bachelor of Science in Engineering.
