= Karl Davydov =

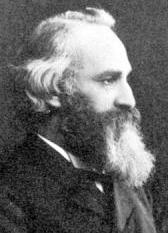

Background information
- Born: Karl Yulievich Davydov; Карл Юльевич Давыдов; 15 March 1838 [O.S. 3 March 1838] Goldingen, Courland Governorate, Russian Empire
- Died: 26 February 1889 [O.S. 14 February 1889] (age 51) Moscow, Imperial Russia
- Genre: Classical
- Occupations: Cellist, composer, conductor, pedagogue
- Instrument: Violoncello
- Years active: fl. ca. 1850–1889

Karl Yulievich Davydov (Russian: Карл Ю́льевич Давы́дов; 15 March [O.S. 3 March] 1838 – 26 February [O.S. 14 February] 1889) was a Russian cellist, described by Pyotr Ilyich Tchaikovsky as the "czar of cellists". He was also a composer, mainly for the cello. His name also appears in various different spellings: Davydov, Davidoff, Davidov, and more, with his first name sometimes written as Charles or Carl.

== Biography ==
Davydov was the son of a Jewish physician and amateur violinist, Yuly Petrovich Davidhoff from Courland Governorate. His elder brother August Davidov was a noted mathematician and educator, and his nephew Alexei Davidov also became cellist and composer and also a businessman.

In his youth Davydov studied mathematics at St. Petersburg University, and then pursued a career as a composer, studying with Moritz Hauptmann at the Leipzig Conservatory. He became a full-time cello soloist in 1850 while continuing to compose. He took a post as a professor of cello at the St Petersburg Conservatory in 1863, and subsequently became director in 1878. In 1886 scandal forced him from his position, and Anton Rubinstein took the helm. He had many students, including Aleksandr Verzhbilovich.

He intended to write an opera on the subject of Mazeppa. Viktor Burenin wrote a libretto for this purpose in 1880, but when Davydov proved unable to find the time to compose, Burenin offered the libretto to Tchaikovsky. Although closely associated with Tchaikovsky, Karl Davydov was not related to the Princes Davydov, Russian Orthodox, into which Tchaikovsky's sister Alexandra married.

Davydov was well-connected with a great number of the top-tier composers, musicians and nobility. In 1870 Count Wilhorsky, a patron of the arts, presented Davydov with a Stradivarius cello constructed in 1712. This cello, now known as the Davidov Stradivarius, was owned by Jacqueline du Pré until her death and is currently on loan to cellist Yo-Yo Ma. Several composers dedicated works to him, notably Tchaikovsy's Cappricio Italien and Anton Arensky's first piano trio.

Davydov went on to write his still-popular "cello school" book of etudes and technique, completed in 1888, taking the physical limitations into considerations for advancing the possibilities in both the bow hand and playing in the high registers. Davydov died in Moscow on 26 February 1889.

In 2019 a Moscow regional cello competition was established in his name.

== Cello transcriptions ==
Davydov transcribed and arranged Chopin's solo piano works for violoncello and piano accompaniment. Transcription albums of Walzer and Mazurkas published by Breitkopf & Härtel. Another transcription album is a selection of Nocturnes and others solo piano works published by Edition Peters.

== Selected works ==
- Op. 5, Cello Concerto No. 1 in B minor (1859)
- Op. 6, Souvenir de Zarizino: 2 salon pieces (Nocturne – Mazurka) for cello and piano
- Op. 7, Fantasie from a Russian folk song for cello and orchestra
- Op. 9, 3 Pièces caractéristiques for cello and piano
- Op. 11, Concert Allegro in A minor for cello and orchestra or cello and piano
- Op. 14, Cello Concerto No. 2 in A minor (1863) (1860?)
- Op. 16, 3 Salon pieces (Mondnacht, Lied, Märchen) for cello and piano
- Op. 17, Souvenirs d'Oranienbaum (Adian – Barcarolle)
- Op. 18, Cello Concerto No. 3 in D major (1868)
- Op. 20, 4 Pieces for Cello and Piano
  1. Sonntag Morgen (Sunday Morning)
  2. Am Springbrunnen (At the Fountain)
  3. An der Wiege
  4. Abenddämmerung
- Op. 23, Romance sans Paroles in G major
- Op. 25, Ballade for cello and orchestra or piano in G major (1875)
- Op. 30, 3 salon pieces
- Op. 31, Cello Concerto No. 4 in E minor (1878)
- Op. 35, String Sextet
- Op. 37, Suite pour l'orchestre (Suite for Orchestra)
  1. Scéne rustique
  2. Quasi valse
  3. Scherzo
  4. Petite romance
  5. Marche
- "Poltawa", Opera after Pushkin (1876, unfinished)
- Hymn for 10 Celli and Percussion
- Op. 40, Quintet for Piano and Strings in G minor (1884)
