= String Quartets, Op. 51 (Brahms) =

String Quartets No. 1 and 2 by Brahms

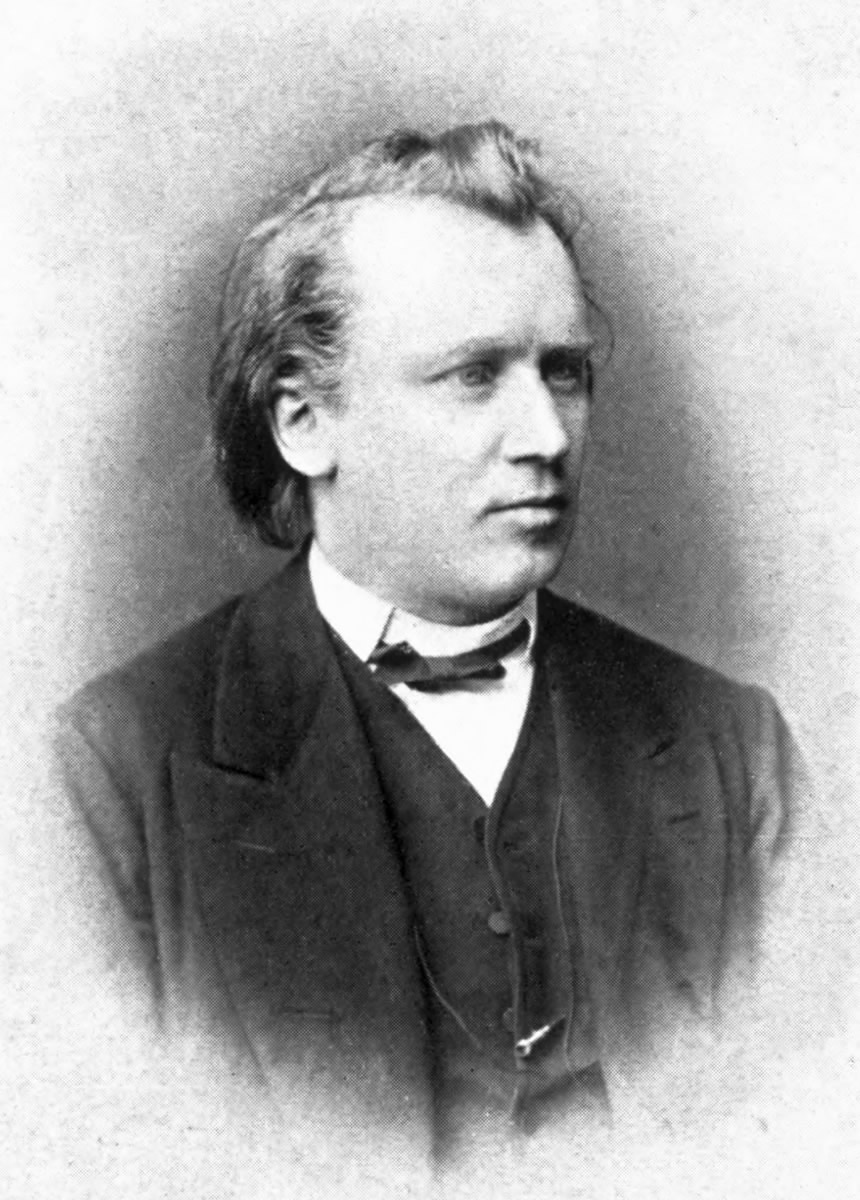
Johannes Brahms, photographed c. 1872

Johannes Brahms' String Quartet No. 1 in C minor and String Quartet No. 2 in A minor were completed in Tutzing, Bavaria, during the summer of 1873, and published together that autumn as Op. 51. They are dedicated to his friend Theodor Billroth. He only published one other string quartet, String Quartet No. 3, in 1876.

== Composition ==
Brahms was slow in writing his first two string quartets. A letter from Joseph Joachim indicates that a C minor quartet was in progress in 1865, but it may not have been the same work that would become Op. 51 No. 1 in 1873. Four years before publication, however, in 1869, we know for certain that the two quartets were complete enough to be played through. But the composer remained unsatisfied. Years passed. New practice runs then occurred in Munich, probably in June 1873, and Brahms ventured south of the city to the small lakeside town of Tutzing for a summer respite. There, with the Würmsee (as Lake Starnberg was then called) and the Bavarian Prealps as backdrop, he put the finishing touches on the two quartets.

He was 40 years old at the time of publication. Brahms regarded the string quartet as a particularly important genre. He reportedly destroyed some twenty string quartets before allowing the two Op. 51 quartets to be published. Explaining his progress to a publisher in 1869, Brahms wrote that as Mozart had taken "particular trouble" over the six "beautiful" Haydn Quartets, he intended to do his "very best to turn out one or two passably decent ones." According to his friend Max Kalbeck, Brahms insisted on hearing a secret performance of the Op. 51 quartets before they were published, after which he substantially revised them.

== Influences ==
During Brahms' lifetime, the string quartet, like the symphony, was a genre dominated by the compositions of Ludwig van Beethoven. Brahms had remarked of Beethoven in 1872, a year before finishing his first quartets, "You can't have any idea what it's like always to hear such a giant marching behind you!" In choosing to write both his first string quartet and symphony in the key of C minor, the key in which Beethoven composed some of his greatest and most characteristic works, Brahms may have been seeking to acknowledge as well as break free from Beethoven's daunting influence.

The influence of Franz Schubert is also strong on these works, particularly on the quartet in C minor. Structurally and thematically, the first movement of the C minor quartet bears a strong resemblance to Schubert's Quartettsatz, D. 703, also in C minor.

== Structure ==
=== String Quartet No. 1 ===
The "terse", "tragic" String Quartet No. 1 in C minor is remarkable for its organic unity and for the harmonically sophisticated, "orchestrally inclined" outer movements that bracket its more intimate inner movements. The quartet consists of four movements:

1. Allegro (C minor, ends in C major)
2. Romanze: Poco adagio (A♭ major)
3. Allegretto molto moderato e comodo (F minor, ends in F major)
4. Allegro (C minor)

=== String Quartet No. 2 ===
The String Quartet No. 2 in A minor, also highly unified thematically, is comparatively lyrical, although culminating in a dramatic and propulsive finale whose tension "derives...from a metrical conflict between theme and accompaniment." Like Brahms's Piano Quartet No. 1 and Violin Concerto, the A minor quartet has a final movement modeled on a Hungarian folk dance, in this case a czárdás. The quartet consists of four movements:

1. Allegro non troppo (A minor)
2. Andante moderato (A major)
3. Quasi Minuetto, moderato (A minor)
4. Finale. Allegro non assai (A minor)

With all the movements in A minor or A major, the String Quartet No. 2 is therefore homotonal. Each quartet lasts about half an hour in performance.

== Critical reception ==
The Op. 51 string quartets were received "respectfully if without great enthusiasm" at their respective premieres in October and December 1873. While the quartets have enjoyed less popularity than some of Brahms's other chamber music, they helped revitalize "the great but moribund tradition" of the string quartet that had stagnated after Beethoven and Schubert, and helped inspire the quartets of Arnold Schoenberg, Béla Bartók, and other twentieth century composers. In his famous essay "Brahms the Progressive", Schoenberg praised the quartets for their advanced harmony and for the unprecedented completeness with which Brahms derives each movement from a tiny motif.

The Op. 51 quartets have been recorded by many ensembles including the Amadeus Quartet, Quartetto Italiano, Alban Berg Quartet, Cleveland Quartet, Tokyo String Quartet, Emerson Quartet, Chiara String Quartet, New Zealand String Quartet and Takács Quartet.
