= Piano Trio No. 1 (Arensky) =

1894 composition by Anton Arensky

Piano Trio in D minor
- No. 1
- by Anton Arensky
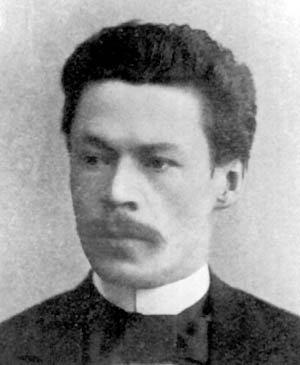
- The composer
- Key: D minor
- Opus: 32
- Composed: 1894
- Dedication: Karl Davydov
- Movements: four

Piano Trio No. 1 in D minor, Op. 32, for violin, cello and piano is a 1894 Romantic chamber composition by the Russian composer Anton Arensky. The trio is dedicated to the memory of the renowned Russian cellist, Karl Davydov.

The composer made a very early recording of the trio on wax cylinders, with the violinist Jan Hřímalý, the cellist Anatoliy Brandukov, and himself at the piano. This recording was made shortly after its composition and is almost certainly its first recording, although it is not complete.

== Music ==
There are four movements:

1. Allegro moderato (in D minor and in sonata form)
2. Scherzo (Allegro molto) (in D major and in ternary form)
3. Elegia (Adagio) (in G minor and in ternary form)
4. Finale (Allegro non troppo) (in D minor and in rondo form)

Unlike the agitated opening melody of the first movement from Mendelssohn's Piano Trio No. 1, the piece opens gently, lyrically and elegiacally, setting an autumnal mood of the whole work. The first movement ends with a coda marked Adagio.

The second movement in the parallel key (tonic major) features flying notes, and a waltz-like middle section mainly in B-flat major. The movement is cheerful throughout.

Following the cheerful scherzo comes the contrasting and sad slow movement in the subdominant minor. Presenting no formal grief but memorial thoughts, this movement is deeply elegiac but not funereal. The middle section begins in G major but involves a number of key modulations, which makes the passage that initially evokes a brighter mood even more affecting yet dreamlike later on.

Back in D minor, the final movement opens dramatically. Later comes a recollection of themes from the third and first movements, which is followed by a turbulent ending that restates the primary theme of this movement.
