= Recensio.net =

recensio.net – review platform for European history – is a Europe-wide, multi-language platform for scholarly reviews of historical literature. Launched in January 2011, the platform is operated by three institutions: the Bavarian State Library in Munich, the German Historical Institute Paris, and the Institute of European History in Mainz. It has been described by the media as an attempt of historians to "venture into the Web 2.0".

== Concept ==
The aim of the platform is to answer a perceived restriction of the humanities in Europe, a widespread orientation on languages and national borders. Recensio.net attempts to promote and facilitate the exchange between and the scholarly discussion amongst European historians, primarily by making reviews of publications on European history more visible and easier to access. To accomplish that, all reviews published on recensio.net are available in Open Access and searchable in full text. The Bavarian State Library Munich supports the reviews with metadata and long-term archival storage.

recensio.net acts as an Open Access aggregator. It brings together reviews of recent historical publications published in scholarly journals on one platform. The reviews deal with European history and may have been published both online or in print. All editorial offices of cooperating journals still work independently. Currently, the platform features review sections of more than forty historical journals from all over Europe, amongst them Reviews in History published by Britain's Institute of Historical Research (IHR) and the German Historical Institute London Bulletin.

On the second branch of the platform, authors of historical monographs and articles can present the core statements of their publications, thus putting them up for scholarly discussion. Users can comment on both reviews and presentations, and become involved in the discussion of current topics and approaches within the field of European history. In doing so, recensio.net aims to promote the ideas of web 2.0 amongst European historians.

To overcome the language barrier, the platform uses three navigational languages (English, German and French), whereas reviews and presentations may be written in any European language. Currently, texts in more than ten different languages can be found on recensio.net.

Since the institutionalisation of Specialised Information Services (FID), funded by the German Research Foundation, in 2014 several branches of recensio.net emerged on the same technical basis and with the same concept for regional history (recensio.regio), classics (recensio.antiquitatis), and art history (recension.artium) that offer reviews in open access in their respective fields.

== Organising institutions ==
Online since January 2011, recensio.net is the result of a joint project of the Bavarian State Library (BSB) Munich, the University of Cologne and the Leibniz Institute of European History (IEG) Mainz, funded from 2008 to 2014 by the German Research Foundation (DFG). Since 2017 the operations of recensio.net are continued in the sole responsibility of the Bavarian State Library. The editorial staff is located at the Centre for Electronic Publishing (ZEP), a unit of the BSB.

On the occasion of the launch of recensio.net, the international conference "Scholarly communication in the digital age", took place in January 2011 at the Historisches Kolleg in Munich.
