= Anton Arensky =

Russian composer, pianist and professor of music

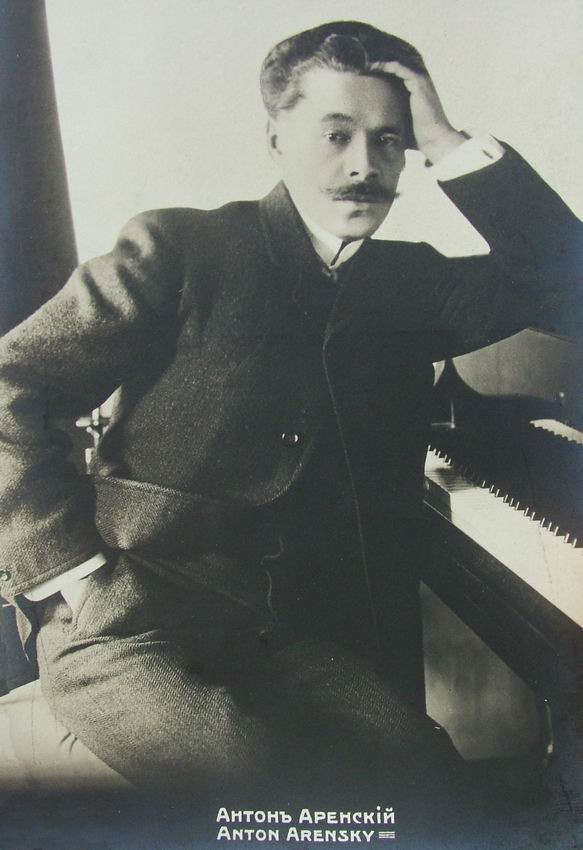
Anton Arensky, 1895

Anton Stepanovich Arensky (Russian: Анто́н Степа́нович Аре́нский; 12 July [O.S. 30 June] 1861 – 25 February [O.S. 12 February] 1906) was a Russian composer of Romantic classical music, pianist, conductor and professor of music. He is known especially for his chamber music, songs and piano works, and for a style often associated with the lyricism of Pyotr Ilyich Tchaikovsky.

== Biography ==
Arensky was born into an affluent, music-loving family in Novgorod, Russian Empire. His father was a doctor and amateur cellist, while his mother was a pianist; Arensky began piano lessons as a child and was composing songs and piano pieces by the age of nine. In 1879 he moved with his family to Saint Petersburg, where he studied composition privately with Karl Karlovich Zikke and then entered the Saint Petersburg Conservatory. There he studied composition and music theory with Nikolai Rimsky-Korsakov, graduating in 1882 with a gold medal.

After graduating, Arensky was appointed to the Moscow Conservatory, where he taught harmony, counterpoint and composition. His pupils included Sergei Rachmaninoff, Alexander Scriabin, Reinhold Glière, Aleksandr Goldenweiser, Konstantin Igumnov, Georgy Konyus and Arseny Koreshchenko. During his Moscow years he also came into contact with Tchaikovsky and Sergei Taneyev, and his music increasingly reflected Tchaikovsky's influence rather than the nationalist idiom associated with Rimsky-Korsakov's circle.

In 1895 Arensky returned to Saint Petersburg as director of the Imperial Chapel Choir, a position for which he had been recommended by Mily Balakirev. He remained in the post until 1901, after which he lived on a pension and continued to appear as a pianist, conductor and composer. His catalogue includes three operas, a ballet, two symphonies, concertos, orchestral suites, chamber works, piano music, choral music and songs.

Arensky died of tuberculosis at Perkjärvi, near Terijoki in the Russian-administered Grand Duchy of Finland, at the age of 44. He was buried in the Tikhvin Cemetery in Saint Petersburg. Rimsky-Korsakov later wrote critically of Arensky's personal habits, claiming that gambling and drinking had damaged his health.

The Antarctic Arensky Glacier was named after him by the USSR Academy of Sciences in 1987.

== Music ==
Pyotr Ilyich Tchaikovsky was the most important influence on Arensky's mature musical language. Nikolai Rimsky-Korsakov famously wrote: "In his youth, Arensky did not escape some influence from me; later, the influence came from Tchaikovsky. He will quickly be forgotten." The perception that Arensky lacked a strongly individual style contributed to the long-term neglect of much of his music, though his chamber works and some orchestral pieces continued to attract performers.

Arensky's best-known work is the Variations on a Theme by Tchaikovsky, Op. 35a, for string orchestra. It originated as the slow movement of his String Quartet No. 2 in A minor, Op. 35, written in 1894 in memory of Tchaikovsky. The theme is based on "Legend", No. 5 from Tchaikovsky's Sixteen Songs for Children, Op. 54. The movement became sufficiently popular for Arensky to arrange it separately for string orchestra.

Arensky was particularly associated with chamber music. His Piano Trio No. 1 in D minor, Op. 32, was written in memory of the cellist Karl Davydov, and his chamber catalogue also includes two string quartets, a piano quintet and a second piano trio. He also wrote more than 100 piano pieces, including suites for two pianos, preludes, studies and character pieces.

== Selected works ==
=== Opera ===
- Сон на Волге (Son na Volge / Dream on the Volga), Op. 16 (1888), libretto by Anton Arensky after Alexander Ostrovsky's play Voyevoda; premiere: January 2, 1891 [OS December 21, 1890], Moscow, Bolshoi Theatre
- Рафаэль (Rafael / Raphael), Op. 37 (1894), libretto by A. Kryukov; premiere: May 6 [OS April 24], 1894, Moscow Conservatory
- Наль и Дамаянти (Nal' i Damayanti / Nal and Damayanti), Op. 47 (1903), after the Indian epic Mahabharata, libretto by Modest Ilyich Tchaikovsky after the poem by Vasily Zhukovsky; premiere: January 22 [OS January 9], 1904, Moscow, Bolshoi Theatre

=== Ballet ===
- Egyptian Nights (Russian: Египетские ночи), also known as Une Nuit d'Égypte or Nuits égyptiennes (1900), divertissement-ballet in one act. It was originally composed for the Imperial Ballet in Saint Petersburg, with choreography planned by Lev Ivanov, but the production was not staged because of Ivanov's death before its completion.
  - Revived by Mikhail Fokine for the Imperial Ballet at the Mariinsky Theatre, 8 March [O.S. 24 February] 1908.
  - Revived by Fokine as Cléopâtre for the Ballets Russes at the Théâtre du Châtelet, Paris, 2 June 1909, with additional music by Alexander Glazunov, Mikhail Glinka, Modest Mussorgsky, Nikolai Rimsky-Korsakov, Sergei Taneyev and Nikolai Tcherepnin.

=== Orchestral ===
Pamyati Suvorova (To the Memory of Suvorov) (1900)
Performed by
Russian Philharmonic Orchestra
Dmitry Yablonsky (conductor)
Courtesy of Naxos

- Concerto for Piano and Orchestra in F minor, Op. 2 (1881)
- Symphony No. 1 in B minor, Op. 4 (1883)
- Suite No. 1 in G minor, Op. 7 (1885)
- Intermezzo in G minor, Op. 13 (1882)
- Symphony No. 2 in A major, Op. 22 (1889)
- Suite No. 2, "Silhouettes", Op. 23 (originally for two pianos, 1892)
- Suite No. 3, "Variations", Op. 33 (originally for two pianos, 1894)
- Variations on a Theme by Tchaikovsky, Op. 35a, for string orchestra (1894)
- Fantasia on Themes of Ryabinin, Op. 48, for piano and orchestra (1899), also known as Fantasia on Russian Folksongs
- Concerto for Violin and Orchestra in A minor, Op. 54 (1891)
- Pamyati Suvorova (To the Memory of Suvorov, 1900)

=== Chamber ===
- String Quartet No. 1 in G major, Op. 11 (1888)
- Serenade, Op. 30, No. 2, for violin and piano
- Piano Trio No. 1 in D minor, Op. 32 (1894)
- String Quartet No. 2 in A minor, Op. 35 (1894), scored either for standard string quartet or for violin, viola and two cellos
- Piano Quintet in D major, Op. 51 (1900)
- Two Pieces, Op. 12, for cello and piano
- Four Pieces, Op. 56, for cello and piano
- Piano Trio No. 2 in F minor, Op. 73 (1905)

=== Piano ===
For solo piano unless otherwise specified:

- Suite for Two Pianos No. 1 in F major, Op. 15 (1888)
- Suite for Two Pianos No. 2, "Silhouettes", Op. 23 (1892), also orchestrated
- Four Morceaux, Op. 25 (1893)
- Six Essais sur des rythmes oubliés, Op. 28 (c. 1893)
- Suite for Two Pianos No. 3, "Variations", Op. 33 (1894), also orchestrated
- 24 Morceaux caractéristiques, Op. 36, covering all 24 major and minor keys (1894)
- Four Etudes, Op. 41 (1896)
- Three Morceaux, Op. 42 (1898)
- Six Caprices, Op. 43 (1898)
- Près de la mer, six sketches, Op. 52 (1901)
- Six Pieces, Op. 53 (1901)
- Suite for Two Pianos No. 4, Op. 62 (1903)
- Twelve Preludes, Op. 63 (1903)
- Twelve Pieces for piano four hands, Op. 66 (1903)
- Arabesques, Op. 67 (1903)
- Twelve Etudes, Op. 74 (1905)

=== Choral ===
- Cantata for the Tenth Anniversary of the Sacred Coronation of Their Imperial Highnesses, Op. 25 (1893)
- The Fountain of Bakhchisarai, Op. 46, cantata
- Three Vocal Quartets, Op. 57, with cello accompaniment
- The Diver, Op. 61, cantata

=== Solo vocal ===
- Romances, Op. 17, for voice and piano

=== Arrangements of Arensky's music ===
- Tempo di valse from the Concerto for Violin and Orchestra in A minor, Op. 54, arranged for violin and piano by Jascha Heifetz

== Recordings ==
Arensky's music has been recorded by a number of soloists, chamber ensembles and orchestras. The following selected recordings include orchestral, chamber and piano works:

Year of release	Work or album	Performers	Label / catalogue	Notes
1995	Arensky: Chamber Works; String Quartets Nos. 1 and 2; Piano Quintet in D major, Op. 51	Lajtha Quartet; Ilona Prunyi, piano	Marco Polo 8.223811	Includes the two string quartets and the Piano Quintet.
2006	Piano Concerto in F minor, Op. 2	Paul Van Ness, piano; Plovdiv Philharmonic Orchestra; Nayden Todorov, conductor	Music Minus One MMO3080	A Music Minus One edition.
2008	Arensky: Piano Concerto in F minor	Konstantin Scherbakov, piano; Russian Philharmonic Orchestra; Dmitry Yablonsky, conductor	Naxos 8.570526	Includes the Piano Concerto, Ryabinin Fantasia, Pamyati Suvorova and other orchestral works.
2009	Tchaikovsky & Arensky: Piano Concertos	Felicja Blumental, piano; Orchestra of the Vienna Musikgesellschaft; Michael Gielen, conductor	Brana Records Collection BR0013	Includes Arensky's Piano Concerto in F minor.
2011	Arensky: String Quartets Nos. 1 & 2 & Piano Quintet	Ying Quartet; Adam Neiman, piano	Dorian Sono Luminus DSL-92143	Includes both string quartets and the Piano Quintet.
2011	Nikolay Rimsky-Korsakov: Piano Trio; Anton Arensky: Piano Trio No. 1	Kinsky Trio Prague	Praga PRD250285D	Includes Piano Trio No. 1 in D minor, Op. 32.
2012	Tchaikovsky: The Seasons; Arensky: Piano Trio No. 1	Arensky Trio	Northern Flowers NFPMA9997	Includes Piano Trio No. 1 in D minor, Op. 32.
2012	Borodin: String Sextet; Glazunov: String Quintet; Arensky: String Quartet No. 2	Nash Ensemble	Onyx 4067	Includes String Quartet No. 2 in A minor, Op. 35.
2013	Arensky & Taneyev: Piano Quintets	Piers Lane, piano; Goldner String Quartet	Hyperion CDA67965	Includes Piano Quintet in D major, Op. 51.
2014	Piano Trio No. 1 in D minor, Op. 32	Leonore Piano Trio	Hyperion CDA68015	Recorded in 2013 and released by Hyperion in 2014.
2020	Shostakovich, Arensky & Mendelssohn: Piano Trios No. 1	Trio Zeliha	Mirare MIR522	Includes Arensky's Piano Trio No. 1 in D minor, Op. 32.
2025	Tchaikovsky: Serenade for Strings; Arensky: Variations on a Theme by Tchaikovsky	Philharmonia Hungarica; Antal Doráti, conductor	Eloquence 4845531	Includes Variations on a Theme by Tchaikovsky, Op. 35a, recorded in 1958.
