= String Quartet No. 3 (Brahms) =

1875 chamber work by Brahms

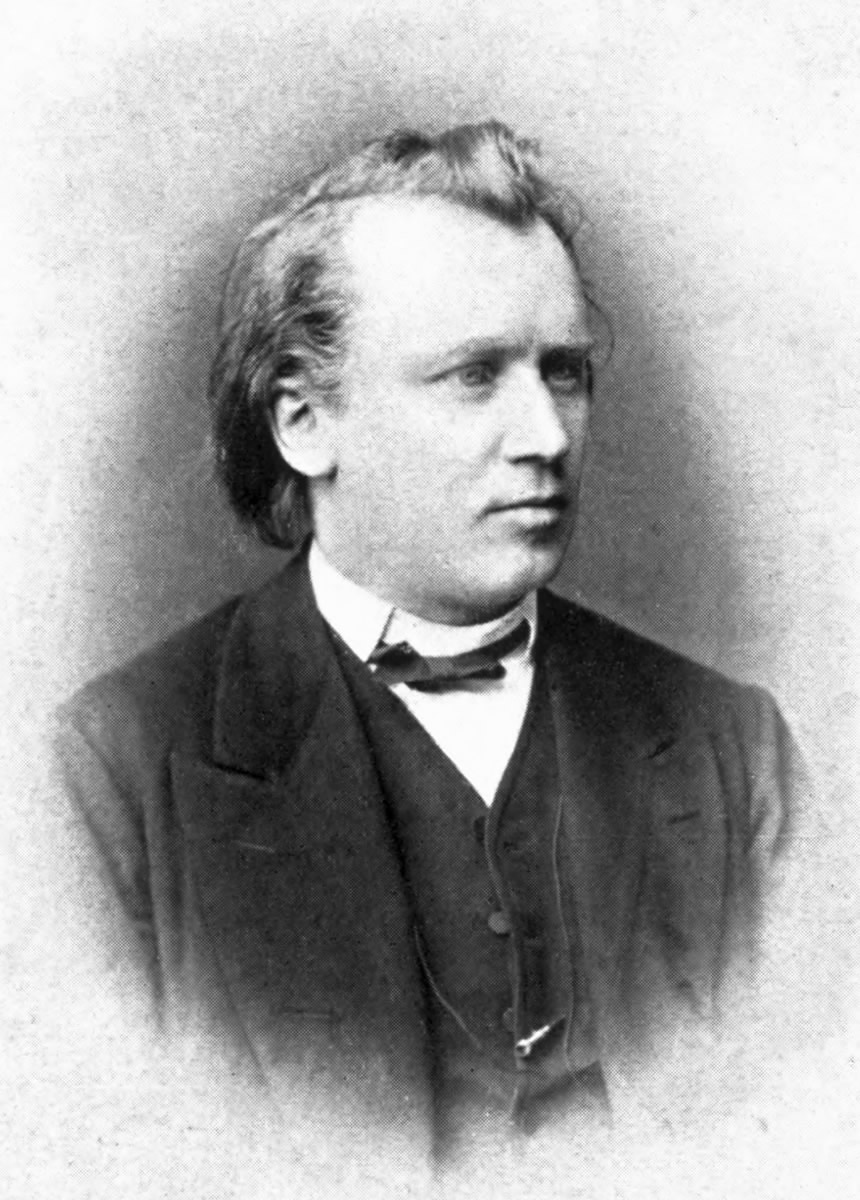
Johannes Brahms, photographed c. 1872

The String Quartet No. 3 in B♭ major, Op. 67, was composed by Johannes Brahms in the summer of 1875 and published by the firm of Fritz Simrock. It received its premiere performance on October 30, 1876 in Berlin. It has four movements:

1. Vivace (B♭ major)
2. Andante (F major)
3. Agitato (Allegretto non troppo) — Trio — Coda (D minor)
4. Poco Allegretto con Variazioni (B♭ major)

Brahms composed the work in Ziegelhausen, near Heidelberg, and dedicated it to Professor Theodor Wilhelm Engelmann, an amateur cellist who had hosted Brahms on a visit to Utrecht. Brahms was at the time the artistic director of the Vienna Gesellschaft der Musikfreunde. The work is lighthearted and cheerful, "a useless trifle", as he put it, "to avoid facing the serious countenance of a symphony", referring to the work on his Symphony No. 1 which debuted a week later.

The irony to this quartet is that although the quartet is dedicated to Engelmann, who was a cellist, throughout the entire quartet, there is no cello melody; the violins would have a melody throughout the piece and in the third movement, the Agitato, the melody of the movement is mainly played by a viola instead of the cello. Engelmann was rather puzzled by how the quartet was thus configured, but appreciated its dedication to him all the same. In a letter about the quartet to Engelmann, Brahms said "This quartet rather resembles your wife—very dainty, but brilliant! ...It's no longer a question of a forceps delivery; but of simply standing by. There’s no cello solo in it, but such a tender viola solo that you may want to change your instrument for its sake!".
