= String Quartet No. 2 (Arensky) =

The String Quartet No. 2 in A minor, Op. 35, is a piece of chamber music in three movements by Anton Arensky. Composed in 1894, it is unusually scored for violin, viola and two cellos. Arensky dedicated it to the memory of Pyotr Ilyich Tchaikovsky, who had died the previous year.

== History ==
Arensky was professor at the Moscow Conservatory and a friend of Tchaikovsky, whose music influenced him. After Tchaikovsky had died, Arensky wrote the quartet in memory of him, following a Russian tradition that Tchaikovsky had also observed when he composed his Piano Trio "À la mémoire d'un grand artiste", Op. 50, in memory of Nikolai Rubinstein. Both compositions are set in A minor.

Arensky structured the quartet in three movements:

1. Moderato
2. Variations sur un thême de P. Tschaikowsky. Moderato
3. Finale: Andante sostenuto; Allegro moderato

Dense harmonies dominate the work to help create an elegiac mood. The instrumentation with two cellos gives the quartet a dark but also warm timbre that is reminiscent of Franz Schubert's String Quintet.

The first and third movements use motifs from the panikhida, the Russian orthodox liturgical service for the repose of the departed. The middle movement is a set of variations based on a theme from Tchaikovsky's song Legend, the fifth of his Sixteen Songs for Children, Op. 54. The finale is reminiscent of Beethoven's Rasumovsky Quartets in its use of a featured Russian folk melody in its fast sections but differs strikingly for its tempo changes and unsystematic approach to sonata form. In contrast to Beethoven's conception, Arensky's finale achieves a quick means to round off the entire work with contemplative passages alternating with brilliant passagework.

== Reception ==
Together with his Piano Trio No. 1, this string quartet is considered Arensky's most important composition; his other works are hardly noticed today. At the request of his publisher, Arensky created a variant of the quartet for the conventional instrumentation of two violins, viola and cello, which did not catch on, as well as a piano variant for four hands. Arensky also arranged the second movement for string orchestra as Variations on a Theme by Tchaikovsky, Op. 35a.
