= Heidelberg-Ziegelhausen =

District of Heidelberg, Germany

Coordinates: 49°25′06″N 8°45′24″E

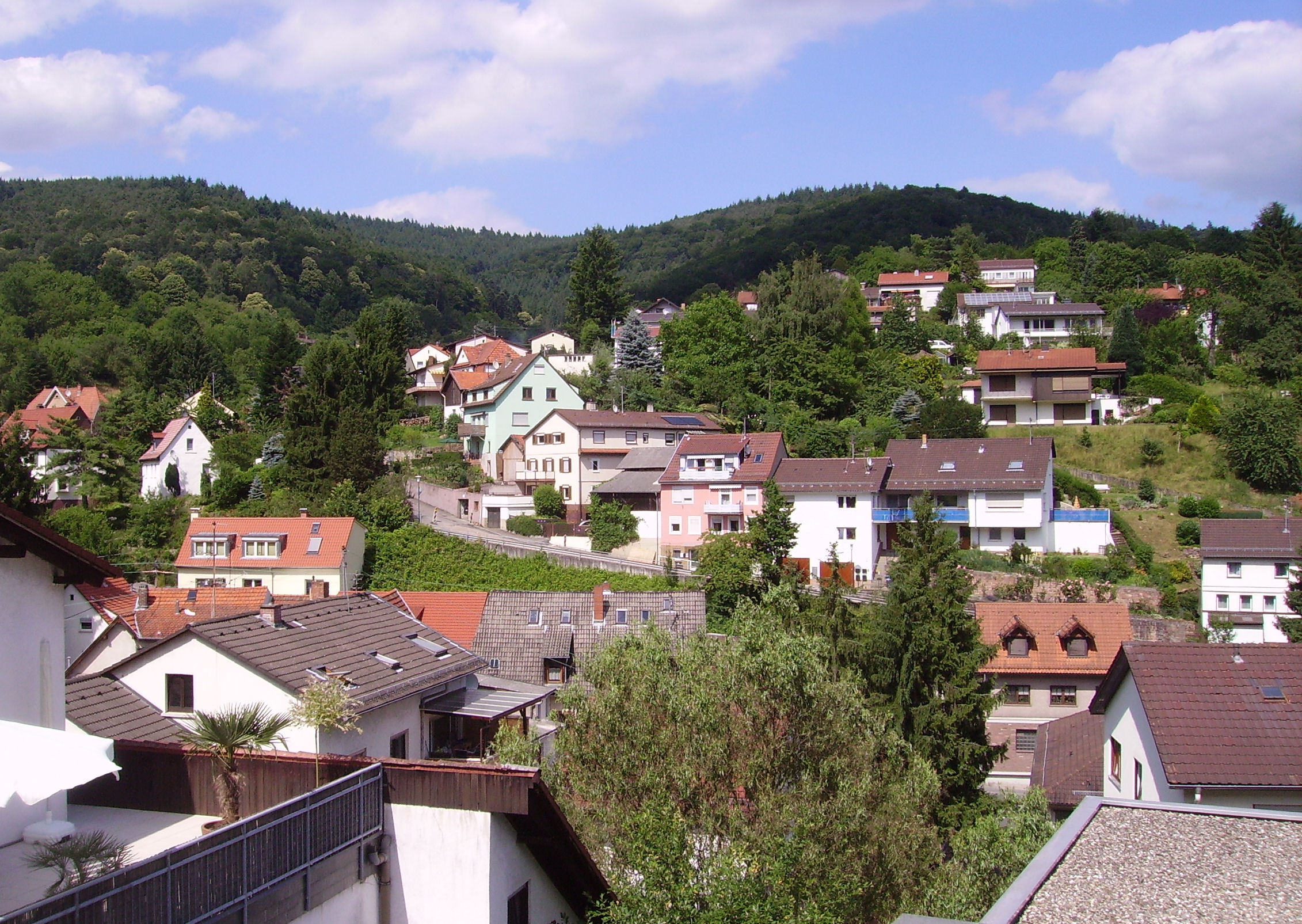
Ziegelhausen

Heidelberg-Ziegelhausen is one of the 14 residential districts of Heidelberg, Germany. It is located at the northeastern perimeter of the city.

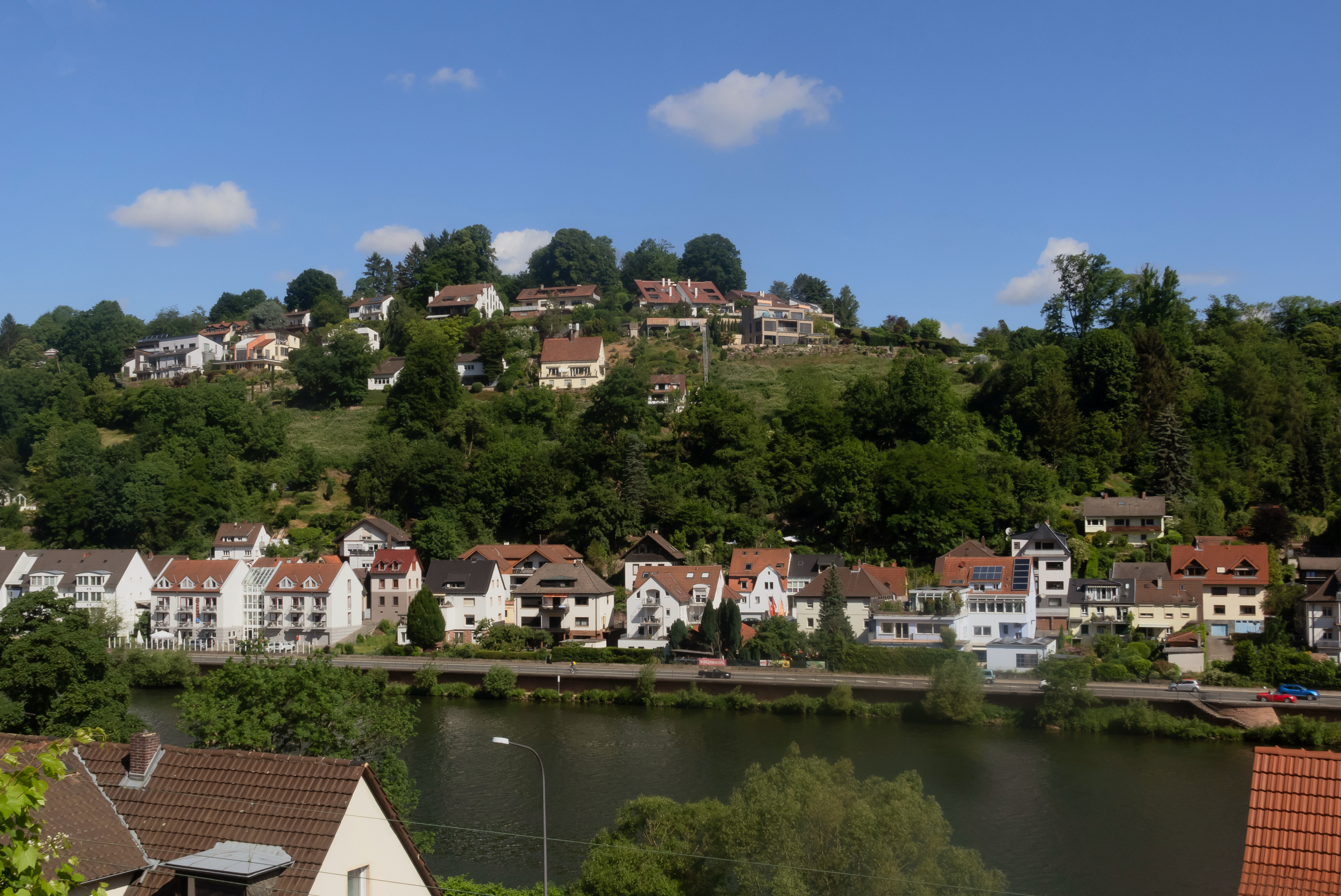
Ziegelhausen and the Neckar

Ziegelhausen lies on the northern banks of the Neckar River and extends northward into the Odenwald Forest. It has a small shopping district but is dominated by mainly single-family and some multiple-family houses.

Ziegelhausen's abundant supply of water and steep, south-facing slopes made it a center of the Neckar Valley laundry trade in the 18th and 19th centuries. Johannes Brahms summered in Ziegelhausen during the 1880s.

Ziegelhausen has several small parks, including one that features a playground of Niki de Saint-Phalle-inspired tile sculptures.

Its name means in English house of bricks, and can be attributed to a brick factory that was built there before anyone lived there. The factory is no longer in use.

The symbol of Ziegelhausen is a house with red clay roof shingles. It is on local teams' shirt for most sports.
