= Wieselburg =

Wieselburg Wieslbuag
- Municipality
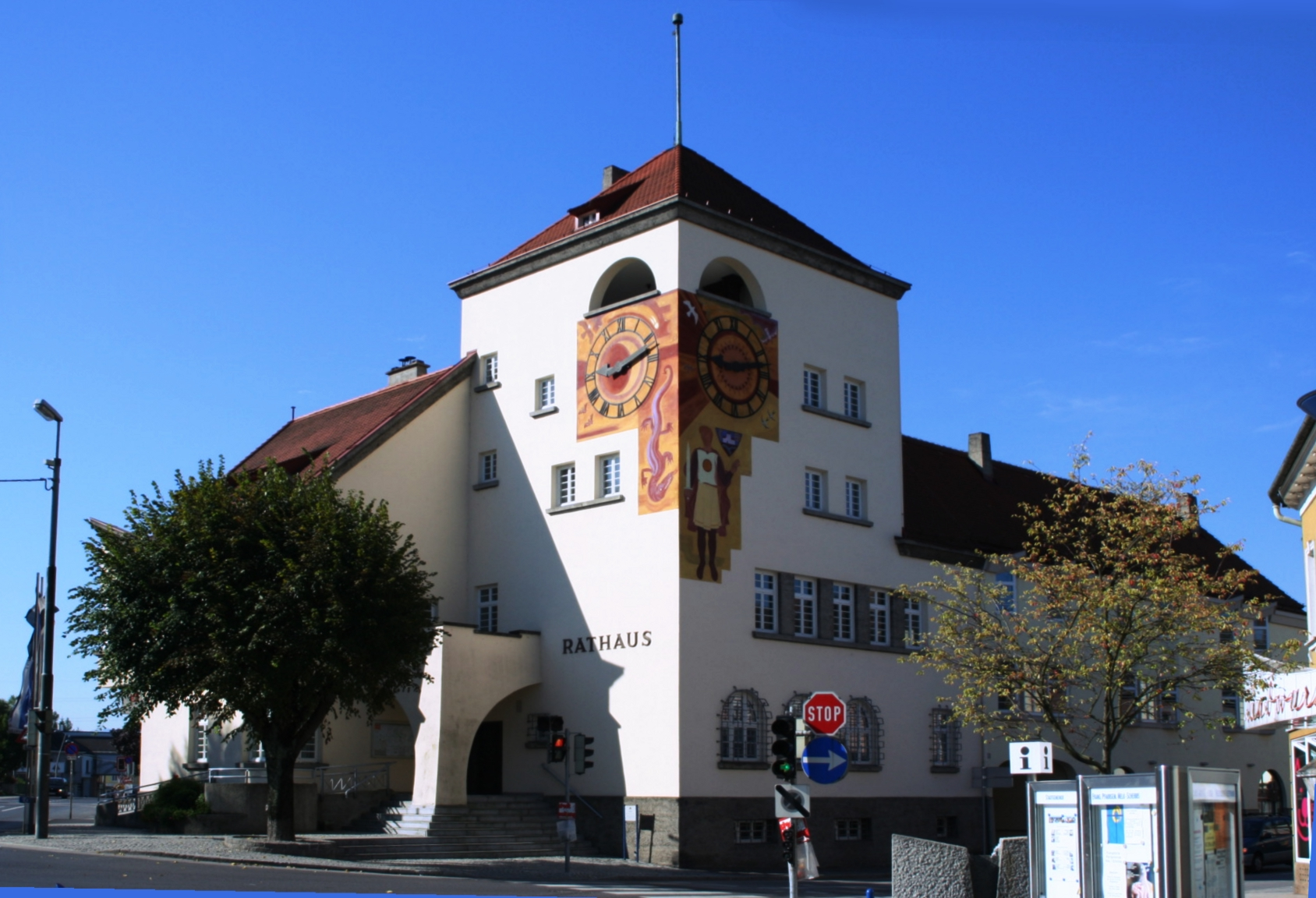
- Town hall

- Coat of arms

- Location within Austria
- Coordinates: 48°08′00″N 15°08′20″E
- Country: Austria
- State: Lower Austria
- District: Scheibbs

Government
  - Mayor: Josef Leitner (SPÖ)

Area
  - Total: 5.43 km^{2} (2.10 sq mi)
- Elevation: 269 m (883 ft)

Population (2021-01-01)
  - Total: 4,408
  - Density: 812/km^{2} (2,100/sq mi)
- Time zone: UTC+1 (CET)
  - Summer (DST): UTC+2 (CEST)
- Postal code: 3250
- Area code: 07416
- Vehicle registration: SB
- Website: www.wieselburg.at

Wieselburg (Austrian German pronunciation: [ˈviːsl̩bʊrɡ]; Central Bavarian: Wieslbuag) is a town in Lower Austria, Austria, located near the River Erlauf. Its name roughly translates to castle where two rivers meet, as there are two rivers that run together to create the Erlauf. Its population is approximately 4,200 (including surrounding villages).

A brewery, an agricultural college and research institute (HBLFA Francisco Josephinum), a college of higher education (Fachhochschule), and one of the oldest churches north of the Alps dating from AD 976 are located in the town. Wieselburg was made a town 1000 years later, in 1976. Annually in the ending of June beginning of July an agricultural fair, Wieselburger Messe, takes place.

== Population ==
Historical population
Year	Pop.	±%
1869	951	—
1880	1,011	+6.3%
1890	1,152	+13.9%
1900	1,613	+40.0%
1910	1,874	+16.2%
1923	2,094	+11.7%
1934	2,128	+1.6%
1939	2,076	−2.4%
1951	2,292	+10.4%
1961	2,555	+11.5%
1971	2,853	+11.7%
1981	3,042	+6.6%
1991	3,095	+1.7%
2001	3,498	+13.0%
2011	3,708	+6.0%

== People ==
- Karl Bienenstein (de)
- Alfred Gusenbauer, educated here
- Paul Hörbiger (de)
- Eugen Wüster (de)
