= Piano Trio (Tchaikovsky) =

Piano trio by Pyotr Ilyich Tchaikovsky

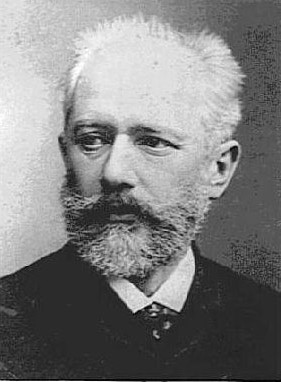
Pyotr Ilyich Tchaikovsky c. 1875

Pyotr Ilyich Tchaikovsky's Piano Trio in A minor, Op. 50, was written in Rome between December 1881 and late January 1882. It is subtitled À la mémoire d’un grand artiste [In memory of a great artist], in reference to Nikolai Rubinstein, his close friend and mentor, who had died on 23 March 1881. It is scored for piano, violin, and cello.

The work's first version was completed by late January 1882. Private performances were held in March and April. The work underwent considerable revision before its premiere on 30 October at a quartet concert of the Russian Musical Society in Moscow. The players at the performance were Sergei Taneyev (piano), Jan Hřímalý (violin), and Wilhelm Fitzenhagen (cello).

== Structure ==
The piece is marked by a tragic perspective and is in two movements:

1. Pezzo elegiaco (Moderato assai – Allegro giusto) (in A minor) (approx 20:00)
2. (A) Tema con variazioni: Andante con moto (in E major) – (B) Variazione finale e coda (in A major – A minor) (approx 27:00)

Total timing: approx. 47:00 The variations are as follows:

- Var I
- Var II: Più mosso
- Var III: Allegro moderato
- Var IV: L'istesso tempo (Allegro moderato)
- Var V: L'istesso tempo
- Var VI: Tempo di Valse
- Var VII: Allegro moderato
- Var VIII: Fuga (Allegro moderato)
- Var IX: Andante flebile, ma non tanto
- Var X: Tempo di mazurka
- Var XI: Moderato
- Variazioni finale e coda: Allegro risoluto e con fuoco
- Coda: Andante con moto – Lugubre (L'istesso tempo)

The Pezzo elegiaco is a darkly brooding and rather conventional romantic first movement with a beautiful opening cello solo with a theme that returns for a final funeral march.

The second movement is rather more unusual: it opens with an almost classical melody, much like Tchaikovsky's Variations on a Rococo Theme for cello, and then proceeds with an assured set of variations, also like the Rococo Variations. After working itself into more and more ecstatic heights culminating with the final variation, it suddenly goes through a surprising modulation to the original minor key, and the theme from the first movement returns with an even greater gravity, and the entire piece concludes with yet another death march.

== Background ==
This was the only work Tchaikovsky ever wrote for the combination of piano, violin, and cello. In 1880, his benefactress Nadezhda von Meck, had asked for such a piece, but he refused, saying in his letter to her of 5 November 1880:

You ask why I have never written a trio. Forgive me, dear friend; I would do anything to give you pleasure, but this is beyond me ... I simply cannot endure the combination of piano with violin or cello. To my mind the timbre of these instruments will not blend ... it is torture for me to have to listen to a string trio or a sonata of any kind for piano and strings. To my mind, the piano can be effective in only three situations: alone, in context with the orchestra, or as accompaniment, i.e., the background of a picture.

A year later, he composed the piano trio without being asked to do so, when any number of other genres or instrumental combinations were also available to him.

In a letter to von Meck of 27 December 1881, he again referred to his "antipathy for this combination of instruments". He wrote: "... in spite of this antipathy, I am thinking of experimenting with this sort of music, which so far I have not touched. I have already written the start of a trio. Whether I shall finish it and whether it will come out successfully I do not know, but I would like very much to bring what I have begun to a successful conclusion ... I won't hide from you the great effort of will required to set down my musical ideas in this new and unusual form. But I should like to overcome all these difficulties ...

He completed his rough sketches on 20 January 1882, and completed the scoring by 25 January. On that day he wrote to von Meck again: "The Trio is finished ... now I can say with some conviction that my work is not all bad. But I am afraid, having written all my life for orchestra, and only taken late in life to chamber music, I may have failed to adapt the instrumental combinations to my musical thoughts. In short, I fear I may have arranged music of a symphonic character as a trio, instead of writing directly for the instruments. I have tried to avoid this, but I am not sure whether I have been successful."

He put the finishing touches to the Trio by 9 February (the score is annotated "Rome 28 January – 9 February 1882"), and sent it to his publishers on 11 February, asking that Sergei Taneyev appear as piano soloist at the first performance. Taneyev, the cellist Wilhelm Fitzenhagen and the violinist Jan Hřímalý were given access to the score, and they made a number of suggestions for improvement, which Tchaikovsky accepted.

A private performance with the above-named soloists was held at the Moscow Conservatory on 23 March, the first anniversary of Nikolai Rubinstein's death, while Tchaikovsky was in Italy. He returned to Russia in April and heard the Trio for the first time, at another private performance, after which he made revisions. These included inserting a break before the Andante coda and rewriting the piano part in the Finale. Taneyev also rewrote Variation VIII, a change Tchaikovsky approved.

== Notable performances ==
The work was performed during Tchaikovsky's visit to the United States in 1891, at a reception for the composer at the Russian embassy in Washington, D.C.

Martha Argerich, Gidon Kremer, and Mischa Maisky recorded a version that one critic called "music making on a cosmic scale...performances of shattering intensity, improvisational spontaneity, and Herculean grandeur."

== Other uses ==
Music from the second movement was used for John Taras' 1948 ballet Designs with Strings.
