= Fitzenhagen =

Fitzenhagen is a German language surname.

== List of people with the surname ==
- Heather Fitzenhagen (born 1960), American politician
- Wilhelm Fitzenhagen (1848–1890), German musician

== See also ==
- Fitz
- Hagen (surname)
- String Quartet (Fitzenhagen)
