= String Quartet No. 2 (Tchaikovsky) =

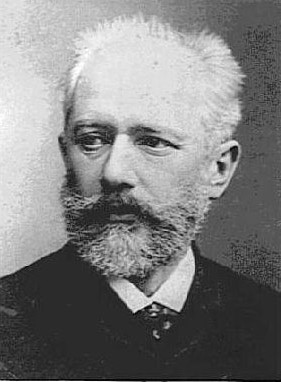
Pyotr Ilyich Tchaikovsky c. 1875

The String Quartet No. 2 in F major, Op. 22, by Pyotr Ilyich Tchaikovsky, was composed between December 1873 and January 1874. It premiered on 22 March 1874.

In October 1874, Tchaikovsky got on record as considering it his finest work: "I regard it as my best work; no other piece has poured forth from me so simply and easily. I wrote it almost at one sitting." (from letter to his brother Modest, quoted in reference). Also, later (quoted in the chapter '1879-1881'), "I wrote that music (Vakula) with affection and with delight, just as I did... the Second Quartet" (from letter to Nadezhda von Meck, ibid).

== Structure ==
The string quartet is in four movements:

1. Adagio – Moderato assai, quasi andantino (F major)
2. Allegro giusto (D♭ major)
3. Andante ma non tanto (F minor)
4. Allegro con moto (F major)

The first movement starts with an 18-bar slow introduction without key signature in 6/8 time, with the character almost of a cadenza with increasingly rococo embellishment. This leads to the main body in 4/4 time.

The second movement is in a mixed meter. It mostly follows a pattern of 2 bars of 6/8 + 1 bar of 9/8 pattern, occasionally augmented to 3+1 and 4+1. After that, there is a A major middle section in 3/4 marked l'istesso tempo, followed by a return to the asymmetrical 2+1 complex tempo. As tension mounts at the end, the pattern is stretched to 14+1.

The third movement is in 3/4 time with a middle section marked pochissimo più moto.

The fourth movement is in 3/4 and is relatively uncomplicated.

== Premiere and reports of its reception ==
From reference (page 83): ‘The Quartet Op 22 was played by F. Laub, I. Grjymali, V. Fitzenhagen, and Y.-G. Gerber, at A. Rubinstein’s house. According to Kashkin, Rubinstein "with his usual bluntness declared that the style was not that of chamber music and that he could not understand it". The performers and other guests- Kashkin, Hubert, and Albrecht- were delighted with it.’

Also (ibid, p88) ‘Modest Tchaikovsky wrote a long letter to his brother on 24 October 1874, after having heard a rehearsal of the second quartet at the Davydovs and the first public performance. At the rehearsal Davydov said it was Tchaikovsky’s best work; Auer said that it had the force of Beethoven (according to Modest the only composer many Russians would listen to); Malozemova wanted to send a congratulatory telegram. During rehearsal Auer and Davydov disagreed over the tempo of the Scherzo, the former wanting it faster, the latter slower. In the end Davydov’s views prevailed and Modest found the slower tempo at the concert less than convincing. However, the slow movement was played marvellously, so that some of the audience called out ‘bis’ at its conclusion. The finale was absolutely convincing. Modest heard Rimsky-Korsakov unreservedly praising the work to Cui, as also the Grand Duke Konstantin Nikolaievich to whom it was dedicated, and Count Litke.’

Tchaikovsky replied to Modest in a letter (29 October 1874): "I am glad that you, Malozemova and all those who sympathise, liked my quartet; I regard it as my best composition; none of my works flowed out of me so simply and easily. I wrote it practically at one go and was astonished that the public did not like it, for I find that compositions written spontaneously have every chance of success."
