= Lillian Spencer =

Lillian Spencer may refer to:

- Lillian Spencer (Coronation Street), a character on Coronation Street
- Lillian White Spencer (1876–1953), Colorado poet
