= String Quartet in D minor =

String Quartet in D minor may refer to:

- No. 2 of the String Quartets, Op. 76 (Haydn)
- String Quartet No. 13 (Mozart)
- String Quartet No. 15 (Mozart)
- String Quartet No. 14 (Schubert)
- String Quartet No. 3 (Spohr)
- String Quartet No. 2 (Smetana)
- String Quartet No. 9 (Dvořák)
- String Quartet (Fitzenhagen)
- String Quartet No. 1 (Schoenberg)
- String Quartet in D minor (Sibelius)
- String Quartet No. 6 (Bartók)
