= String Quartet No. 1 (Tchaikovsky) =

Composition for string quartet by Pyotr Ilyich Tchaikovsky

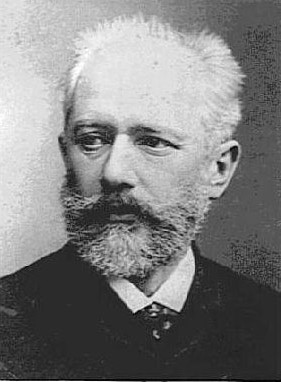
Pyotr Ilyich Tchaikovsky c. 1875

Pyotr Ilyich Tchaikovsky's String Quartet No. 1 in D major Op. 11 was the first of his three completed string quartets that were published during his lifetime. An earlier attempt had been abandoned after the first movement was completed.

Composed in February 1871, it was premiered in Moscow on 16/28 March 1871 by four members of the Russian Musical Society: Ferdinand Laub and Ludvig Minkus, violins; Pryanishnikov, viola; and Wilhelm Fitzenhagen, cello. Tchaikovsky arranged the second movement for cello and string orchestra in 1888.

== Structure ==
The quartet has four movements:

1. Moderato e semplice (D major)
2. Andante cantabile (B♭ major)
3. Scherzo. Allegro non tanto e con fuoco – Trio (D minor)
4. Finale. Allegro giusto – Allegro vivace (D major)

=== II. Andante cantabile ===
II. Andante cantabile, arranged for cello and string orchestra
Performed in 2022

The melancholic second movement, which has become famous in its own right, was based on a folk song the composer heard at his sister Aleksandra her family, the Davydov's house at Kamenka in Ukraina whistled by a house painter.

When the quartet was performed at a tribute concert for Leo Tolstoy in 1876, the author was said to have been brought to tears by this movement: “…Tolstoy, sitting next to me and listening to the Andante of my First Quartet, burst into tears".

When the Zoellner Quartet, at her request, performed the second movement for Helen Keller, who rested her fingertips on a resonant tabletop to sense the vibrations, she, too, reacted strongly. She quickly sensed the musical vibrations, swaying in time, alternately crying and smiling. Afterward, Keller reacted as follows:

When you play to me I see and hear and feel many things that I cannot easily put into words. I feel the sweep and surge and mighty pulse of life. Oh, you are masters of a wondrous art, subtle and superfine. When you play to me immediately a miracle is wrought, sight is given the blind, and deaf ears hear sweet, strange sounds.

Each note is a picture, a fragrance, the flash of a wing, a lovely girl with pearls in her hair, a group of exquisite children dancing and swinging garlands of flowers—a bright mingling of colors and twinkling feet. There are notes that laugh and kiss and sigh and melt together. And notes that weep and rage and fly apart like shattered crystal.

But mostly the violins sing of lovely things—woods and streams and sun-kissed hills, the faint sound of tiny creatures flitting about in the grass and under the petals of the flowers, the noiseless stirring of shadows in my garden, and the soft breathings of shy things that light on my hand for an instant, or touch my hair with their wings. O, yes! and a thousand, thousand other things that I cannot describe come thronging through my soul when the Zoellner Quartet plays to me.

The melody from second theme of the Andante cantabile, in D♭ major, was used as the basis for the popular song "On the Isle of May", popularized by Connee Boswell in 1940. This movement ends with plagal cadence.
