= String Quartet in E-flat minor =

String Quartet in E-flat minor may refer to:

- String Quartet No. 3 (Tchaikovsky)
- String Quartet No. 15 (Shostakovich)
