= Charles Sanford Skilton =

American composer, teacher and musicologist

Charles Sanford Skilton (August 16, 1868 – March 12, 1941) was an American composer, teacher and musicologist. Along with Charles Wakefield Cadman, Blair Fairchild, Arthur Nevin, and Arthur Farwell, among others, he was one of the leading Indianist composers of the early twentieth century.

== Life ==
Skilton was born in Northampton, Massachusetts, and received his Bachelor of Arts degree from Yale University in 1889. From that year until 1891 he taught languages at a preparatory school in Newburgh, New York; while there, he studied composition with Dudley Buck and organ with Harry Rowe Shelley. Skilton traveled to Berlin for further study in 1891, remaining there until 1893 and studying at the Hochschule für Musik with Woldemar Bargiel and Otis Boise. Returning to the United States, he became director of music at the Salem Academy and College in Winston-Salem, North Carolina, in which position he served until 1896. In 1897 he found work as an instructor of piano and music theory at the State Normal School in Trenton, New Jersey (now The College of New Jersey); he moved west in 1903, when he became a professor of organ, theory and history at the University of Kansas. He served as the Dean of the School of Fine Arts at that institution from 1903 until 1915. It was there that he developed his interest in American Indian music.

Skilton died in Lawrence, Kansas in 1941.

== Music ==
Skilton first became interested in the music of American Indians in 1915, when George La Mere, an Indian pupil of his offered a trade; the pupil would sing him traditional tribal songs in exchange for lessons in harmony. Skilton expressed interest, and soon found himself visiting the nearby Haskell Institute. The first works he completed on Indian themes were Two Indian Dances for string quartet, Deer Dance and War Dance, originally intended for a student opera. These he later orchestrated as the first part of his Suite Primeval; the second part, published four years later, consisted of four movements based on traditional songs of three tribes. These were:

- Sunrise Song, from the Winnebago
- Gambling Song, from the Rogue River
- Flute Serenade, from the Sioux
- Moccasin Game, from the Winnebago

Skilton also wrote operas on Indian themes. The three-act Kalopin was based on legends of the Chickasaw and Choctaw tribes, and took as its subject the 1812 New Madrid earthquake. This opera, though completed in 1927, was not publicly performed, but a one-act opera, The Sun Bride (to a libretto by Lillian White Spencer), was given on NBC in 1930. This piece is based on Pueblo themes, and incorporates themes from the Winnebago and Chippewa. For his work on Kalopin, Skilton was awarded the Bispham Memorial Medal Award by the American Opera Association of Chicago, Illinois.

Besides his work on Indian motives, Skilton wrote music on other themes, including incidental music for a production of Sophocles' Electra at Smith College in his youth. Among his other compositions were an oratorio, The Guardian Angel, and numerous orchestral works.

Many of Skilton's manuscript scores, and published copies of some of his work, are held in the library of the University of Kansas. Among these are manuscript copies of his three operas.

== Recordings ==
Little of Skilton's music appears to have been recorded. Some of his piano pieces, including a solo piano arrangement of the "War Dance" from "Suite Primeval," (possibly the arrangement by Carl A. Preyer referenced in the full score of Suite Primeval) may be found in two compilations of Indianist music released by Naxos Records on the Marco Polo label. During the acoustic era, Columbia Phonograph Company issued Part I of the suite, "Deer Dance" and "War Dance," played by a house orchestra on A6131; the orchestral score of the Suite Primeval indicates that Pathé Freres Phonograph Company published an acoustic orchestral recording of the same movements and that Columbia published the "Flute Serenade" as well. Part I would again appear on record during the mono LP era as recorded by the Philharmonia Orchestra of Hamburg conducted by Hans-Jurgen Walther on MGM E-3141. Individual recordings of the "War Dance" included an acoustically recorded Edison diamond disc, no. 80692, performed by its dedicatee, the Zoellner Quartet, and electrically recorded 78 RPM issue in which Howard Hanson led the Eastman-Rochester Symphony Orchestra, Victor red seal no. 11-8302, coupled with the "Sunrise Dance" from Part II. Thus, leaving aside questions of varying recording technology and accessibility to modern listeners, recordings have at least documented the "War Dance" in all three guises: solo piano, string quartet, and full orchestral.
