= String Quartet No. 3 (Tchaikovsky) =

- by Pyotr Ilyich Tchaikovsky
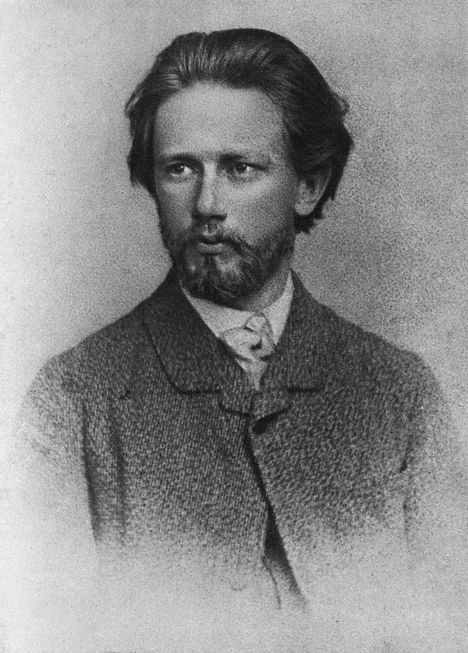
- Tchaikovsky in 1874
- Key: E♭ minor
- Opus: 30
- Composed: 1876
- Dedication: Ferdinand Laub
- Performed: 2 March 1876
- Duration: 37 minutes
- Movements: Four

The String Quartet No. 3 in E♭ minor, Op. 30, by Pyotr Ilyich Tchaikovsky, was composed in 1876, and is the last of his three string quartets. It was written as a memorial for Ferdinand Laub. (The date upon the manuscript is early February 1876.)

The quartet was performed for the first time at a party at Nikolai Rubinstein's apartment on March 2, 1876. The first public performance was at a concert on 30 March (new style/March 18 (old style), the performers being: Jan Hřímalý and Adolph Brodsky, violins; Yuly Gerber, viola; and Wilhelm Fitzenhagen, cello.

Once, while Tchaikovsky was staying with some friends, they surprised him by bringing in a string quartet who performed this quartet for him. When they finished playing, Tchaikovsky remarked, "At first I didn't much like the Finale, but now I see that it is quite good."

Recently, it was featured in the downloadable content Left Behind for the 2013 video game The Last of Us.

== Structure ==
The work is in four movements and is approximately 37 minutes long.

1. Andante sostenuto (E♭ minor, 6/8) – Allegro moderato (E♭ minor, 3/4)
2. Allegretto vivo e scherzando (B♭ major, 2/4)
3. Andante funebre e doloroso, ma con moto (E♭ minor, 4/4)
4. Finale: Allegro non troppo e risoluto (E♭ major, 2/4)

The Andante funebre was originally intended to be the second movement, with the Allegretto vivo e scherzando as the third, but Tchaikovsky later decided to switch them.
