= Designs with Strings =

Ballet by John Taras

Designs with Strings, also Designs for Strings (French: Dessins pour six or pour les six; Danish: Variationer), is a ballet choreographed by John Taras to music from the second movement of Tschaikovsky's Trio in A minor. It was first performed on 6 February 1948 in Edinburgh by the Metropolitan Ballet.

== Sources ==
- The Oxford Dictionary of Dance (p.131), Debra Craine, Judith Mackrell, 2nd ed 2010 ISBN 9780199563449]
