= Sergei Nakariakov =

Russian trumpeter (born 1977)

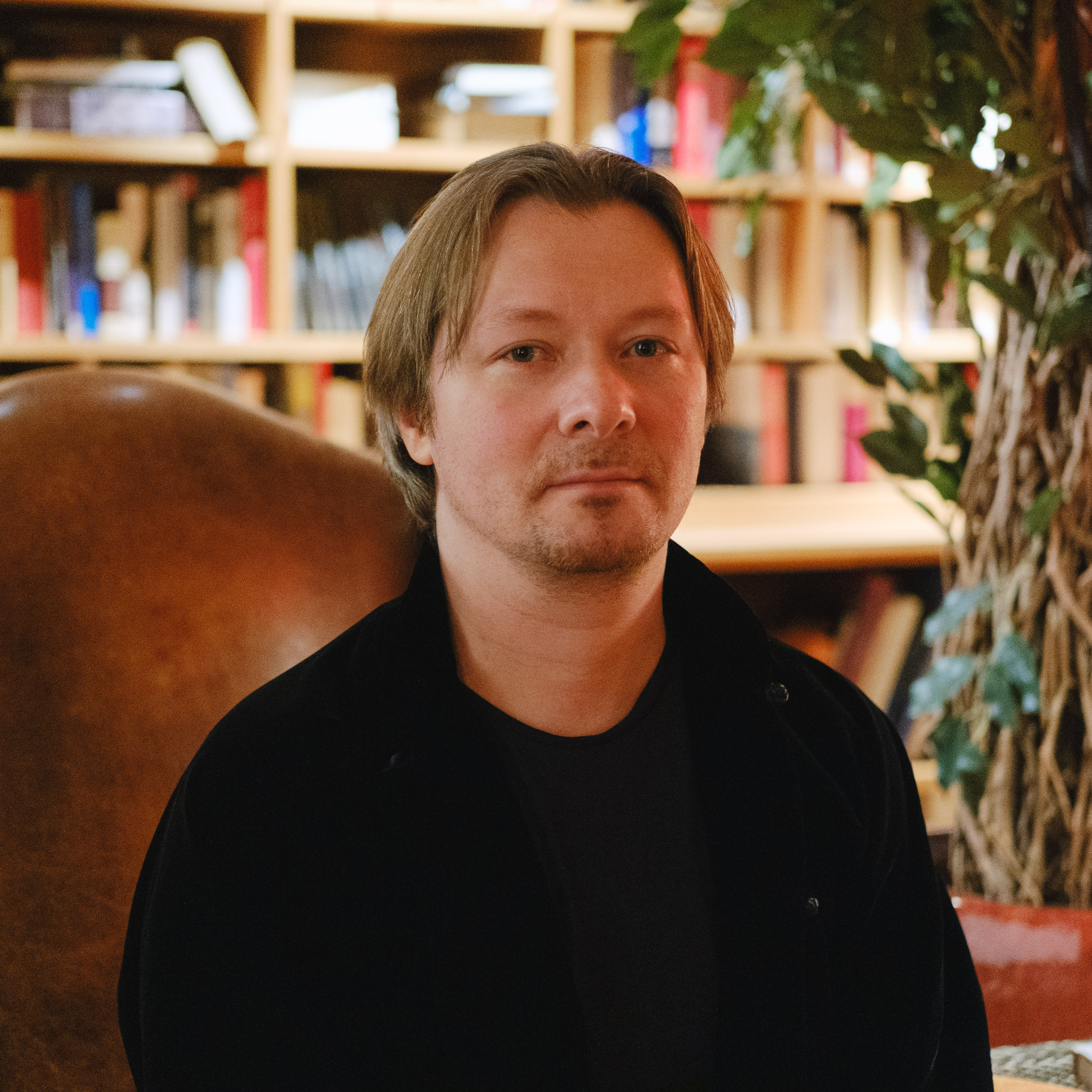
- Nakariakov in 2019

Background information
- Born: 10 May 1977 (age 49); Gorky, Russian SFSR, Soviet Union
- Genres: Classical
- Occupations: Trumpeter, flugelhorn player
- Instruments: Trumpet, flugelhorn
- Labels: Teldec, Warner Classics, EMI Classics, Luiza Records
- Website: www.nakariakov.info

Sergei Mikhailovich Nakariakov (Russian: Серге́й Михайлович Накаряков;; born 10 May 1977) is a Russian-Israeli classical trumpet and flugelhorn player. Born in Gorky, he came to international attention as a young performer in the early 1990s and has been noted for expanding the concert repertoire of the trumpet and flugelhorn through transcriptions, commissions and recordings.

== Early life and career ==
Nakariakov was born in Gorky, Soviet Union. He began musical studies on the piano at the age of six, but after a spinal injury in 1986 he changed to the trumpet. His father, Mikhail Nakariakov, supported the transition and later made many of the transcriptions that became part of his repertoire. From the age of ten he performed with orchestras in major concert halls of the Soviet Union.

His international career began in the early 1990s. In 1991 he appeared at the Ivo Pogorelich Festival in Bad Wörishofen and made his debut at the Salzburg Festival with the Lithuanian Chamber Orchestra under Saulius Sondeckis. In 1992 he appeared at the Schleswig-Holstein Musik Festival, where he received the Prix Davidoff. In 1992, at the age of 15, he released his first CD recording, which included works by Maurice Ravel, George Gershwin and Arban's The Carnival of Venice.

In 1993 and 1994, Nakariakov studied with the French trumpeter Guy Touvron at the Conservatoire National de Région in Paris. His early career included appearances in Europe, Asia, North America and South America, and performances at venues including the Hollywood Bowl, Lincoln Center, the Royal Festival Hall and the Royal Albert Hall.

== Orchestras and conductors ==
Nakariakov has appeared with orchestras including the Lithuanian Chamber Orchestra, the Saint Paul Chamber Orchestra, the Philharmonia Orchestra, the St. Petersburg Philharmonic Orchestra, the Moscow Virtuosi, the Russian National Orchestra, the London Philharmonic Orchestra, the Israel Philharmonic Orchestra, the Gürzenich Orchestra Cologne, the Deutsches Symphonie-Orchester Berlin, the Münchner Philharmoniker, the Orchestre de Paris, the Orchestre National de France, the NHK Symphony Orchestra, the Tokyo Philharmonic Orchestra, the Sydney Symphony Orchestra, the Bergen Philharmonic Orchestra, the Oslo Philharmonic, the Royal Stockholm Philharmonic Orchestra, the Finnish Radio Symphony Orchestra, the Bamberg Symphony and the Sofia Philharmonic Orchestra.

Conductors with whom he has worked in concerts or recordings include Vladimir Spivakov, Christoph Eschenbach, Yuri Bashmet, Yuri Temirkanov, Vladimir Ashkenazy, Jiří Bělohlávek, Dmitry Sitkovetsky, Sir Neville Marriner, Kent Nagano, Mikhail Pletnev, Sakari Oramo, Valery Gergiev, Hugh Wolff and Nayden Todorov, among others.

== Repertoire and collaborations ==
Nakariakov's repertoire includes the standard trumpet literature as well as transcriptions of works originally written for other instruments. These have included adaptations of concertos and solo works by Joseph Haydn, Johann Nepomuk Hummel, Wolfgang Amadeus Mozart, Pyotr Ilyich Tchaikovsky, Max Bruch, Camille Saint-Saëns, Felix Mendelssohn, George Gershwin and others.

He has also performed and recorded music written for him or associated with his expansion of the trumpet and flugelhorn repertoire. His repertoire includes commissions and works by composers such as Peter Ruzicka, Uri Brener, Enjott Schneider, Fazıl Say and Jörg Widmann. Widmann's ad absurdum, a concert piece for trumpet and orchestra, was dedicated to Nakariakov and premiered in 2006.

As a chamber musician, Nakariakov has collaborated with musicians including Vadim Repin, Martha Argerich, Mischa Maisky, Emmanuel Pahud, Julian Rachlin, Dmitry Sitkovetsky, Vera Okhotnikova and pianist Maria Meerovitch.

== Frequenza Festival ==
Nakariakov is co-artistic director, together with pianist Maria Meerovitch, of Frequenza Festival, a travelling chamber music festival. The festival presents programmes combining classical repertoire, transcriptions, contemporary perspectives, improvisation and classical-jazz fusion.

In May 2026, Frequenza Festival was presented in Bulgaria for the first time at Bulgaria Hall in collaboration with the Sofia Philharmonic. The programme included chamber concerts, a grand opening with the Sofia Philharmonic, masterclasses and a final concert featuring the festival participants. Artists associated with the Sofia edition included Barnabás Kelemen, Kevin Zhu, David Taylor, Jing Zhao, Roman Spitzer, Roland Szentpáli, Maria Meerovitch, Misha Tsiganov, Saar Berger, Boris Andrianov, Alex Sipiagin, Matthew Gee and Nakariakov.

== Recordings ==
Nakariakov has recorded for labels including Teldec, Warner Classics, EMI Classics, Sony Classical and Luiza Records. He has recorded works by composers such as Joseph Haydn, Johann Nepomuk Hummel, J. B. Neruda, Wolfgang Amadeus Mozart, Georg Philipp Telemann, Antonio Vivaldi, Felix Mendelssohn, Pyotr Ilyich Tchaikovsky, Camille Saint-Saëns, Max Bruch, George Gershwin and Jörg Widmann.

His Warner/Teldec recordings include Vivaldi, Telemann & Marcello: Baroque Trumpet Concertos with the Saint Paul Chamber Orchestra conducted by Hugh Wolff, and No Limit with the Philharmonia Orchestra conducted by Vladimir Ashkenazy. In No Limit, Nakariakov performed transcriptions including Tchaikovsky's Variations on a Rococo Theme, Saint-Saëns's Introduction and Rondo Capriccioso, Bruch's Kol Nidrei and Gershwin's Rhapsody in Blue.

Nakariakov's recordings include:

- Antonio Vivaldi, Georg Philipp Telemann and Benedetto Marcello: Baroque trumpet concertos, with the Saint Paul Chamber Orchestra conducted by Hugh Wolff
- Joseph Haydn, Franz Anton Hoffmeister and Felix Mendelssohn: concertos for trumpet
- Pyotr Ilyich Tchaikovsky: Variations on a Rococo Theme, arranged for flugelhorn and orchestra
- George Gershwin: Rhapsody in Blue, arranged for trumpet and orchestra
- Camille Saint-Saëns: Introduction and Rondo Capriccioso, arranged for trumpet and orchestra
- Max Bruch: Kol Nidrei, arranged for flugelhorn and orchestra
- Jörg Widmann: ad absurdum for trumpet and orchestra
- Élégie, with songs by Robert Schumann, Franz Schubert and others arranged for trumpet and piano
- Metamorphosis, a Luiza Records double album including chamber and orchestral works by Widmann, Schumann and Fauré

In 2002, Nakariakov received the Echo Klassik award as Instrumentalist of the Year. In 2004 he was the subject of Jan Schmidt-Garre's documentary film No More Wunderkind.

== Flugelhorn ==
Nakariakov has also made several recordings on the flugelhorn. In his album Concertos for Trumpet, he performed music transcribed from violin, viola and cello concertos. In No Limit, he played Tchaikovsky's Variations on a Rococo Theme, originally for cello and orchestra, in a transcription for flugelhorn.

He has been credited with helping to bring the flugelhorn to prominence as a concert solo instrument.

== Musical equipment ==
Nakariakov has performed on AR Resonance instruments, including the AR Resonance Nakariakov model B-flat trumpet, cornet, flugelhorn and mouthpieces. For many years he played on Courtois instruments, and in earlier years he also played a Getzen trumpet.
