= Arcade (ballet) =

Arcade is a ballet made by John Taras to Igor Stravinsky's Concerto for Piano and Winds (1924). The premiere took place Thursday, March 28, 1963, at the New York State Theater, Lincoln Center.

== Original Cast ==
- Suzanne Farrell
- Arthur Mitchell

== Articles ==
- Sunday NY Times, April 7, 1963

=== obituaries ===
- NY Times of John Taras by Anna Kisselgoff, April 5, 2004
