= Ferdinand Laub =

Czech violinist and composer

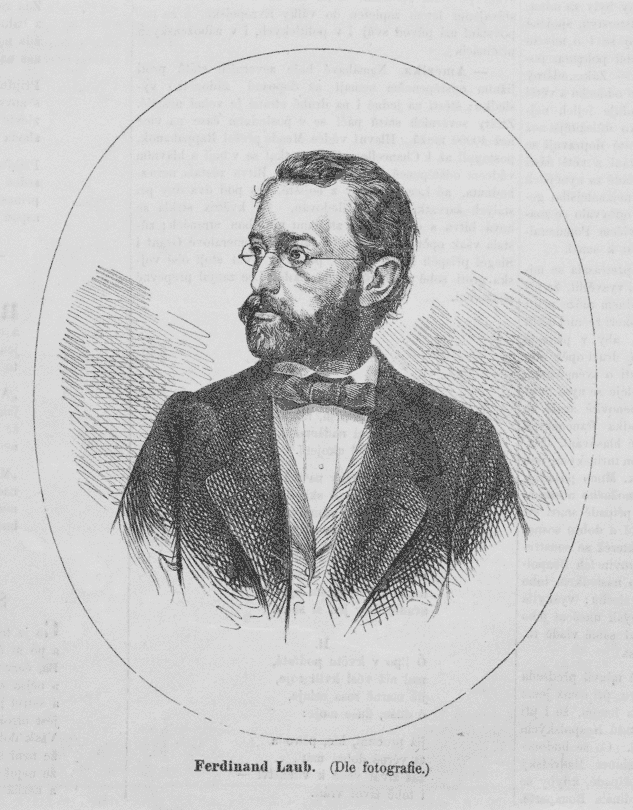
Ferdinand Laub

Ferdinand Laub (19 January 1832 – 17 March 1875) was a Czech violinist and composer.

== Life and career ==
Laub was born in Prague from a German Bohemian family which had assimilated into the ethnic Czech community. His father Erasmus (1794–1865) arranged for Ferdinand's first public appearance at age six. His first solo concert was at age ten in the Estates Theatre (a theater in Prague). From 1843 to 1846, he studied at the Prague Conservatory. He began his adult career as a virtuoso in Vienna, at the imperial court. In 1850, he traveled across Europe with a series of exhibitions. He stayed for a longer time in Weimar and Berlin (1855–62 as professor at the Stern Conservatory). From 1866 to 1874 he was professor of violin at the Moscow Conservatory, where his many notable students included Stanisław Barcewicz.

Laub was a well-admired violinist, winning awards all over Europe; Pyotr Ilyich Tchaikovsky called him "the best violinist of our time". He was the first violinist in the premiere performances of both Tchaikovsky's First and Second String Quartets, and the posthumous dedicatee of the Third of 1876. In January 1868, during Hector Berlioz's second trip to Moscow, Laub performed the solo viola part of his Harold en Italie at the Moscow Conservatory under the composer's baton.

In 1874, lung disease forced him to stop working. He was succeeded at Moscow Conservatory by Jan Hřímalý. He died on the way to a spa in Meran, in Gries-San Quirino near Bolzano, and is interred in the Vyšehrad Cemetery.

His son Váša Laub (1857–1911) was also a violinist and composer.

== Selected works ==
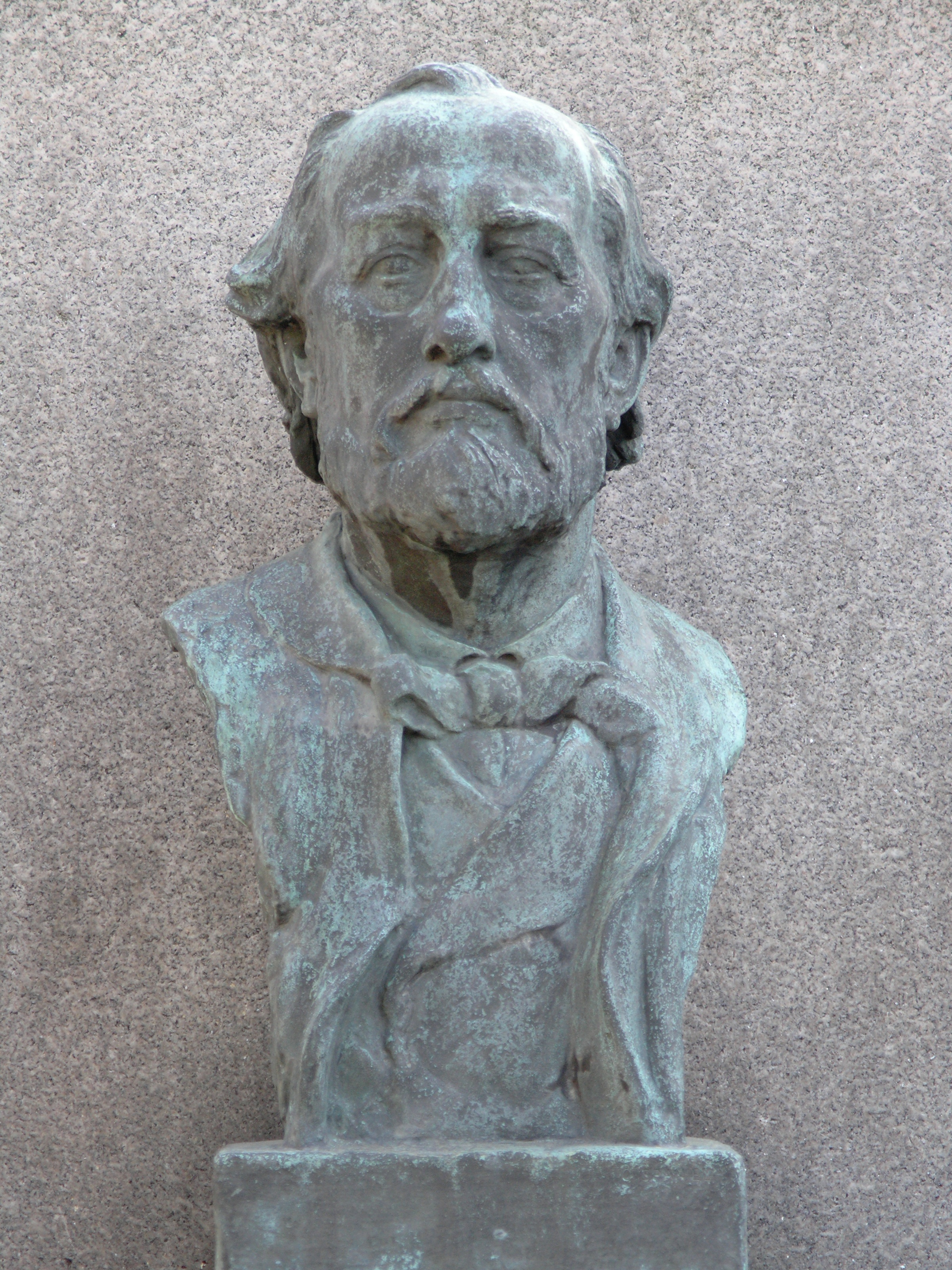
Bust of Ferdinand Laub in the Vyšehrad Cemetery

=== Concertante ===
- Cadenzas to Beethoven's Violin Concerto, Op. 61 (1859)
- Concerto in A minor for violin and orchestra; lost

=== Chamber music ===
- Élégie for violin and piano, Op. 3 (1857)
- 6 Morceaux caractéristiques for violin and piano, Op. 4 (1858)
  1. Nocturne
  2. Ballade in A minor
  3. Romance
  4. Saltarello in D minor
- Rondo scherzoso for violin and piano or orchestra, Op. 6 (1859)
- 2 Morceaux for violin and piano, Op. 7 (1861)
  1. Romance in A major
  2. Impromptu in G major
- Polonéza (Polonaise de concert) in G major for violin and piano, Op. 8 (1861) or violin and orchestra (1862)
- Velké brillantní duo na české národní písně (Grand duo brillant sur des airs bohêmes) for violin and piano (1865); co-composed with Guillaume Graf
- 4 Morceaux for violin and piano, Op. 12 (published 1884)
  1. Canzonetta in B minor
  2. Bonheur perdu
  3. Romance sans paroles (Píseň beze slov; Song without Words; Lied ohne Worte) in B♭ major
  4. Impromptu in A major
- Études de concert (3 Concert Etudes; 3 Concert-Etüden) for violin solo, Op. 13 (published 1881)
  1. Moderato in D minor
  2. Andante in C major
  3. Moderato vivace in E minor (Tarantelle aus der Stummen von Portici)
- 3 Morceaux for viola (or violin) and piano, Op. 14 (published 1883)
- Adagio for violin and piano
- Holubice od Staňka for violin and piano
- String Quartet in C♯ minor

=== Vocal ===
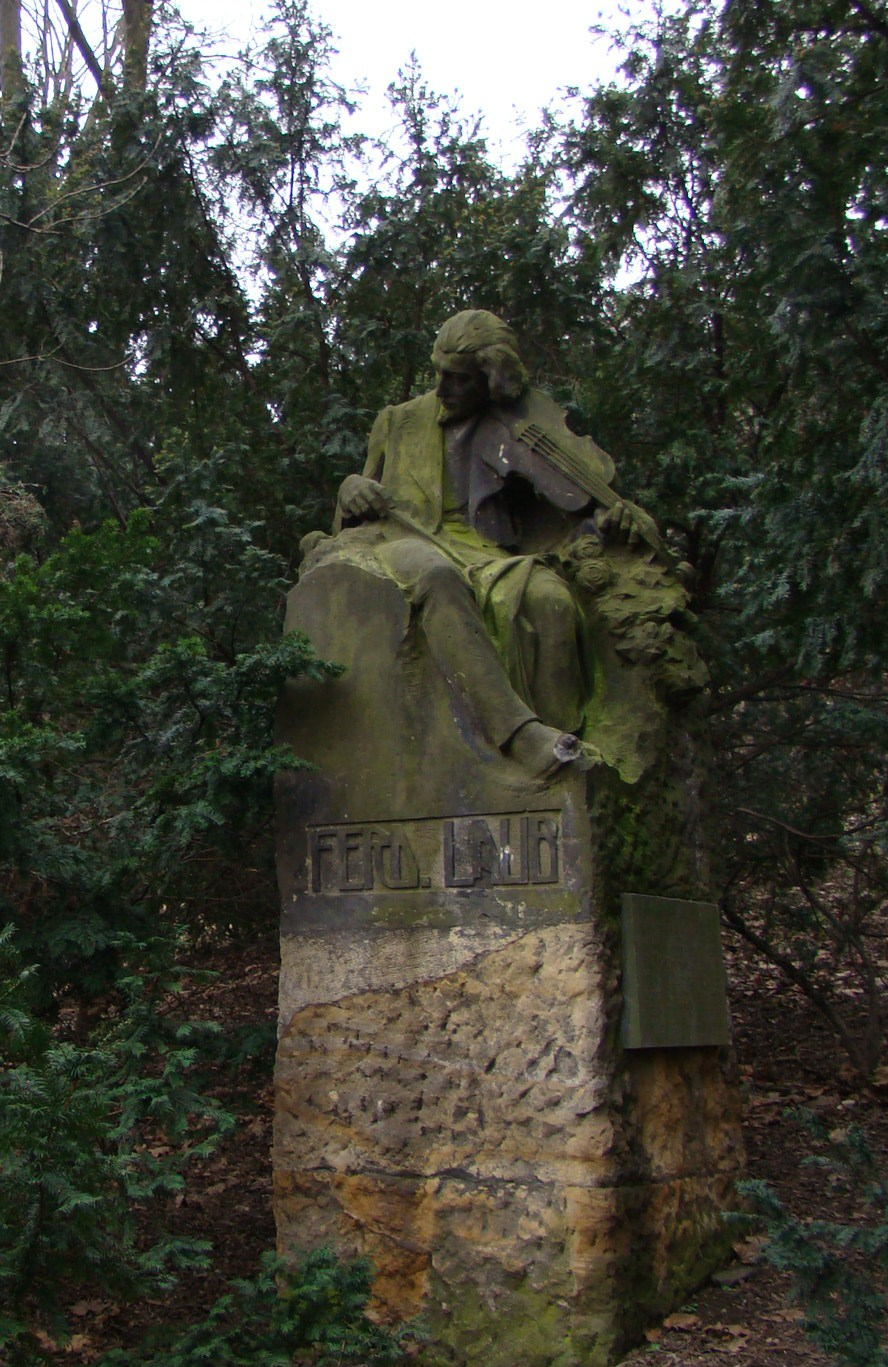
A monument to Ferdinand Laub in Prague

- České písně (Czech Songs; Böhmische Lieder) for voice and piano, Op. 2 (1857)
  1. Minka a včely (Das Minchen und die Bienen)
  2. Naděje (Hope; Hoffnung)
  3. Holubice (The Dove)
- 3 Písně (3 Songs) for voice and piano, Op. 9 (1865)
  1. Pravdu mluv
  2. České písně
  3. Až mne nebude
