= Lillian White Spencer =

American poet

Lilian White Spencer was a well-known American poet of Colorado.

== Biography ==
She was born in 1876 in Albany, New York. She was the fifth of nine children of Frederick W. and Catherine (McGurk) White. At the time of her birth, Spencer's father was a writer for and part owner of the Albany Union. He had entered the field of journalism shortly after his marriage and during the early years of his career wrote for the New York Sun and edited the Albany Express. Eventually the family left New York and moved to Denver, Colorado. Frederick White became famous in the West and throughout the country as an editorial writer, critic, and essayist for the Denver Post, under the initials F.W.W. Spencer followed her father into journalism after attending a series of French convent schools from which she graduated at age 15. She worked briefly with him at the Denver Post and later held a civic job for a few months before she married George Soule Spencer and left Denver.

During her marriage Spencer lived in New York City. Her husband was an actor, and her writing centered on the theater in the form of play reviews, script revisions, and the writing of plays. A full-length play and several one-act plays were produced. At this time she also wrote movie scenarios, many of which were accepted by the Edison and Vitagraph Companies. After the deaths of her parents, Frederick in February 1917 and Catherine in March 1918, and the end of her marriage, Spencer returned to Denver. It was at this time that she made her first attempts at verse. The subjects she wrote about most often were Indian life and Colorado. She used these themes repeatedly in her poetry, pageant writing, prose and public addresses in schools and over the radio. In addition, Spencer was interested in astronomy. She was a member of the Sociéte astronomique de France (Astronomical Society of France) and published a textbook for the Nutshell Science series of Chicago called Astronomy Without a Telescope. Some of her best known works were her translations of French poems of which more than 50 were published, many of which won awards. Spencer was best known in the Denver area as a writer of pageants. Hymn to Colorado (music by Mrs. Forrest Rutherford) was performed in April 1926 by 6,000 Denver school children. In June of the same year her Indian Prologue (music by Henry Sachs) was presented at the University of Denver. The Pageant of Colorado (music by Charles Wakefield Cadman), was presented in Denver in May 1927 with a cast of 1500, and was said to have been the largest indoor spectacle ever produced in the West. It was part of a celebration honoring the opening of the Moffat Tunnel. Finally, the Pageant of York (music by Urban Hershey), was presented in October 1927 in York, Pennsylvania. This pageant used a cast of 5000 to celebrate the 150th anniversary of the Continental Congress in York. The pageant was published in book form by the city of York and later by Dodd-Mead in their National Pageant Series (October 1929). A story in Spencer's poem Blue Feather inspired a collaboration with Charles Sanford Skilton on the opera The Sun Bride, produced by the National Broadcasting Company on April 17, 1930. The Sun Bride was also presented as a poetic drama at the Red Rocks Amphitheatre near Denver in July 1935 by Marion Parsons Robinson of the University of Denver. After 1930, Spencer's efforts turned from writing to getting poems and translations already written published in book form or republished in magazines. In 1944, she and her brother Frank E. White sold the family home at 1490 Stuart Street in Denver and moved to Oceanside, California. It was there that she died on June 23, 1953.
