= Jan Hřímalý =

Czech violinist (1844–1915)

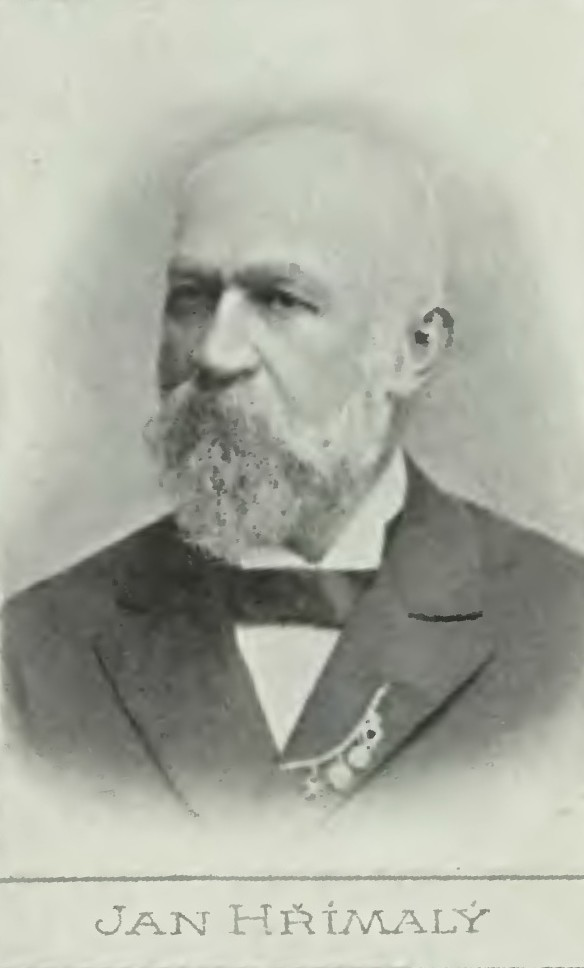
Hřímalý in 1899

Jan Hřímalý (Russian: Иван Войцехович Гржимали, romanized: Ivan Voytsekhovich Grzhimali; 13 April 1844 – 24 January [O.S. 11 January] 1915) was a Czech violinist and teacher who was associated with the Moscow Conservatory for 46 years, from 1869 to 1915.

== Biography ==
Hřímalý was born in Plzeň, Bohemia (then part of the Austrian Empire), the second son of the organist and composer Vojtěch Hřímalý (1809–1880), and a member of a notable Czech musical family. He was taught by his older brother Vojtěch Hřímalý jr., and by Moritz Mildner. Hřímalý studied violin at the Prague Conservatory (1855–1861), and went on to become leader of the Amsterdam Orchestra (1862–1868). In 1869 he was appointed violin teacher at the Moscow Conservatory. He succeeded Ferdinand Laub as professor of violin studies 1874–1915. He was leader of the Russian Musical Society Orchestra in Moscow from 1874 until 1906.

He was acquainted with Pyotr Ilyich Tchaikovsky, who held him in high regard. He co-premiered Tchaikovsky's String Quartets Nos. 2 (1874) and 3 (1876). In March 1882, he appeared in the first performance (private) of Tchaikovsky's Piano Trio in A minor and may have also appeared in the public premiere in October, although this is not certain.

He made a very early recording on wax cylinders of the Piano Trio No. 1 in D minor by Anton Arensky, with the composer at the piano and the cellist Anatoliy Brandukov. This recording was made shortly after its composition and is almost certainly its first recording, although it is not complete.

He was considered an outstanding teacher. His students included Iosif Kotek, Reinhold Glière, who dedicated his Octet for Strings, Op. 5, to his teacher; Paul Juon; Vladimir Bakaleinikov; Arcady Dubensky; Stanisław Barcewicz, Pyotr Stolyarsky (the teacher of David Oistrakh, Nathan Milstein, and many others); Nikolai Roslavets; Konstantin Saradzhev; Alexander Petschnikoff, Mikhail Press, Alexander Schmuller; and possibly Mitrofan Vasiliev, the first violin teacher of Jean Sibelius. See: List of music students by teacher: G to J#Jan Hřímalý.

He published a number of technical exercises and studies, some of which were valued by Jascha Heifetz, and he died in Moscow in 1915.

All his siblings were musically talented. Together with his brothers, Vojtěch (1842–1908), Jan Bartulomeus Čestmír (1844–1915), and Bohuslav Ferdinand Wenzl (1848–1894), they started the first string quartet in Bohemia. His sisters, Maria Regina (1839–1924) and Anna Jana (1840–1897) were renowned singers in Salzburg, Austria.
