= John Taras =

- Born: April 18, 1919; New York City, U.S.
- Died: April 2, 2004 (aged 84); New York City, U.S.
- Occupations: ballet master, choreographer
- Spouse: Hélène Sadowska
- Children: Anne (stepdaughter)

John Taras (April 18, 1919 – April 2, 2004) was an American ballet master, repetiteur, and choreographer.

== Early life and education ==
Born on the Lower East Side of New York City to Ukrainian parents, he was sent at age 16 to study ballet with Michel Fokine, Anatole Vilzak, Pierre Vladimiroff and Ludmila Shollar, and later to the School of American Ballet.

== Career ==
He first appeared professionally with Opera on Tour for which Fokine arranged dance.

He performed at the 1939 New York World's Fair with Ballet Caravan at the Ford Pavilion and joined Catherine Littlefield's Philadelphia Ballet for a 1941 tour of the southern states, and in 1942 was in the Broadway revival of J. M. Barrie's A Kiss for Cinderella. He then toured South America with American Ballet Caravan.

Taras joined Ballet Theatre in 1942 and rose to soloist. He rehearsed the ballets of Lichine, DeMille, Nijinska, Balanchine and Tudor, and in 1946 choreographed his first ballet, Graziana.

He danced the 1947 season with the Markova-Dolin Company at the Chicago Civic Opera and produced Camille for de Basil's Original Ballet Russe with Alicia Markova and Anton Dolin as the leads. Taras was principal dancer in de Basil's company and regisseur for their Covent Garden and Paris seasons. He produced The Minotaur for Ballet Society that year. In 1949 he choreographed for the experimental Ballets des Champs-Élysées.

Taras staged the Spring Symphony for the San Francisco Ballet and Designs with Strings to music of Tchaikovsky for the Metropolitan Ballet in Edinburgh in 1948, from which time until 1959 he was choreographer and balletmaster for the Grand Ballet du Marquis de Cuevas. Among the ballets he made for that company was Piège de Lumière from 1952 (which he restaged for New York City Ballet in 1964). He choreographed Fanfare for a Prince as a pièce d'occasion at the Monte-Carlo Opera for the 1956 marriage of Prince Rainier and Grace Kelly.

Balanchine invited Taras to stage La Sonnambula at New York City Ballet in 1959, where served as choreographer and ballet master until 1984; among his works for City Ballet are Ebony Concerto, Concerto for Piano and Winds, Scenes de Ballet, Song of the Nightingale and Persephone for the Stravinsky festivals; Daphnis and Chloe for the 1975 Ravel festival and Souvenir de Florence for the 1981 Tchaikovsky festival. His 1963 Stravinsky ballet, Arcade was Suzanne Farrell's first featured role, as the young girl whose budding romance with Arthur Mitchell is destroyed by a group of chaperones.

He was balletmaster of the Paris Opera Ballet 1969 to 1970, artistic director of West Berlin's Staatsballet Berlin from 1970 to 1972, staged Le Sacre du Printemps at La Scala in Milan for Natalia Makarova, and Sir Frederick Ashton's Illuminations for the Joffrey Ballet and the Royal Ballet, Covent Garden.

Taras staged his own version of The Firebird for Dance Theatre of Harlem, which was seen on PBS's live show Kennedy Center Tonight. The original cast of the ballet starred Lorraine Graves as the princess, Donald Williams as the prince, and Stephanie Dabney whose performances as the eponymous character rocketed her to stardom. Additionally Taras has staged and rehearsed Balanchine's ballets for major companies, including the premiere of the Bolshoi Ballet in a Balanchine work as part of their centenary celebration of Serge Prokofiev. Mikhail Baryshnikov asked him in 1984 to join American Ballet Theatre as associate director. During his tenure at ABT, he served as ballet master and choreographer for the company. In the wake of Baryshnikov's departure from the company, Taras resigned as well.

He died on April 2, 2004. He is survived by his wife, Hélène Sadowska, and his stepdaughter, Anne.

== Bibliography ==
- George Balanchine: Ballet Master by Richard Buckle and John Taras, Random House, New York, 1988.
