= Variations on a Rococo Theme =

1877 musical work by Pyotr Ilyich Tchaikovsky

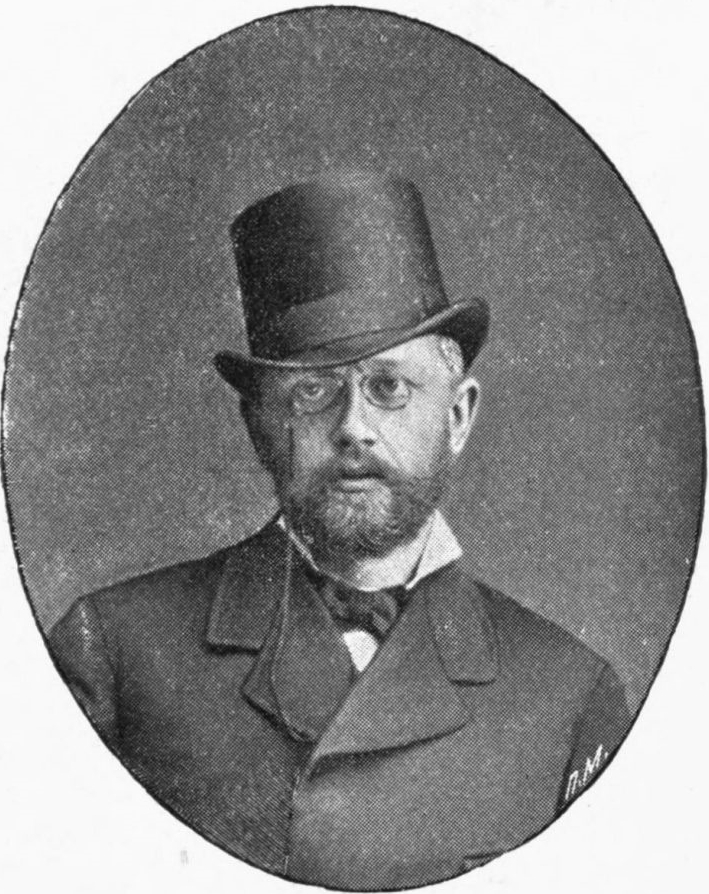
Pyotr Ilyich Tchaikovsky c. 1877

The Variations on a Rococo Theme, (Note: In French: Variations sur un thème rococo pour le violoncelle avec accompagnement d'orchestre ou de piano; in Russian: Вариации на тему рококо.) Op. 33, is a concertante work for cello and orchestra by Pyotr Ilyich Tchaikovsky. It is the closest he ever came to writing a full concerto for cello and orchestra. The style was inspired by Mozart, Tchaikovsky's role model, and makes it clear that Tchaikovsky admired the Classical style very much. However, the Theme is not Rococo in origin, but actually an original theme in the Rococo style.

Tchaikovsky wrote this piece for and with the help of Wilhelm Fitzenhagen, a German cellist and fellow-professor at the Moscow Conservatory. Fitzenhagen gave the premiere in Moscow on November 30, 1877, with Nikolai Rubinstein conducting. This was perhaps the only hearing of the Variations as Tchaikovsky wrote the piece, until 1941, when it was played in Moscow without Fitzenhagen's by-then-standard emendations.

== Orchestration ==
The piece is scored for a reduced orchestra consisting of pairs of each of the four basic woodwind instruments, two horns and the usual strings, like the typical late 18th-century orchestra without trumpets or percussion.

== Structure and overview ==
The piece is composed of a theme and eight variations (seven in Fitzenhagen's version), making up roughly 20 minutes of music. Part of the difficulty of the piece lies in this continuous and prolonged format, devoid of the usual extended orchestral tuttis allowing the soloist to rest for a few moments. The soloist is also challenged by mostly having to play in the high register using the thumb position.

1. Moderato assai quasi Andante – Thema: Moderato semplice
  The orchestra comes in with a somewhat brief (though it looks long on paper) introduction, and the solo cello states the simple, elegant theme. The theme is repeated four times, then the cello plays a brief conjunctive passage, the same exact notes of which are used to link Vars. I and II. The same conjunction is played an octave lower to link Vars. VI and VII.
2. Var. I: Tempo della Thema
  The first variation is in triplets, through the midst of which the orchestra restates the theme. The sound is lively and graceful.
3. Var. II: Tempo della Thema
  The second variation features a section of conversation between the orchestra and soloist, in which the theme nearly doubles in speed. A modified version of the aforementioned conjunction is played, where the cello quickly moves into a cadenza (similar to the Violin Concerto in the sense that both pieces contain an early cadenza), which is brazen and filled with chords, steadfastly refusing to resolve its minor key.
4. Var. III: Andante
  The third variation is a melancholy restatement of the theme in D minor and is the only minor variation in the entire piece. The conjunction again appears at the end of the variation, though this time much greatly varied in the key of D minor.
5. Var. IV: Allegro vivo
  After a brief pause, the warm A major returns, though this time much more similar in character to Var. II. This is also one of the most difficult variations of the piece, an Allegro vivo that rarely relents its constant 32nd notes. The orchestra, too, has a difficult time keeping up with its blazing speed, particularly the solo flute. Though, unlike the previous three, no conjunction appears at the end of this variation, a graceful Mannheim Rocket closes it.
6. Var. V: Andante grazioso
  Unlike the previous variations, the theme's opening pickup here becomes the downbeat. For the first time in the piece, Tchaikovsky cleverly and explicitly mixes the conjunction figure into the variation itself, concluding with a flourish and long trill from the solo cello, which immediately leads to the next variation.
7. Var. VI: Andante
  The sixth variation develops an accompanimental line out of the solo trill of the previous variation, over which a solo flute rendition of the theme is introduced. After a grand "fall" by the solo cello onto a low E, the orchestra takes over gallantly with the main theme. A cadenza follows, ending back in the trills from the beginning and, once again, the melody is taken over by the solo flute. The variation concludes with the original conjunction, but this time the cello plays it an octave lower, leading into the warm yet foreign key of C major.
8. Var. VII: Andante sostenuto
  The seventh variation lands comfortably on the key of C major and is played at a more contemplative speed. Towards the end of the variation, the key begins to shift towards E major (the dominant of A major) using a fractured version of the conjunction figure. Eventually the variation lands on the meditative unison of a harmonic E, somewhat question-like in the context of the piece yet satisfying in its finality with regards to this particular variation. The E nonetheless provides a strong affirmation of the inevitability of the last variation's arrival in the key of A major.
9. Var. VIII e Coda: Allegro moderato con anima
  The eighth and final variation opens with a graceful solo by the cello, largely based on the Classical idea of a mordent. The opening solo can be seen as one drawn-out crescendo, which eventually reaches fortissimo before swiftly returning to piano and being joined by a light orchestral accompaniment. Shortly after the orchestra joins in, the cello introduces a new idea: a playful mixture of scales and the mordent theme - somewhat reminiscent of the second variation. After several sequences of this new idea, the cello fluidly transitions into the coda. The coda greatly contrasts the character of the variation itself, embodying a greater sense of drama as Tchaikovsky reintroduces the theme and alludes to several of the variations. Eventually the orchestra and soloist end gloriously in A major, concluding the work.

The piece was written between December 1876 and March 1877, immediately following his tone poem Francesca da Rimini, and compared to the vehemence and intensity of Francesca, the Variations show a new elegant classical detachment. While the theme upon which the composition is based is Tchaikovsky's own, the graceful contours that make up the first half of this theme show clearly which style period Tchaikovsky had in mind.

Tchaikovsky had rarely been attracted to the variation form before, except for an eloquent piece for piano solo in F major, Op. 19, No. 6. The utility of this form became apparent for what he now set out to accomplish. In a traditional concerto format, structural complexities and dramatic issues that would have clashed with the 18th-century detachment and finesse could not have been avoided. A neater and easier solution was, in each variation, to retain the melodic outlines and harmonic support outlined in his initial theme.

The potential problem with this approach could be a lack of variety between variations. This would effectively kill the piece. Thanks to his consummate craftsmanship, Tchaikovsky avoided this trap. There is barely a phrase within each variation whose relationship with its progenitor is not explicit. However, no two variations assemble their constituent phrases in the same manner, nor build to the same proportions.

One device that helps Tchaikovsky greatly in this regard is a codetta attached to the end of the theme, to which is attached in turn a quasi-cadential or linking extension. Tchaikovsky varied this extension in length and direction, further modifying the proportions of individual variations and providing a bridge passage from one variation to the next. He even mixed the codetta material with the theme itself in the Andante grazioso variation (No. 4 in Fitzenhagen's arrangement, No. 5 in Tchaikovsky's original order).

== Tchaikovsky versus Fitzenhagen ==
Although the tasteful invention and refined craftsmanship that Tchaikovsky admired in Classical-era music are evident throughout, Fitzenhagen changed the order of the variations, altering Tchaikovsky's intended structure. Tchaikovsky scholar Dr. David Brown points out that, in the composer's original order, the first five variations show "a progressive expansion and evolution of the theme's structure ... the sixth briefly recalling the original phrases of the theme before the seventh, C major variation, new in meter and key," reveals "a vast melodic sweep," providing "the real peak of the piece," after which the final variation (the one Fitzenhagen eventually jettisoned) would guide listeners back toward the point where the piece had started.

As music critic Michael Steinberg points out, "Fitzenhagen intervened considerably in shaping what he considered 'his' piece." Much of the detail in the solo part is his and was actually written by him into Tchaikovsky's autograph. "More importantly," Steinberg adds, "he dropped one entire variation and reshuffled the order of the others. This, in turn, necessitated further cuts and splices."

Order of Variations
Tchaikovsky	Fitzenhagen
Introduction—Theme	Same
Variation I	Same
Variation II	Same but with ending of Var. VI
Variation III	Variation VII
Variation IV	Variation V
Variation V	Variation VI with ending of Var. II
Variation VI	Variation III
Variation VII	Variation IV
Variation VIII	cut
Coda	Same

Tchaikovsky had in fact asked Fitzenhagen to go through the Variations—something about which the composer apparently neglected to inform his publisher, P. I. Jurgenson. In the autograph score the majority of the solo part is actually in Fitzenhagen's hand and the cellist apparently exercised the role of reviser vigorously enough to lead Jurgenson to protest to Tchaikovsky, "Horrible Fitzenhagen insists on changing your cello piece. He wants to 'cello' it up and claims you gave him permission. Good God! Tchaïkovski revu et corrigé par Fitzenhagen!"

Fitzenhagen was proud of the success he had in performing the work, and in a report he wrote Tchaikovsky after playing it at the Wiesbaden Festival in June 1879, he gave a clue as to why he rearranged the order of variations as he did. "I produced a furore with your variations. I pleased so greatly that I was recalled three times, and after the Andante variation (D minor) there was stormy applause. Liszt said to me: 'You carried me away! You played splendidly," and regarding your piece he observed: 'Now there, at last, is real music!'"

The D minor variation Fitzenhagen mentions is actually the third in Tchaikovsky's original sequence. Fitzenhagen may have thought it more effective later in the piece because of its ability to draw applause. He exchanged it with Tchaikovsky's slow penultimate variation, the one in 3/4 time in C major. The Allegro vivace variation which now followed the D minor contrasted very effectively. However, the eighth and final variation was extremely similar to the Allegro vivace. Fitzenhagen did not hesitate to jettison this variation and then tack the final 32 bars of the piece onto the Allegro vivace.

Nevertheless, in one of his occasional fits of insecurity about his work, especially when it came to form, Tchaikovsky allowed the changes to stand. One of Fitzenhagen's students, Anatoliy Brandukov, described an incident eleven years later:

“On one of my visits to Pyotr Ilyich [in 1889] I found him very upset, looking as though he was ill. When I asked: "What's the matter with you?" — Pyotr Ilyich, pointing to the writing desk, said: 'Fitzenhagen's been here. Look what he's done with my composition — everything's been changed!' When I asked what action he was going to take concerning this composition, Pyotr Ilyich replied: 'The Devil take it! Let it stand as it is!'"

The Variations were played in Fitzenhagen's order until the Russian cellist Victor Kubatsky started researching the piece for himself. By subjecting the manuscript to X-ray experiments, he discovered that Tchaikovsky's text had been inked over. As a result of this discovery, the original version was finally published and has since been recorded. Nevertheless, most cellists still use the Fitzenhagen version of the piece. A large part of the problem was that, while the Russian complete edition of Tchaikovsky's complete works included the original version of the Variations, the State Publishing House issued neither the orchestral parts nor a piano reduction for study purposes.

Cellists who have recorded Tchaikovsky's original version have included Sviatoslav Knushevitsky, Alexander Rudin, Miklós Perényi, Steven Isserlis, Raphael Wallfisch, Johannes Moser, Julian Lloyd Webber, Pieter Wispelwey, Jiří Bárta and Gabriel Schwabe. .

== Adaptations ==
In 2000, trumpeter Sergei Nakariakov played a version of Variations on a Rococo Theme in a transcription for the flugelhorn.

In 2009, Catalin Rotaru played the Variations on a Rococo Theme in a transcription for the double bass for a radio orchestra in Bucharest, Romania.

In 2010, Maxim Rysanov played the Variations on a Rococo Theme in his transcription for viola in a London Promenade Concert.

== Bibliography ==
- Brown, David, Tchaikovsky: The Crisis Years, 1874–1878, (New York: W.W. Norton & Co., 1983). ISBN 0-393-01707-9.
- Campbell, Margaret, The Great Cellists (North Pomfret, Vermont: Trafalgar Square Publishing, 1988). ISBN 0-943955-09-2.
- Steinberg, Michael, The Concerto (Oxford: Oxford University Press, 1998). ISBN 0-19-510330-0.
