= String Quartet (Fitzenhagen) =

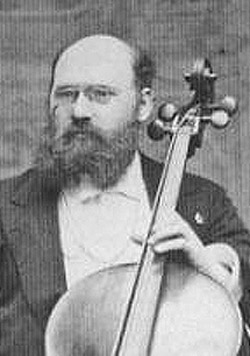
Wilhelm Fitzenhagen

Wilhelm Fitzenhagen's String Quartet in D minor, Op. 23, is the composer's only work for the medium. It was published in 1879 by Breitkopf & Härtel.

== Structure ==
The work is structured in four movements:

1. Adagio – Allegro moderato
2. Andante
3. Allegro
4. Finale: Larghetto – Allegro energico

To date the quartet, which won a prize offered by the St Petersberg Chamber Musical Union, has not been recorded commercially.
