= Wilhelm Fitzenhagen =

German cellist, composer and teacher (1848–1890)

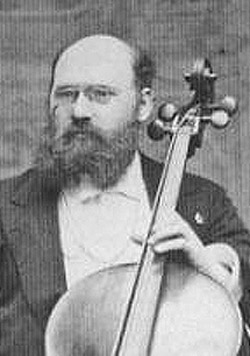
Wilhelm Fitzenhagen.

Karl Friedrich Wilhelm Fitzenhagen (15 September 1848 – 14 February 1890) was a German cellist, composer and teacher, best known today as the dedicatee of Pyotr Ilyich Tchaikovsky's Variations on a Rococo Theme.

== Life ==
Fitzenhagen was born in Seesen in the Duchy of Brunswick, where his father served as music director. Beginning at age five, he received lessons on the piano, the cello and the violin. Many times, he had to substitute for wind players absent due to various emergencies. At age 14, Fitzenhagen began advanced studies of the cello with Theodore Müller. Three years later, Fitzenhagen played for the Duke of Brunswick, who released him from all military service. In 1867, some noble patrons enabled him to study for a year with Friedrich Grützmacher in Dresden, A year later he was appointed to the Dresden Hofkapelle, where he started his career as soloist.

Fitzenhagen's playing at the 1870 Beethoven Festival in Weimar attracted the attention of Franz Liszt, who had formerly served as music director there. Liszt attempted to talk Fitzenhagen into joining the court orchestra. Fitzenhagen, however, had already accepted a professorship at the Moscow Conservatory. Fitzenhagen became regarded as the premier cello instructor in Russia and equally well known as a soloist and chamber music performer. He was appointed solo cellist to the Russian Musical Society and director of the Moscow Music and Orchestral Union. It was through this union that he made many concert appearances as a soloist. He formed a friendship with Tchaikovsky, giving the first performances of all three of that composer's string quartets as well as the Piano Trio as a member of the Russian Music Society's quartet.

Fitzenhagen trained a number of excellent cellists, including Joseph Adamowski, who went to America in 1889 to join the newly formed Boston Symphony Orchestra and helped found the orchestra's pension program. Adamowski also formed a string quartet named after him and taught at the New England Conservatory in Boston.

Fitzenhagen died in Moscow.

== Fitzenhagen and the Rococo Variations ==
Fitzenhagen gave the first performance of Tchaikovsky's Variations on a Rococo Theme, which was dedicated to him, on 30 November 1877. The composer had already allowed his soloist a great deal of freedom in modifying the solo part, but Fitzenhagen chose additionally to alter the sequence of variations, possibly for the opportunity of soloistic display. The D minor variation which had been third in Tchaikovsky's original order was switched with the seventh and an eighth variation dropped altogether. Fitzenhagen may have felt justified by these efforts by the audience reaction after a performance at the Wiesbaden Festival in June 1879, writing to Tchaikovsky, "I produced a furore with your variations. I pleased so greatly that I was recalled three times, and after the Andante variation (D minor) there was stormy applause. [Composer Franz] Liszt said to me, 'You carried me away! You played splendidly', and regarding your piece he observed: 'Now there, at least, is real music'."

How seriously Tchaikovsky may have viewed Fitzenhagen's more radical alterations is difficult to say. After the cello and piano arrangement appeared in Fitzenhagen's ordering of variations in 1878, Tchaikovsky complained to his publisher P. Jurgenson that Fitzenhagen had proofread the piece badly. Later, however, he may have come to regret Fitzenhagen's license with the piece more negatively. When cellist Anatoliy Brandukov approached Tchaikovsky just before the full score was published in 1889, he found the composer "very upset, looking as though he was ill. When I asked: 'What's the matter with you?' Pyotr Ilyich, pointing to the writing table, said: 'That idiot Fitzenhagen's been here. Look what he's done to my piece — he's altered everything!' When I asked what action he was going to take concerning this composition, Pyotr Ilyich replied: 'The devil take it! Let it stand as it is!'"

Fitzenhagen's 1878 order was retained and the work became part of the standard repertoire. The variations are still played in Fitzenhagen's sequence to the present day, despite the subsequent discovery and restoration of the composer's original order.

== Selected compositions ==
Fitzenhagen wrote more than 60 works for the cello. These include four concertos, a suite for cello and orchestra, a string quartet and numerous salon pieces. He won an award from the St. Petersburg Chamber Musical Union for his string quartet. However, few of these works have survived.

- Op. 1 – Romance
- Op. 2 – Concerto for Cello and Orchestra No. 1, in B minor
- Op. 3 – Two Songs Without Words for Cello and Piano
- Op. 4 – Concerto Fantastique, for Cello and Orchestra No. 2, in A minor
- Op. 5 – Tarantella
- Op. 6 – Nocturne, for Piano and Harp
- Op. 7 – Wiegenlied, for 4 cellos
- Op. 8 – Resignation, Sacred Song Without Words, for Cello and Organ or Piano, in E-flat major. Also for 4 cellos, in F major.
- Op. 10 – Ballad, for Cello and Orchestra or Piano
- Op. 13 – Impromptu
- Op. 14 – Concert Mazurka
- Op. 15 – Consolation, for Cello and Organ or Piano
- Op. 16 – Three Easy Pieces, for Cello
- Op. 20 – Two Morceaux de Salon, for Cello
- Op. 21 – Elegy
- Op. 22 – Three Small Pieces for a Young Cellist
- Op. 23 – String Quartet in D minor
- Op. 24 – Perpetual Motion Machine for Cello and Piano
- Op. 25 – Light Variations in G major on an Original Theme for Cello and Orchestra

Arrangement 1: for piano, Breitkopf (Edition Breitkopf No. 3280)
Arrangement 2: for piano, edited by G. Bostrem (Г. Бострема)

- Op. 26 – Album Leaf
- Op. 27 – Three Morceaux de Salon, for Cello
- Op. 28 – 40 Exercises & Technical Studies for the Cello
- Op. 29 – Three Easy Pieces in the First Position
- Op. 31 – Concert Waltzes for Four Cellos
- Op. 32 – Funeral March
- Op. 33 – Variations on a Rococo Theme for Cello and Orchestra, by Tchaikovsky; heavily edited by Fitzenhagen
- Op. 34 – Fantasy on Motifs from the Opera "The Demon" by Anton Rubinstein
- Op. 35 – Serenade, for Solo Cello, in G major
- Op. 36 – Gavotte, in A major
- Op. 40 – Capriccio
- Op. 41 – Ave Maria for Four Cellos
- Op. 42 – Gavotte No. 2 for Cello and Piano
- Op. 43 – Impromptu
- Op. 44 – Nocturne
- Op. 45 – Minuet
- Op. 59 – The Spinnerin for Four Cellos
- Op. 62 – Suite for Cello, Orchestra, and Piano
- Op. 63 – Concerto for Cello and Orchestra No. 3, in A minor

== Discography ==
- Wilhelm Fitzenhagen: Cello Concerto No. 2; Various pieces for cello and piano. Performed by Jens Peter Maintz, Paul Rivinius, Münchner Rundfunkorchester, and Peter Rundel (Oehms Classics, 2007, OC 702)
- Wilhelm Fitzenhagen. Cello concertos Nos. 1 & 2. Includes also Ballade Op. 10, Resignation Op. 8 and Tchaikovsky's Variations on a Rococo Theme. Performed by Alban Gerhardt, Deutsches Symphonie-Orchester Berlin, and Stefan Blunier (Hyperion Records, 2015, CDA68063 — The Romantic Cello Concerto, Vol. 7)

== Bibliography ==
- Brown, David, Tchaikovsky: The Crisis Years, 1874-1878 (New York and London: W.W. Norton & Company, 1983),ISBN 0-393-01707-9.
- Brown, David, Tchaikovsky: The Final Years, 1885-1893, (New York: W.W. Norton & Company, 1991), ISBN 0-393-03099-7.
- Campbell, Margaret, The Great Cellists (North Pomfret, Vermont: Trafalgar Square Publishing, 1988), ISBN 0-943955-09-2.
- MacGregor, Lynda, ed. Stanley Sadie, "Fitzenhagen, (Karl Friedrich) Wilhelm", in The New Grove Dictionary of Music and Musicians, Second Edition, 29 vols (London: Macmillan, 2001), ISBN 1-56159-239-0.
